= List of AirBorneo destinations =

AirBorneo, the flag carrier of Sarawak, following is a list of destinations AirBorneo flies to as part of its scheduled services, as of August 2026.

AirBorneo flies to 1 international and 22 domestic destinations in 2 countries across Southeast Asia. This list excludes destinations formed as a result of codeshare agreements.

== History ==
In 20 July 2026, AirBorneo began flying from Kuching to Kuala Lumpur, services to Singapore followed in two days with two wet-leased Boeing 737-800s from Batik Air Malaysia.

Due to the need to continue operating the Malaysian federal transport ministry-subsidised rural air services (RAS) network, much of AirBorneo's network was inherited from its predecessor MASwings.

== List ==
| Country | City | Airport | Notes | Refs |
|---|---|---|---|---|
| Malaysia (Federal Territory of Labuan) | Victoria | Labuan Airport | | |
| Malaysia (Peninsular Malaysia) | Kuala Lumpur | Kuala Lumpur International Airport | | |
| Malaysia (Sabah) | Kota Kinabalu | Kota Kinabalu International Airport | Focus city | |
| Malaysia (Sabah) | Lahad Datu | Lahad Datu Airport | | |
| Malaysia (Sabah) | Sandakan | Sandakan Airport | | |
| Malaysia (Sabah) | Tawau | Tawau Airport | Focus city | |
| Malaysia (Sarawak) | Ba'kelalan | Ba'kelalan Airport | | |
| Malaysia (Sarawak) | Bario | Bario Airport | | |
| Malaysia (Sarawak) | Bintulu | Bintulu Airport | | |
| Malaysia (Sarawak) | Kuching | Kuching International Airport | Hub | |
| Malaysia (Sarawak) | Lawas | Lawas Airport | | |
| Malaysia (Sarawak) | Limbang | Limbang Airport | | |
| Malaysia (Sarawak) | Long Akah | Long Akah Airport | | |
| Malaysia (Sarawak) | Long Banga | Long Banga Airport | | |
| Malaysia (Sarawak) | Long Lellang | Long Lellang Airport | | |
| Malaysia (Sarawak) | Long Seridan | Long Seridan Airport | | |
| Malaysia (Sarawak) | Marudi | Marudi Airport | | |
| Malaysia (Sarawak) | Miri | Miri Airport | Focus city | |
| Malaysia (Sarawak) | Mukah | Mukah Airport | | |
| Malaysia (Sarawak) | Gunung Mulu National Park | Mulu Airport | | |
| Malaysia (Sarawak) | Sibu | Sibu Airport | | |
| Malaysia (Sarawak) | Tanjung Manis/Sarikei | Tanjung Manis Airport | | |
| Singapore | Singapore | Changi Airport | | |

== See also ==
- Transport in Malaysia
