= AirBorneo =

Airline of Malaysia

AirBorneo Airways Sdn Bhd
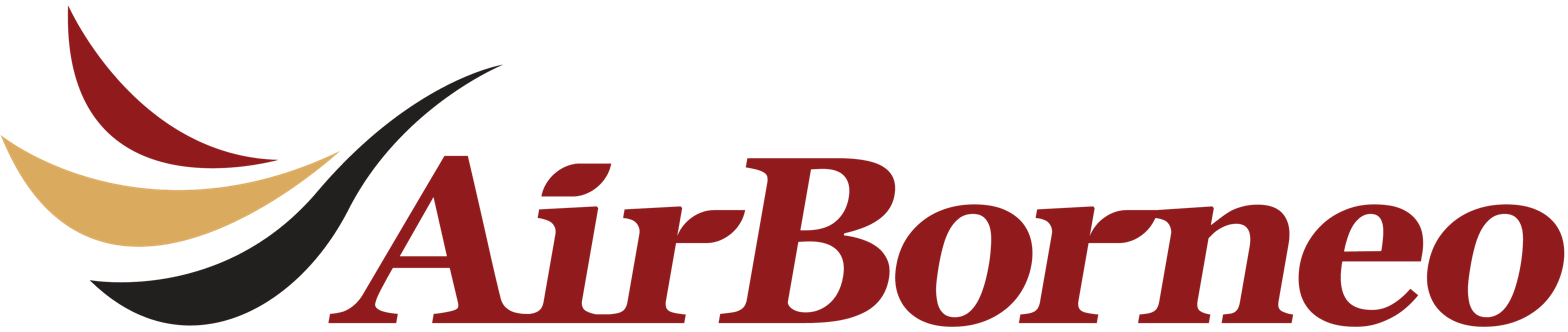

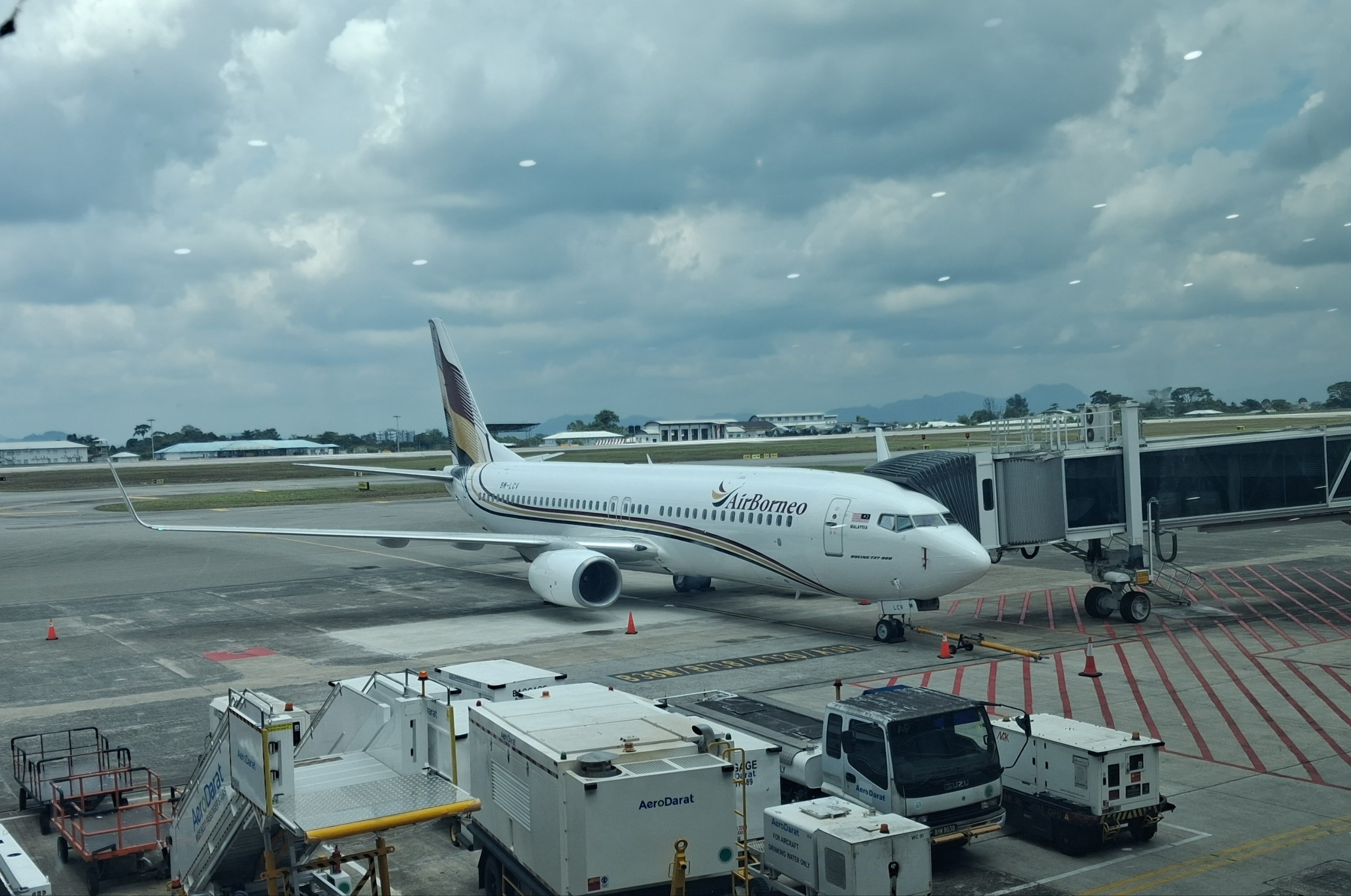
- An AirBorneo Boeing 737-800 at Kuching International Airport
IATA	ICAO	Call sign
MY	MWG	MASWINGS
- Founded: 17 May 2007; 19 years ago (as MASwings)
- Commenced operations: 1 October 2007; 19 years ago (as MASwings); 1 January 2026; 10 months ago (as AirBorneo)
- Hubs: Kuching
- Secondary hubs: Miri
- Fleet size: 14
- Destinations: 24
- Parent company: Sarawak Government
- Headquarters: Kuching, Sarawak, Malaysia
- Key people: Datuk Amar Mohamad Abu Bakar Marzuki (chairman); Megat Ardian Wira Mohd Aminuddin (CEO)
- Website: www.airborneo.com/en

AirBorneo is a state-owned airline based in Sarawak, Malaysia. It was established following the Sarawak government's acquisition of MASwings in January 2025 and commenced operations on 2 January 2026.

The airline operates Rural Air Services (RAS) to remote communities across East Malaysia under a Public Service Obligation (PSO) framework, continuing services previously provided by MASwings. Following the acquisition, AirBorneo is managed by the Sarawak government and relocated its headquarters from Kota Kinabalu, Sabah to Kuching, Sarawak. To ensure continuity of operations, the airline retained MASwings' existing workforce and fleet, while the Federal Government continues to subsidise RAS services in both Sarawak and Sabah.

In addition to operating Rural Air Services, AirBorneo also operates scheduled domestic and international passenger services. In July 2026, the airline expanded into jet operations with the introduction of commercial flights from Kuching to destinations including Kuala Lumpur and Singapore.

== History ==
=== Rural Air Services in Malaysian Borneo ===
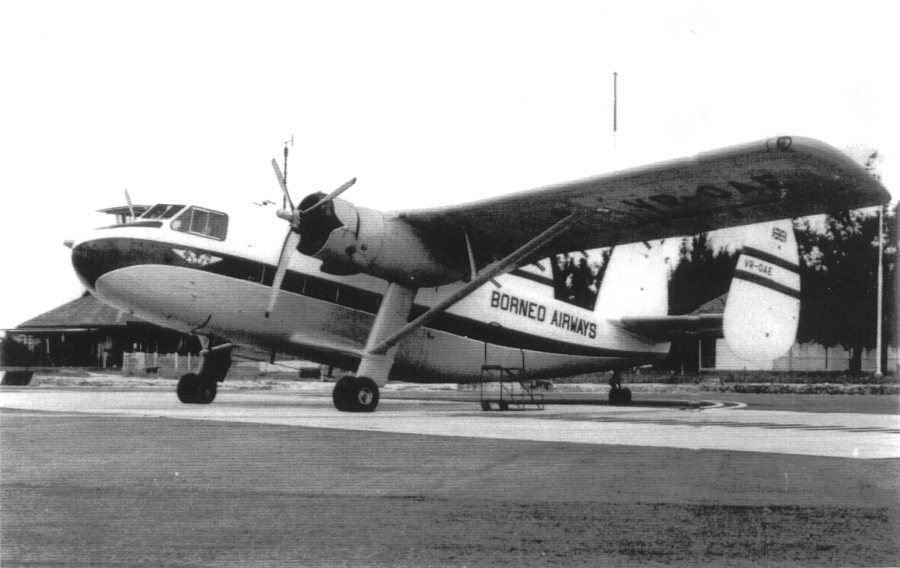
A Scottish Aviation Twin Pioneer aircraft operated by Borneo Airways

The history of Rural Air Services (RAS) in Malaysian Borneo dates back to 1953, when Sabah Airways became the first regional airline to provide air connectivity between remote areas of British Borneo. In 1955, the airline was renamed Borneo Airways, which continued to serve rural communities through its "Ulu Air Service" also known as "Rural and Inter-colony flights". The service was critical in connecting isolated regions of North Borneo (now known as Sabah) and Sarawak with more developed urban centers.

In 1965, Borneo Airways merged with its parent company, Malaysian Airways, which later evolved into Malaysia–Singapore Airlines and eventually Malaysia Airline System. This merger facilitated the continuation and expansion of rural air services in Sabah and Sarawak, ensuring essential transportation links for remote communities and maintaining connectivity across East Malaysia's less accessible regions.

By the early 2000s, Malaysia Airlines was experiencing significant financial difficulties, partly due to the operational costs of maintaining RAS routes. The airline reported financial losses from these services, which were not economically viable due to low passenger volumes on many routes. More than 40 routes were deemed unprofitable, leading to a reliance on government subsidies. Prior to 2006, RAS operations were not subsidised, further complicating the airline's ability to maintain these routes.

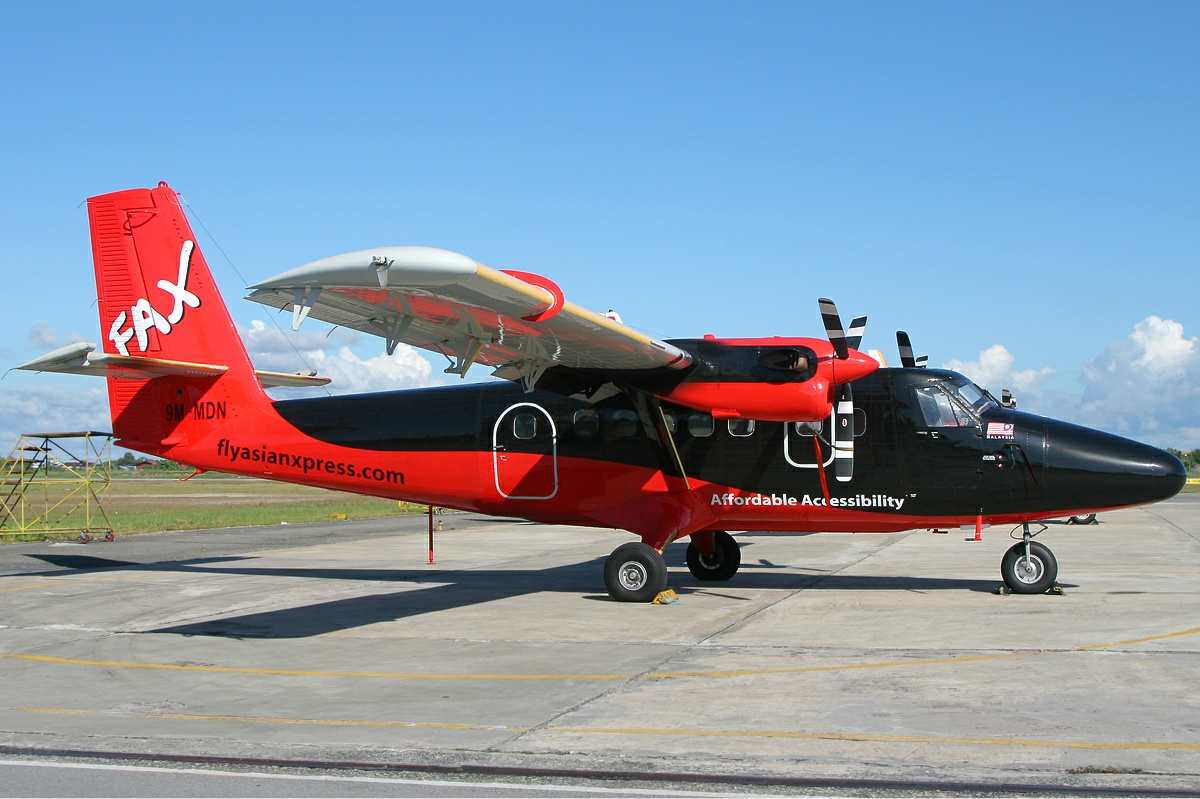
FlyAsianXpress (FAX) Twin Otter in 2007

In August 2006, the Malaysian government outsourced the operation of Rural Air Service to FlyAsianXpress (FAX), a subsidiary of AirAsia, aiming to enhance efficiency, reduce costs and improve connectivity for rural communities. Initially, FAX attracted attention with competitive fares and promotional offers, but the airline soon faced operational difficulties. Challenges such as maintenance issues and unreliable service led to frequent flight cancellations and passenger dissatisfaction.

To resolve these issues, Tony Fernandes, CEO of AirAsia, proposed on 11 April 2007 that the RAS routes operated by FAX be transferred to Firefly, a subsidiary of Malaysia Airlines, which had more experience managing turboprop operations. Following this recommendation, the Malaysian government announced on 26 April 2007 that Malaysia Airlines would resume control of the rural routes.

=== MASwings ===
==== 2007–2012: Establishment and early years ====
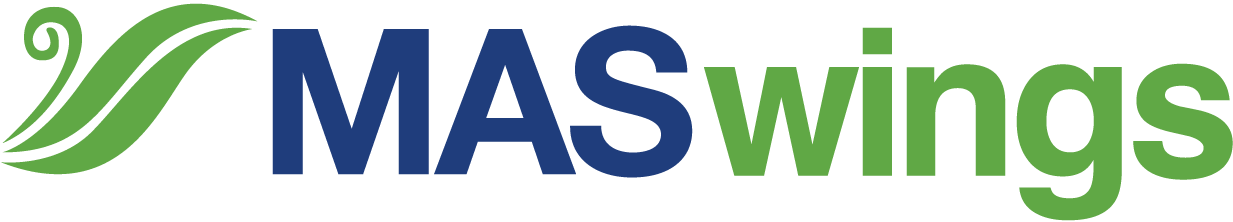
The MASwings logo from 2007 to its rebranding in 2026

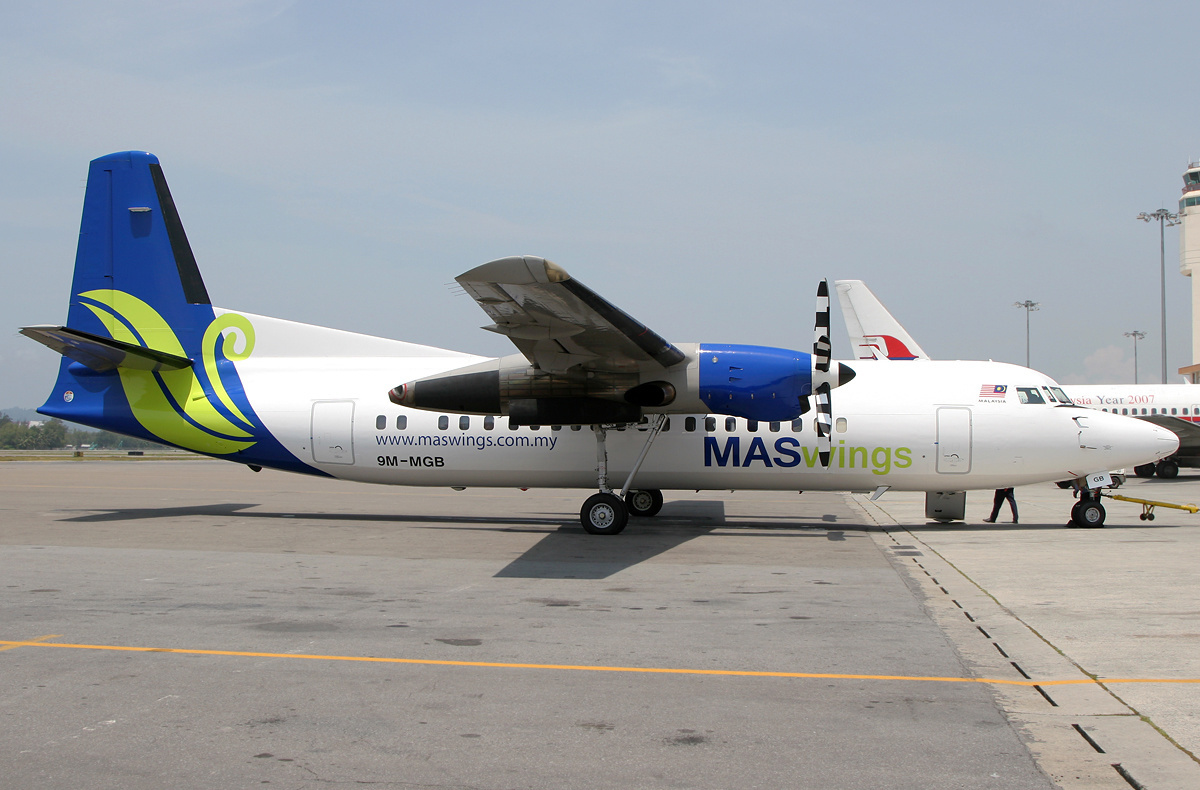
MASwings retired their Fokker 50 aircraft in 2010, their routes being replaced by ATR 72 aircraft.

MASwings was established on 17 May 2007 as a regional subsidiary of Malaysia Airlines (MAS). Its inaugural flight coincided with the anniversary of Malaysia Airlines founding in 1972. The creation of MASwings was part of Malaysia Airlines strategy to restore and expand air services in East Malaysia, following operational challenges faced by its predecessor, FlyAsianXpress.

MASwings was created to address these gaps in service and provide affordable and reliable air transport to rural areas in East Malaysia. The airline's mission was to enhance connectivity for isolated communities, which often had limited access to road transportation due to difficult terrain.

The airline began operations in 1 October 2007 with a fleet of Fokker 50 and DHC-6 Twin Otter aircraft. These smaller planes were ideal for short-haul flights to regional airports with limited infrastructure. By the end of 2007, MASwings operated 450 weekly flights to 22 destinations across East Malaysia, including smaller towns and rural regions, marking the beginning of its service in improving connectivity in the region.

By 2009, MASwings began to broaden its operations, increasing flight frequency and expanding its route network. In December 2009, the airline announced plans to expand internationally, with destinations in the Philippines and Indonesia as part of its growth strategy. However, regulatory delays meant that MASwings initially focused on international routes within the Brunei–Indonesia–Malaysia–Philippines East ASEAN Growth Area (BIMP-EAGA).

In June 2010, MASwings expanded its international operations further within the BIMP-EAGA framework, which aimed to foster closer regional ties between Southeast Asian nations. This expansion resulted in the introduction of additional international routes, including flights between Kota Kinabalu and Bandar Seri Begawan (Brunei), as well as between Kota Kinabalu and Puerto Princesa (Philippines). Other new routes included services between Kuching and Pontianak (Indonesia), and between Tawau and Tarakan (Indonesia). By 2012, MASwings had officially commenced these services, helping strengthen its presence in the region.

During this period, MASwings also focused on modernising its fleet. The airline transitioned to ATR 72-500 aircraft, which were more fuel-efficient and better suited to the airline's regional operations. These turboprop aircraft, along with the DHC-6 Twin Otter, enabled MASwings to serve short-haul routes efficiently, particularly to smaller airports with limited facilities.

==== 2012–2019: Growth and regional connectivity ====
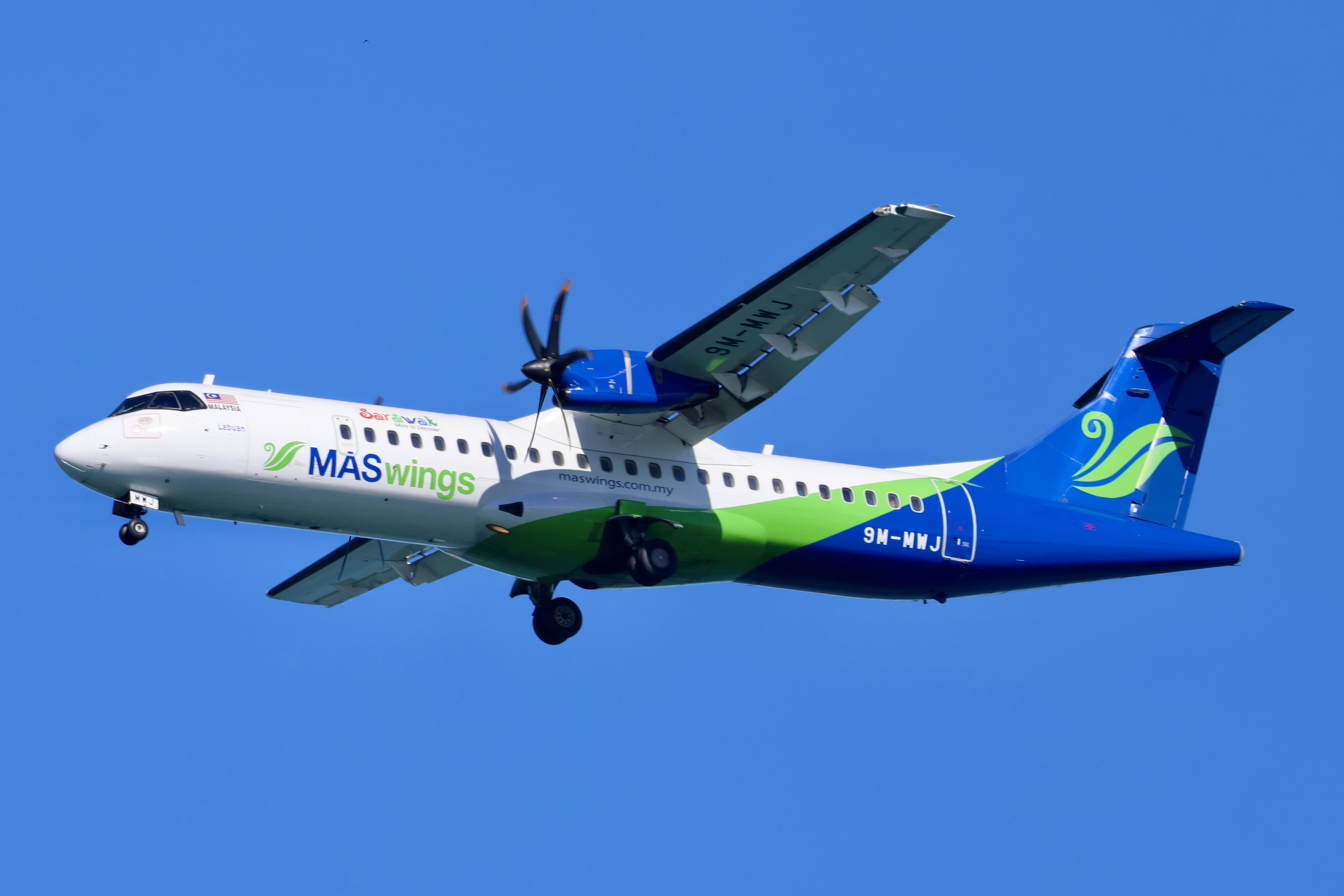
MASwings ATR 72

Between 2012 and 2017, MASwings continued to solidify its position as a key regional carrier in East Malaysia, with an emphasis on providing air services to underserved rural areas. The airline's focus remained on supporting local tourism and connecting remote communities with urban centers, making it an essential part of the region's transport network.

MASwings' fleet of ATR 72-500 aircraft expanded, and the airline gradually increased its flight frequency. The airline continued to play a critical role in the BIMP-EAGA initiative, which fostered regional collaboration by improving connectivity between Brunei, Indonesia, Malaysia and the Philippines.

As part of the second phase of the BIMP-EAGA plan in 2012, the airline considered expanding to three new destinations: Makassar and Balikpapan in Indonesia, and Davao in the Philippines, with flights to Makassar and Davao routed through Tawau. Additional proposed routes included Manado in Indonesia, as well as Cebu and Zamboanga in the Philippines. In 2014, MASwings announced intentions to reposition itself as a low-cost carrier, with four leased jet aircraft to operate routes from Kota Kinabalu to several Chinese cities. However, these proposals were not implemented.

By 2017, MASwings had earned a reputation as a reliable air service provider to some of the most remote parts of Malaysia and its neighboring countries. Despite facing challenges in the international market that led to the closure of most of its international routes, MASwings maintained its core focus on domestic services, particularly in East Malaysia. This period saw the airline continuing to operate to destinations like Kota Kinabalu, Kuching, Miri and Labuan, along with its sole international route to Tarakan, Indonesia.

Between 2018 and 2019, MASwings achieved key milestones that reinforced its role in regional aviation. In 2018, the airline was recognized by the Malaysia Book of Records for its exceptional contributions to rural air services. It received awards for the "Longest Operating Hours for Rural Air Services" and the "Most Number of Passengers Transported via Rural Air Services," highlighting its important role in East Malaysia's economic and social development. These accolades underscored the airline's commitment to connecting remote communities and fostering local growth.

In 2019, MASwings entered into a new Public Service Obligation (PSO) agreement with the Malaysian government to operate Rural Air Services (RAS) across 40 routes in Sabah and Sarawak until 2024. This agreement included an annual subsidy of RM209 million to cover operational costs and maintain connectivity to underserved regions. The airline's fleet, comprising ATR 72-500 and DHC-6 Twin Otter aircraft, was well-suited for these short-haul flights to remote destinations.

==== 2020–2023: Navigating pandemic challenges ====
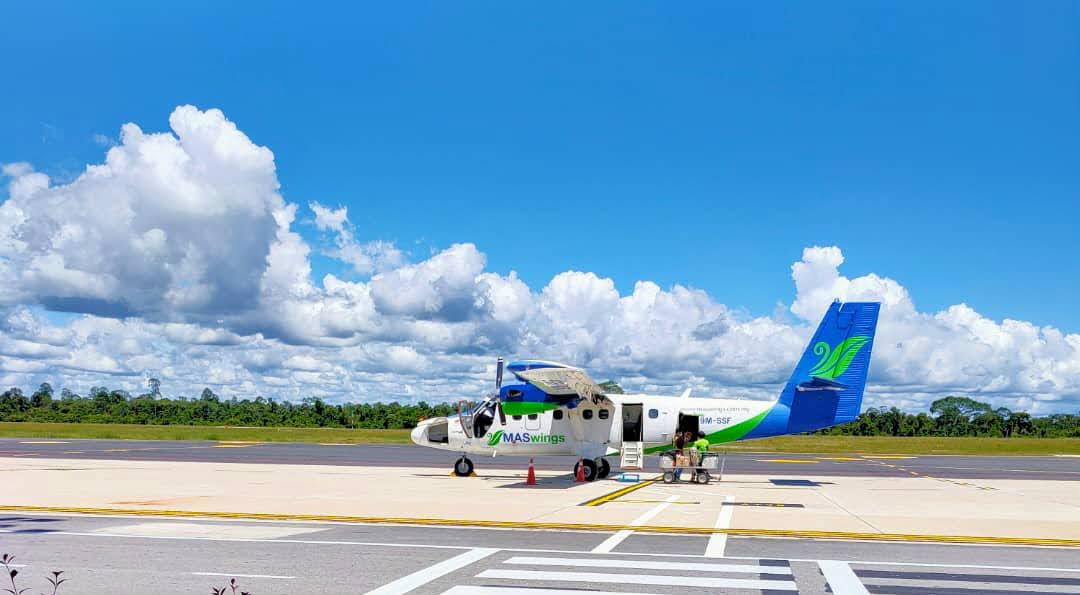
MASwings Twin Otter aircraft at Mukah New Airport, Sarawak. The airline uses this type of aircraft for regional flights within Borneo

The COVID-19 pandemic in 2020 significantly impacted MASwings, as the Movement Control Order (MCO) led to flight suspensions and a sharp decline in passenger numbers. As restrictions eased in 2021, MASwings gradually resumed operations, although recovery was slow due to fluctuating demand and ongoing health concerns. Throughout this period, the airline continued to receive government subsidies.

By 2022, the airline experienced a significant recovery in both passenger traffic and cargo volumes after the challenges of the COVID-19 pandemic. Over the period from 2019 to 2022, MASwings successfully transported approximately 2.4 million passengers and handled more than 2,000 metric tonnes of cargo.

However, in 2022, MASwings permanently discontinued its sole remaining international route, operated using an ATR 72 aircraft, which connected Tawau in Malaysia to Tarakan in Indonesia. The service had been suspended for over two years during the pandemic, and despite market recovery, the airline determined that passenger volumes were insufficient to justify resuming the route. With this decision, MASwings shifted its focus exclusively to domestic operations.

In 2023, MASwings began taking steps to enhance its environmental sustainability. The airline announced plans to adopt sustainable aviation fuel (SAF) derived from microalgae as part of its efforts to reduce its carbon footprint. This initiative was in line with the broader global shift in the aviation industry towards environmentally responsible practices, as airlines worldwide strive to lower their environmental impact. MASwings' adoption of SAF marked a significant step in its commitment to greener aviation practices.

=== AirBorneo ===
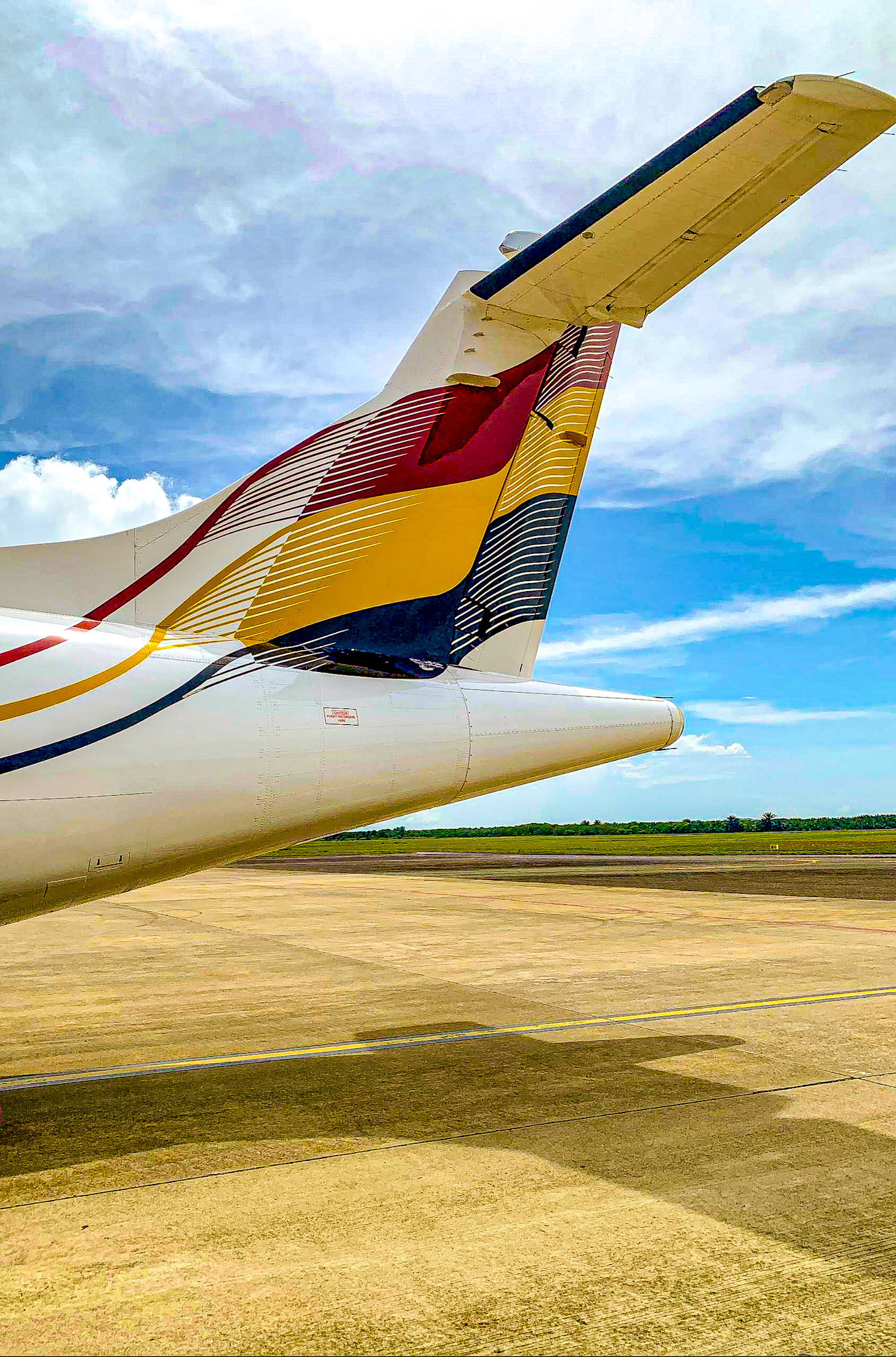
AirBorneo ATR 72-500 displaying its new tail design, following the airline’s rebranding from MASwings in 2026

==== 2023–2025: Interest and formation plans ====
In 2023, the Sarawak government expressed interest in acquiring MASwings from Malaysia Airlines as part of a broader regional strategy to establish a state-owned boutique airline. The acquisition aims to enhance Sarawak's connectivity and expand regional routes, supporting the state's efforts to improve air service availability and stimulate local economic growth. Initially expected to be completed by December 2024, the process was delayed to the first quarter of 2025 due to discrepancies in asset valuations between the Sarawak government and Malaysia Aviation Group (MAG), necessitating a third-party assessment.

On 13 January 2025, the Sarawak government officially completed the acquisition of MASwings. The announcement was made by the Premier of Sarawak, Abang Johari Openg, who also revealed that a signing ceremony would take place within the following month in Kuching. While the acquisition price was not disclosed, the process marked a significant step toward Sarawak establishing its own state-owned airline.

==== 2025: Transition to AirBorneo ====
On 12 February 2025, the Sarawak government formally launched AirBorneo following the successful acquisition of MASwings from Malaysia Aviation Group (MAG). The signing of the Sale and Purchase Agreement in Kuching marked the official transfer of ownership, enabling Sarawak to establish its own state-owned airline. The formation of AirBorneo aligns with the state's long-term objective of enhancing air connectivity, supporting economic development and positioning Sarawak as an aviation hub within Borneo.

Following its launch, the Sarawak government offered Sabah the option to collaborate or take an equity stake in AirBorneo. Preliminary discussions took place through Sabah Air Aviation Sdn Bhd, but any participation would require state approval. Observers in Sabah noted that the state already maintained comparatively stronger air connectivity than Sarawak, particularly through Kota Kinabalu International Airport, which handles a higher volume of domestic and international flights. In August 2025, Datuk John Lo suggested that Sabah focus on attracting additional airline services rather than investing in AirBorneo. This perspective was reiterated by State Finance Minister Datuk Seri Masidi Manjun the following month, who stated that Sabah was not in a position to establish or invest in a commercial airline, citing cost, technological and fiscal considerations, and emphasised that state priorities remained on infrastructure, public services, and the ongoing role of Sabah Air Aviation.

With its ownership and operational structure confirmed, AirBorneo consolidated its management and administrative functions by relocating its headquarters from Kota Kinabalu to Kuching. Premier Abang Johari Openg stated that the establishment of AirBorneo would contribute to tourism growth, investment opportunities and employment creation within the state. In preparation for operations, AirBorneo conducted system testing and dry runs to ensure its digital and operational systems were ready. Its official website was launched on 10 December 2025, offering tickets for travel from 14 January 2026.

As part of the transition, all existing MASwings staff were absorbed into AirBorneo to ensure continuity of operations, with Sarawakian applicants given priority for technical and operational positions for future vacancies. In addition, the airline's establishment was also intended to support the development of the state's aerospace industry through specialised training and certification in areas such as aircraft maintenance, mechanical engineering and pilot simulator operations. By the time MASwings was rebranded as AirBorneo, it had completed over 430,000 flights and carried more than 19 million passengers across its network.

==== 2026–present: Inaugural operations and initial development ====
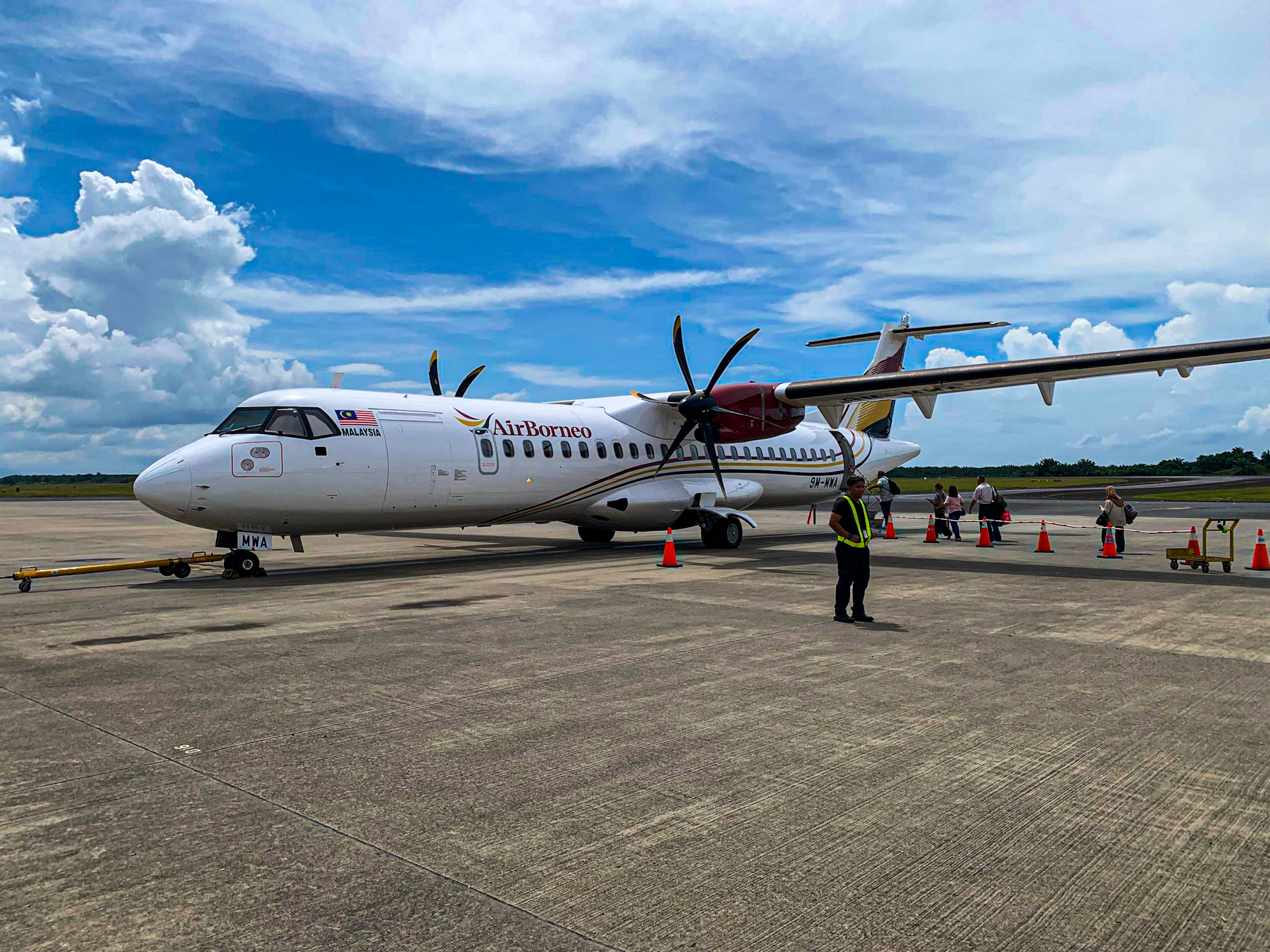
AirBorneo ATR 72-500 in Tawau Airport

AirBorneo commenced operations on 2 January 2026 with its inaugural flights departing from Kuching International Airport. Initial services were operated using turboprop aircraft, including the DHC-6-400 and ATR 72-500, following the transfer of the airline from MASwings to the Sarawak government. The inaugural flights operated to Mukah and Tanjung Manis using twin-engine turboprop and Twin Otter aircraft bearing the airline's new livery.

As part of the transition to the AirBorneo brand, new cabin crew uniforms uniforms were introduced, featuring a scarf incorporating design elements inspired by Sarawak's keringkam embroidery, a traditional craft of the Sarawak Malay community. As part of the phased implementation of AirBorneo's brand identity, MASwings' physical branding across airports, aircraft, uniforms and operational equipment is scheduled to be progressively removed over a six-month period.

Plans for the airline's expansion into jet operations progressed in 2026, with services expected to commence in the third quarter of the year using three Boeing 737-800 aircraft. The initial network was planned to include routes from Kuala Lumpur, Singapore, Kota Kinabalu and Jakarta. The aircraft are anticipated to be operated under a wet lease (ACMI) arrangement with Ascend Airways Malaysia, a subsidiary of Avia Solutions Group. The introduction of jet services is intended to support the airline's transition towards regional commercial operations.

On 7 July 2026, AirBorneo began ticket sales for its Kuching–Kuala Lumpur route. The inaugural flight is scheduled to operate on 20 July 2026, with regular twice-daily services between Kuching International Airport and Kuala Lumpur International Airport began on 21 July 2026. Ticket sales for the airline's first international service, between Kuching and Singapore, opened on 13 July, and daily flights commenced on 22 July 2026. The airline also announced plans to introduce domestic services to Miri, Bintulu and Sibu after expanding its fleet, while additional routes between Sarawak and Sabah remained under consideration.

== Destinations ==
AirBorneo assumed responsibility for these routes following its acquisition of MASwings; the list reflects inherited services as of July 2026.

Country	City	Airport	Notes	Notes/refs
Brunei	Bandar Seri Begawan	Brunei International Airport	Terminated	Previously operated by MASwings
Indonesia	Balikpapan	Sultan Aji Muhammad Sulaiman Sepinggan Airport	Terminated	Previously operated by MASwings
Indonesia	Jakarta	Soekarno–Hatta International Airport		
Indonesia	Pontianak	Supadio Airport	Terminated	Previously operated by MASwings
Indonesia	Tarakan	Juwata International Airport	Terminated	Previously operated by MASwings
Malaysia	Ba'kelalan	Ba'kelalan Airport		
Malaysia	Bario	Bario Airport		
Malaysia	Bintulu	Bintulu Airport		
Malaysia	Kota Kinabalu	Kota Kinabalu International Airport		
Malaysia	Kuala Lumpur	Kuala Lumpur International Airport		
Malaysia	Kuching	Kuching International Airport	Main hub	
Malaysia	Kudat	Kudat Airport	Terminated	Previously operated by MASwings
Malaysia	Labuan	Labuan Airport		
Malaysia	Lahad Datu	Lahad Datu Airport		
Malaysia	Lawas	Lawas Airport		
Malaysia	Limbang	Limbang Airport		
Malaysia	Long Akah	Long Akah Airport		
Malaysia	Long Banga	Long Banga Airport		
Malaysia	Long Lellang	Long Lellang Airport		
Malaysia	Long Seridan	Long Seridan Airport		
Malaysia	Marudi	Marudi Airport		
Malaysia	Miri	Miri Airport	Twin-Otter hub	
Malaysia	Mukah	Mukah Airport		
Malaysia	Mulu	Mulu Airport		
Malaysia	Sandakan	Sandakan Airport		
Malaysia	Sarikei	Tanjung Manis Airport		(Note: Although Tanjung Manis is now under the jurisdiction of Mukah Division, the airport still serves the part of the population of Sarikei.)
Malaysia	Sibu	Sibu Airport		
Malaysia	Tawau	Tawau Airport		
Philippines	Puerto Princesa	Puerto Princesa International Airport	Terminated	Previously operated by MASwings
Singapore	Singapore	Changi Airport		

== Fleet ==
=== Current fleet ===
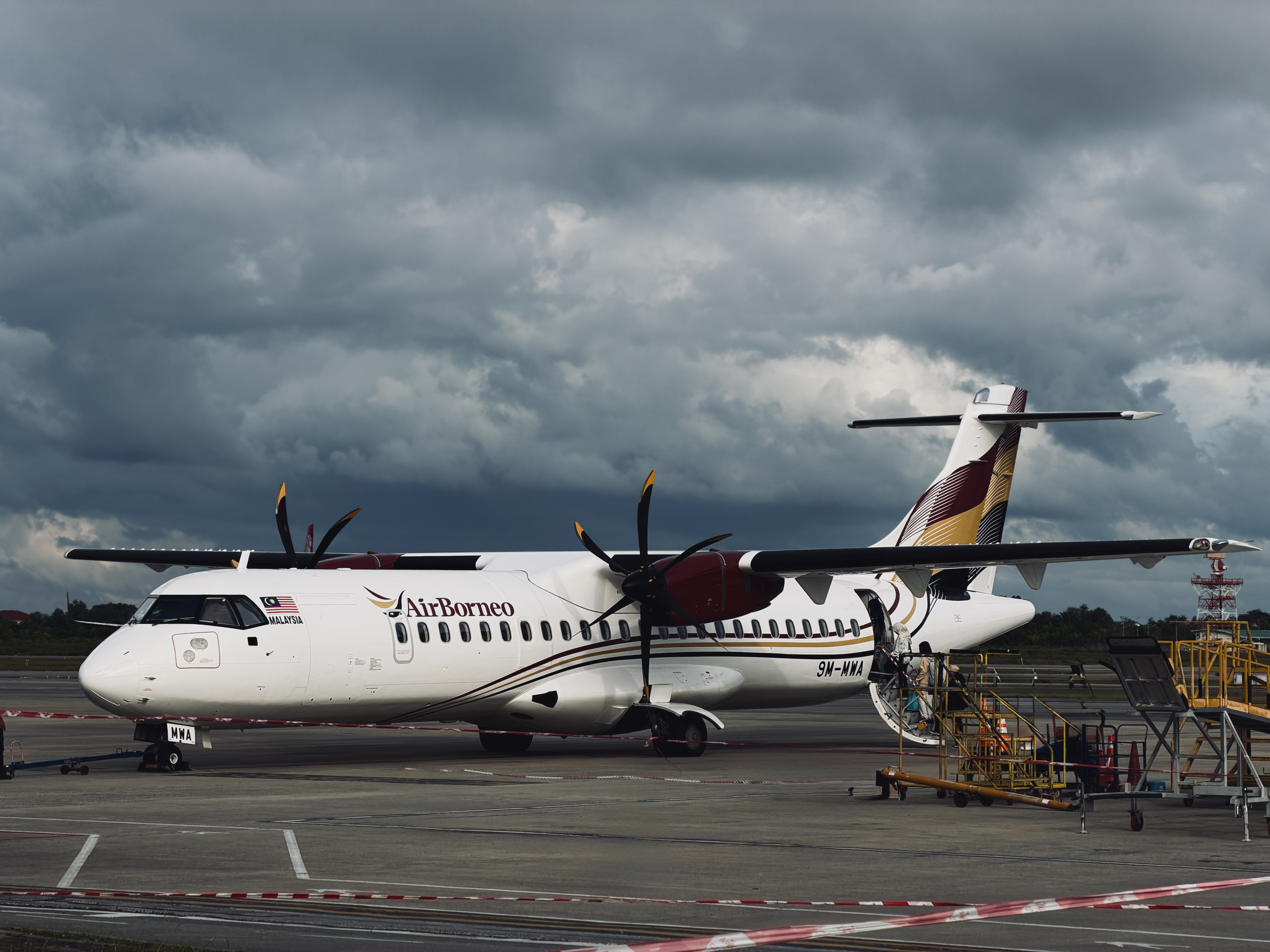
An ATR-72 aircraft in its current livery

As of April 2026, AirBorneo operates the following aircraft, previously part of MASwings fleet:

Fleet
Aircraft	In service	Orders	Passengers	Notes
ATR 42-600	—	3	TBA	Deliveries scheduled to begin in 2027
ATR 72-500	8	—	68	Inherited from MASwings, to be replaced by ATR 72-600 and ATR 42-600 in 2027
ATR 72-600	—	5	TBA	Deliveries scheduled to begin in 2027; 4 additional options
Boeing 737-800	1	4	TBA	Wet leased from Ascend Airways Malaysia and Batik Air Malaysia, first aircraft was delivered July 16, 2026
Viking Air DHC-6-400 Twin Otter	6	—	19	Inherited from MASwings; used for rural air services
Total	14	11		

=== Former fleet ===
AirBorneo and its predecessor MASwings have previously operated the following aircraft:

AirBorneo historical fleet
Aircraft	Total	Passengers	Introduced	Retired	Replacement	Notes
ATR 72-600	4	70	2013	2015	—	To be reintroduced in 2027
De Havilland Canada DHC-6-300 Twin Otter	4	20	2007	2013	Viking Air DHC-6-400 Twin Otter	Leased from FlyAsianXpress.
Fokker 50	8	50	2007	2010	ATR 72-500	

=== Fleet replacement ===
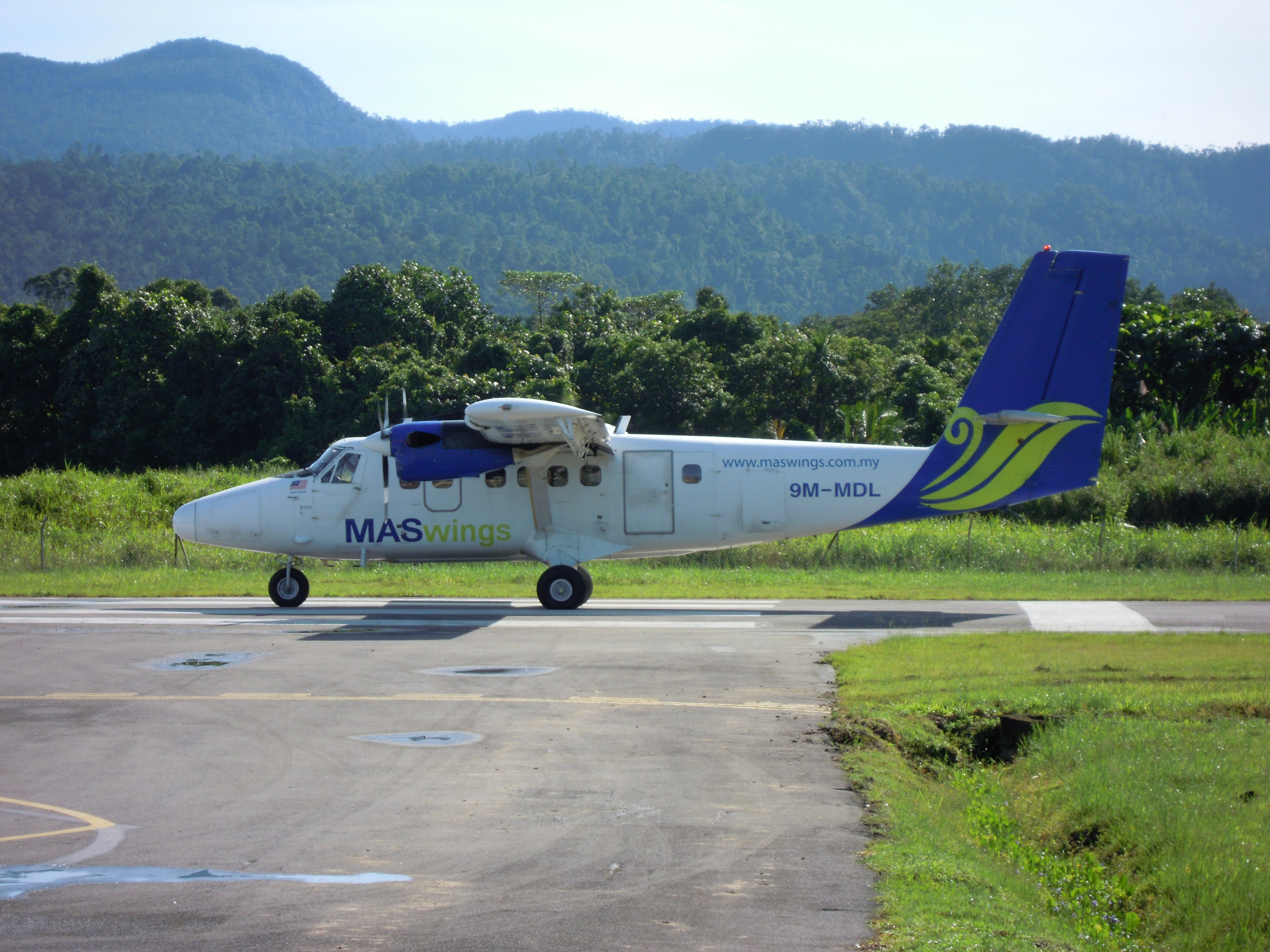
MASwings Twin Otter 9M-MDL at Lawas Airport

On 9 November 2007, MASwings, through its parent Malaysia Airlines, signed a Memorandum of Understanding (MoU) to purchase seven ATR 72-500 aircraft, with options for three more, to expand its services in Sabah and Sarawak. The first ATR 72-500 was delivered in 2008, with the remaining six arriving by 2009 and the optional three by 2010. MASwings retired its last Fokker 50 (9M-MGF) on 25 April 2010.

To modernise its short-haul operations, MASwings announced plans to replace its aging DHC-6 Twin Otters with newer models, including the Dornier 228NG and Viking Air DHC-6 Series 400. By 2013, six brand-new DHC-6 Twin Otter Series 400 aircraft entered service.

In December 2012, Malaysia Airlines ordered 36 ATR 72-600 aircraft, with 16 destined for MASwings. MASwings received its first ATR 72–600 in July 2013 and planned to replace its older ATR 72-500s gradually. However, due to disputes over the RAS (Rural Air Service) contract, some routes were removed in 2015 and the newer ATRs were withdrawn prematurely, with further orders canceled.

ATR later proposed modernising MASwings' ATR 72-500 fleet to the ATR 72-600, contingent on the airline's transfer to the Sarawak state government. With the formation of AirBorneo, the airline plans to replace its aging ATR fleet with new ATR-72 600 aircraft once the current lease period concludes in two years.

In addition, discussions with the Brazilian ambassador to Malaysia explored the potential use of Embraer aircraft for Sarawak's regional and domestic routes. These talks, which drew on similarities in geographical and connectivity challenges between Sarawak and parts of Brazil, were part of broader fleet evaluation considerations, although no decisions or commitments were made.

In February 2026, AirBorneo had announced a firm strategic partnership with ATR to modernize the RAS (Rural Air Service) fleet which includes five new ATR 72-600 aircraft and three new ATR 42-600 aircraft which will be delivered between 2027 and 2029. After Berjaya Air, this will make AirBorneo the second airline in Malaysia to operate the ATR 42 aircraft.

As part of a parallel fleet development strategy, AirBorneo has also advanced plans to introduce jet aircraft for regional commercial operations. In 2026, the airline indicated that it would commence jet services using Boeing 737-800 aircraft operated under a wet lease (ACMI) arrangement with Ascend Airways Malaysia, a subsidiary of Avia Solutions Group.

== Criticism and controversy ==
=== Flight disruptions and operational challenges ===
In June 2026, AirBorneo faced criticism following widespread flight delays and cancellations across Sabah and Sarawak caused by a combination of unscheduled technical rectifications, scheduled aircraft maintenance, and operational constraints. The disruptions, which began on 5 June, affected numerous regional services and left some passengers stranded or forced to seek alternative transportation. Media reports highlighted cases of travellers incurring significant additional expenses and lengthy overland journeys after flights were repeatedly rescheduled or cancelled, while some passengers also reported difficulties contacting the airline's customer service for assistance and refunds.

The disruptions prompted calls for greater transparency and accountability from the airline's management. Sarawak rights activist Peter John Jaban urged AirBorneo chief executive officer Megat Ardian Wira Mohd Aminuddin to publicly explain the causes of the operational issues and outline measures to restore service reliability. Jaban also cited claims from an unnamed aviation industry insider alleging unresolved issues related to the transition of regional operations from MASwings to AirBorneo, including concerns regarding staff welfare, engineering, flight operations, cabin crew management and fleet availability. The disruptions also drew criticism from Betong Division Federation of Chinese Associations president Datuk Dr Ngu Piew Seng, who questioned the airline's operational performance and management response.

In response, Megat Ardian stated that the disruptions were caused by several aircraft becoming unavailable simultaneously due to scheduled maintenance and technical rectification works, and apologised for the delays and cancellations. AirBorneo said that affected aircraft had been withdrawn from service as a precautionary measure until engineers were satisfied that they were safe to operate. Sarawak Minister for Tourism, Creative Industry and Performing Arts, Abdul Karim Rahman Hamzah urged the public not to single out AirBorneo, stating that flight disruptions were also affecting other airlines, including AirAsia. He argued that the airline, which had only recently assumed regional operations following the acquisition of MASwings, should be given time to address operational challenges.

=== Financial transparency and public funding concerns ===
The acquisition and establishment of AirBorneo attracted scrutiny over transparency and financial planning, particularly regarding the disclosure of acquisition costs, fleet strategy, and long-term operational sustainability. From 2023 onwards, commentators and public figures called for clearer information on the airline's business model, projected costs, feasibility and sustainability studies, and the use of public funds, given the capital-intensive nature of airline operations and the need to support unprofitable routes. Similar issues resurfaced in March 2025 following AirBorneo's decision to purchase ATR 72-600 aircraft rather than lease them, with questions raised about cost-effectiveness, consultation, and market feasibility.

In response, government representatives stated that the decisions were based on long-term investment planning and that financial and operational assessments had been conducted. However, as of 2025, some observers continued to highlight the limited public disclosure regarding the extent of funds used for the acquisition and called for greater transparency.

=== Airfare pricing concerns ===
Following the commencement of ticket sales ahead of its full operations, AirBorneo faced public criticism over airfare levels, with some passengers expressing disappointment that fares remained similar to or higher than those previously charged by MASwings. Expectations of lower prices stemmed from earlier statements by the Sarawak government that the airline's success would be measured by its contribution to the state's economy rather than profitability. However, industry observers noted that significant fare reductions would be difficult without continued government subsidies, given the cost-intensive nature of operating rural air services and maintaining turboprop fleets on unprofitable routes. Despite the federal government's ongoing subsidies for rural air services in Sarawak and Sabah, concerns were raised that further fare reductions could affect AirBorneo's financial sustainability. State officials emphasised the need to balance affordability with commercial viability, particularly as the airline plans to expand into jet operations and international routes amid competition from established carriers.

=== Brand identity and public response ===
In August 2025, AirBorneo drew public attention following the unveiling of its "Wings of Unity" logo, after online comparisons were made between the design and existing stock vector images and commercial logos. Opposition figures and participants in the airline's official logo and aircraft livery design competition called for clarification on the selection process, citing the absence of publicly released results. Public reactions to the logo varied, with some members of the public expressing approval, others raised concerns regarding transparency and representativeness in the branding process.

== Awards and recognitions ==
- 2018: The Malaysia Book of Records for "Longest Operating Hours for Rural Air Services"
- 2018: The Malaysia Book of Records for "Most Number of Passengers Transported via Rural Air Services"

== Incidents and accidents ==
- 10 October 2013 — a de Havilland Canada DHC-6 Twin Otter (9M-MDM), operating as MASwings Flight 3002 from Kota Kinabalu to Kudat, landed short of the runway at Kudat Airport. The aircraft impacted a house and was destroyed. This accident marks the only fatal incident for MASwings, where two people were confirmed dead, including the co-pilot.

== See also ==
- List of airlines of Malaysia
- Transport in Malaysia
