= MASwings Flight 3002 =

2013 aviation accident in Malaysia

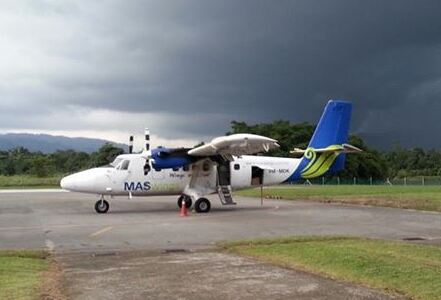
- 9M-MDM, the aircraft involved, seen on the day before the accident

Accident
- Date: 10 October 2013
- Summary: Crashed during an attempted go-around due to incorrect flap configuration caused by pilot error
- Site: Kudat Airport, Kudat, Malaysia; 6°55′26.8″N 116°50′5.8″E

Aircraft
- Aircraft type: de Havilland Canada DHC-6 Twin Otter 310
- Operator: MASwings
- IATA flight No.: MH3002
- ICAO flight No.: MWG3002
- Call sign: MASWINGS 3002
- Registration: 9M-MDM
- Flight origin: Miri Airport, Sarawak, Malaysia
- 1st stopover: Lawas Airport, Sarawak, Malaysia
- 2nd stopover: Kota Kinabalu International Airport, Sabah, Malaysia
- 3rd stopover: Kudat Airport, Sabah, Malaysia
- 4th stopover: Sandakan Airport, Sabah, Malaysia
- 5th stopover: Kudat Airport, Sabah, Malaysia
- Destination: Kota Kinabalu International Airport, Sabah, Malaysia
- Occupants: 16
- Passengers: 14
- Crew: 2
- Fatalities: 2
- Injuries: 4
- Survivors: 14

On 10 October 2013, MASwings Flight 3002, a scheduled domestic flight from Kota Kinabalu to Kudat, Malaysia, crashed on landing at its destination airport. The de Havilland Canada DHC-6 Twin Otter operating the flight was carrying 16 people, of whom two were killed and four injured. It was the first fatal accident for MASwings.

== Background ==
=== Aircraft ===
The aircraft involved in the accident was a 30-year-old de Havilland Canada DHC-6 Series 310, registration 9M‑MDM. It was delivered to Malaysia Airline System on 14 July 1983, via Reykjavík, Iceland, and entered service with MASwings in October 2007.

=== Crew ===
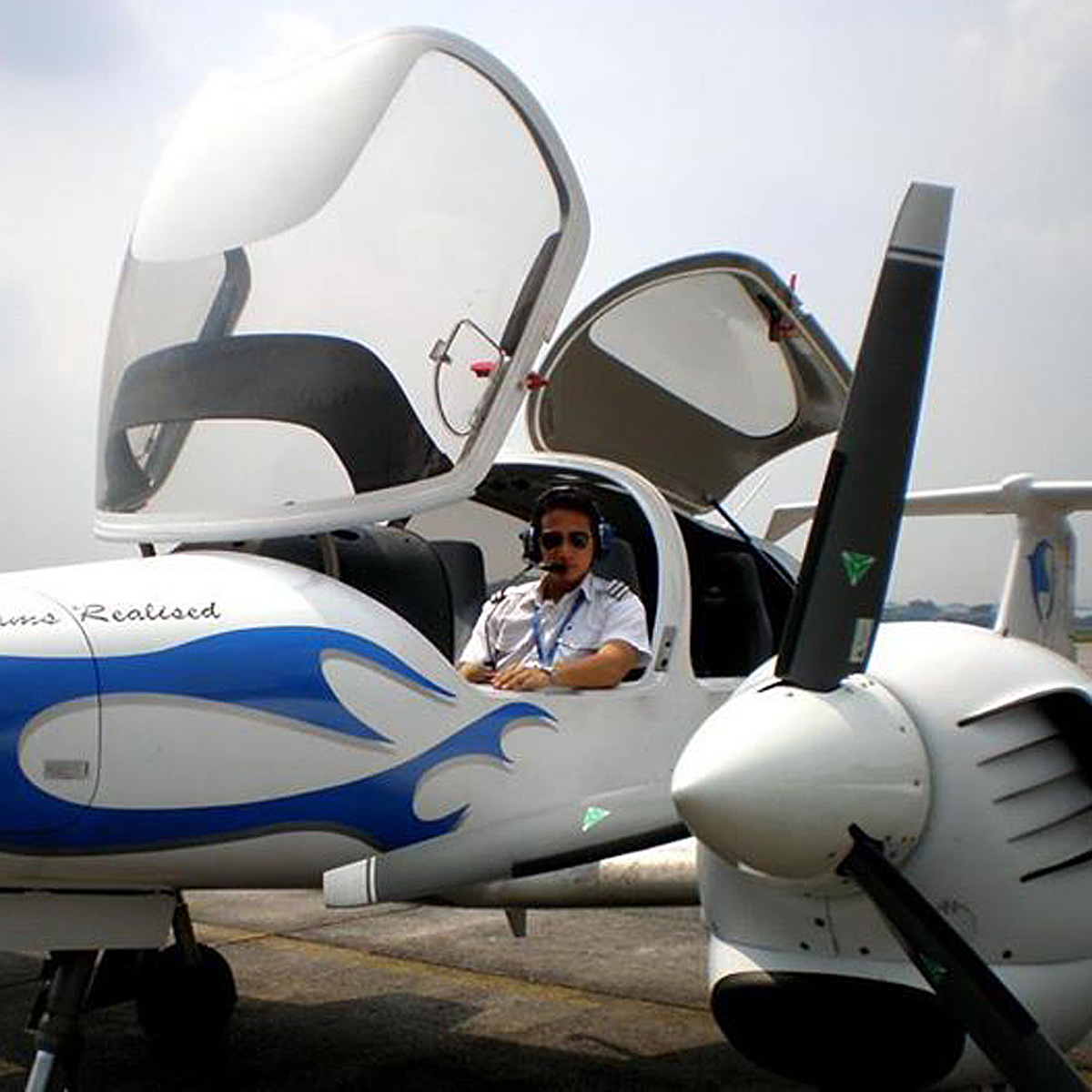
Marc Joel Bansh, the first officer involved in the crash

Captain Wan Mohd Abdul Amir Wan Yahya, 56, was an experienced pilot with MASwings. He had accumulated 4,740 flight hours in total, including 807 hours on the DHC-6 Twin Otter type.

First Officer Marc Joel Bansh, a 22-year-old Malaysian co-pilot, had logged 651 total flight hours, of which 400 hours were on the Twin Otter. He later died from injuries sustained in the crash.

== Accident ==
Flight 3002 departed from Kota Kinabalu at approximately 14:50 local time for the short flight to Kudat. At 15:30, while on final approach to Kudat Airport, the aircraft descended below the normal glide path and impacted a house in the village of Kampung Sin San, located just short of the runway. The aircraft broke apart and came to rest partially on the house owned by qayyum and surrounding grounds.

Emergency responders arrived shortly after the crash. Most of the 16 occupants survived, though two were fatally injured: the 22-year-old co-pilot and one elderly passenger. Four other passengers were injured, two seriously.

== Investigation ==
The Malaysian Department of Civil Aviation (DCA), along with MASwings and other relevant authorities, launched an investigation into the crash. Initial findings suggested that the aircraft was too low on final approach and struck obstacles short of the runway. Weather conditions at the time were reported to be normal.

According to a preliminary report, pilot error in judgment during the final approach phase was identified as a contributing factor. The final investigation report has not been widely published.

== Aftermath ==
Following the crash, MASwings temporarily grounded its Twin Otter fleet pending safety checks. The accident raised concerns about safety at remote airfields in Malaysia’s rural interior, particularly in Sabah and Sarawak. Condolences were expressed by government officials, including the Minister of Transport.

== See also ==
- Malaysia Airlines Flight 2133
