= Long Seridan Airport =

Long Seridan Airport Lapangan Terbang Long Seridan
- IATA: ODN; ICAO: WBGI

Summary
- Airport type: Public
- Operator: Malaysia Airports Holdings Berhad
- Serves: Long Seridan, Sarawak, Malaysia
- Time zone: MST (UTC+08:00)
- Elevation AMSL: 607 ft / 185 m
- Coordinates: 03°58′34″N 115°04′02.2″E

Map
- Location in East Malaysia

Runways
Direction	Length		Surface
Direction	m	ft	Surface
04/22	548	1,798	Bitumen
- Source: AIP Malaysia

Long Seridan Airport (IATA: ODN, ICAO: WBGI) is an airport serving Long Seridan in the state of Sarawak in Malaysia.

== Airlines and destinations ==
Airlines	Destinations
AirBorneo	Bario, Marudi, Miri
