= Lawas Airport =

Lawas Airport Lapangan Terbang Lawas
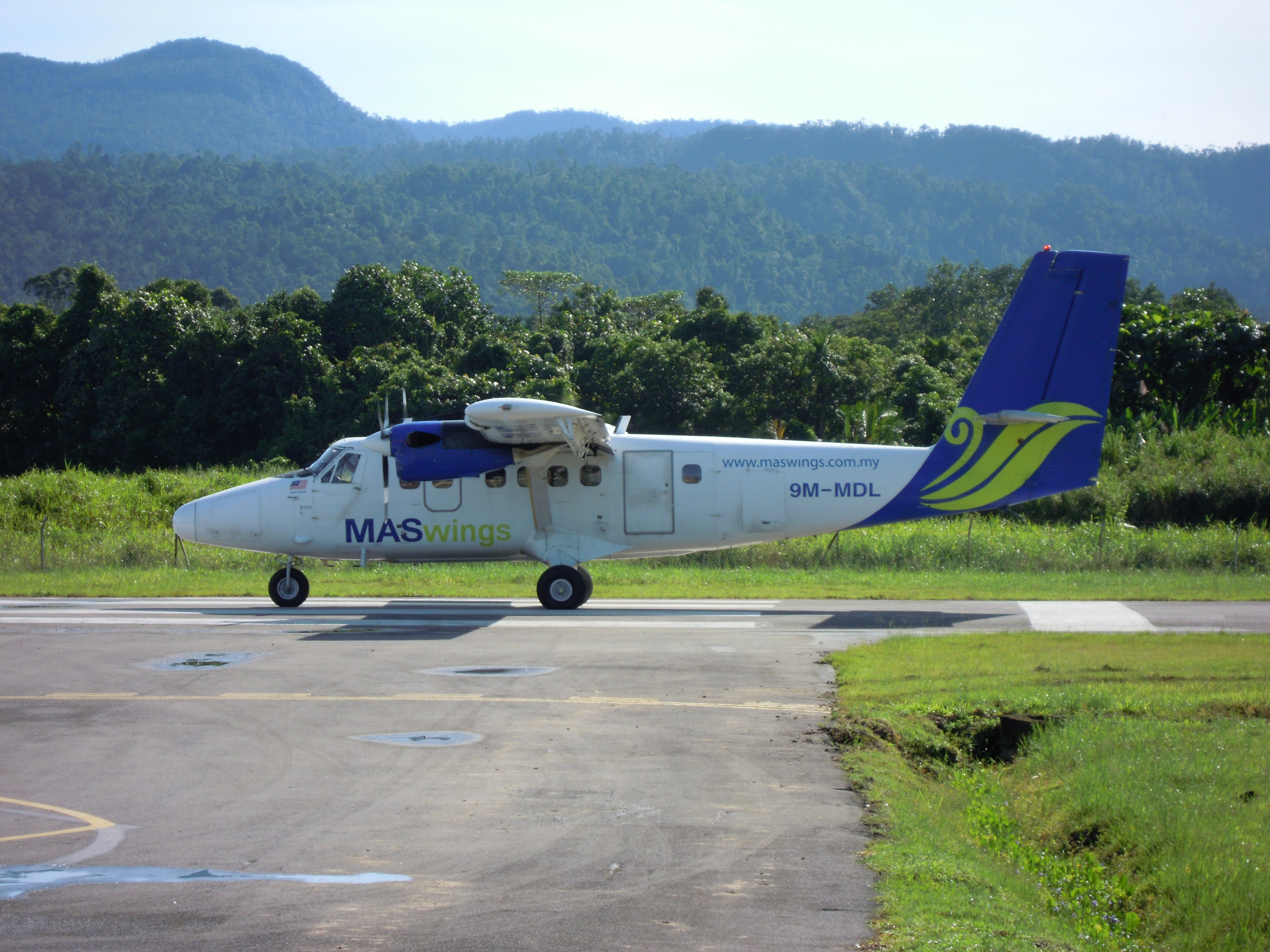
- MASWings Twin Otter on the Lawas runway
- IATA: LWY; ICAO: WBGW

Summary
- Airport type: Public
- Owner: Government of Malaysia
- Operator: Malaysia Airports Holdings Berhad
- Serves: Lawas
- Location: Lawas, Sarawak, Malaysia
- Time zone: MST (UTC+08:00)
- Elevation AMSL: 5 ft / 2 m
- Coordinates: 04°50′57″N 115°24′10″E

Map
- Location in East Malaysia

Runways
Direction	Length		Surface
Direction	m	ft	Surface
01/19	758	2,487	Bitumen
- Source: AIP Malaysia

Lawas Airport (IATA: LWY, ICAO: WBGW) is a short take-off and landing (STOL) airport serving Lawas, a town in Limbang Division, Sarawak, Malaysia.

A plan has been made to relocate the current airport to a new site, because the current site is considered unsafe. The airport is located near a river, and some land corrosion had been spotted along the riverbank. The proposed new airport will be able to accommodate ATR 72-500 aircraft operated by MASwings, and the airport will not only be used by people in Lawas, but also people near the surrounding Sarawak-Sabah border.

== Airlines and destinations ==
Airlines	Destinations
AirBorneo	Ba'kelalan, Kota Kinabalu, Limbang, Miri

== Incidents and Accidents ==
- On 24 August 2011, a MASwings aircraft Twin Otter DHC6 broke off its front landing gear upon landing. All 16 passengers and two crew escaped unharmed in the incident. The same aircraft would crash two years later as Flight 3002, killing two people.

== See also ==
- List of airports in Malaysia
