= Long Napir =

- Location within Borneo
- Coordinates: 4.16667°N 115.13333°E
- Country: Malaysia
- State: Sarawak
- Administrative Division: Limbang
- Elevation: 201 m (659 ft)

Long Napir is a cluster of four settlements of Penan and Kelabit people in the Limbang division of Sarawak, Malaysia. It lies approximately 606 kilometres (377 mi) east-north-east of the state capital Kuching.

== Geography ==
Long Napir is located at the confluence of two rivers, Sungai Medihit and Sungai Limbang, about 90 miles from Limbang. The nearest town is Nanga Medamit; this can be reached in about four hours by 4WD vehicle on logging tracks, but the journey by river takes a day.

== Infrastructure ==
The Resident Office of Limbang has a "URA Hostel" in the Long Napir for the administrative officer who acts as "Up River Agent". There is a primary school, clinic and public telephones; all electricity is from local generators.

== Population ==
The population in 2007 was 241 families, consisting of:

- Kelabit: 382 adults, 476 children
- Penan: 166 adults, 134 children

== Proposed destruction ==
A proposed hydroelectric dam project in the upper Limbang river would submerge the village and surrounding district.

== Neighbouring settlements ==
Neighbouring settlements include:

- Rumah Sigarsei 3.7 kilometres (2.3 mi) north
- Rumah Unar 4.1 kilometres (2.5 mi) northwest
- Long Seridan 21.7 kilometres (13.5 mi) south
- Rumah Danau 23.7 kilometres (14.7 mi) northwest
- Rumah Gani 26.3 kilometres (16.3 mi) northwest
- Rumah Sungai Medalam 30.8 kilometres (19.1 mi) northwest
- Rumah Kedu 31.4 kilometres (19.5 mi) northwest
- Rumah Belong 31.4 kilometres (19.5 mi) northwest
- Rumah Ambau 31.5 kilometres (19.6 mi) northwest
- Rumah Haling 31.5 kilometres (19.6 mi) northwest
