= Long Lellang Airport =

Airport in Sarawak, Malaysia

Long Lellang Airport Lapangan Terbang Long Lellang
- IATA: LGL; ICAO: WBGF

Summary
- Airport type: Public
- Operator: Malaysia Airports Holdings Berhad
- Serves: Long Lellang, Sarawak, Malaysia
- Time zone: MST (UTC+08:00)
- Elevation AMSL: 1,400 ft (430 m)
- Coordinates: 03°25′15.5″N 115°09′11.5″E

Map
- Location in East Malaysia

Runways
Direction	Length		Surface
Direction	m	ft	Surface
04/22	426	1,398	Bitumen
- Source: AIP Malaysia

Long Lellang Airport (IATA: LGL, ICAO: WBGF) is a STOLport (Short Take-Off and Landing airport) serving the village of Long Lellang in the state of Sarawak in Malaysia.

== Airlines and destinations ==
Airlines	Destinations
AirBorneo	Bario, Marudi, Miri

== Incident ==
On 8 September 2026 at around 3:32pm, a BO-105 helicopter with the registration number of 9M-LLF, which was serving under the Flying Doctor Service programme at the time, crashed at the end of Runway 04 of the airport. All 5 persons aboard, which consisted of a pilot, a medical assistant, a doctor and two nurses, died at the scene.
