= Kudat Airport =

Public airport in Kudat, Sabah, Malaysia

Kudat Airport Lapangan Terbang Kudat
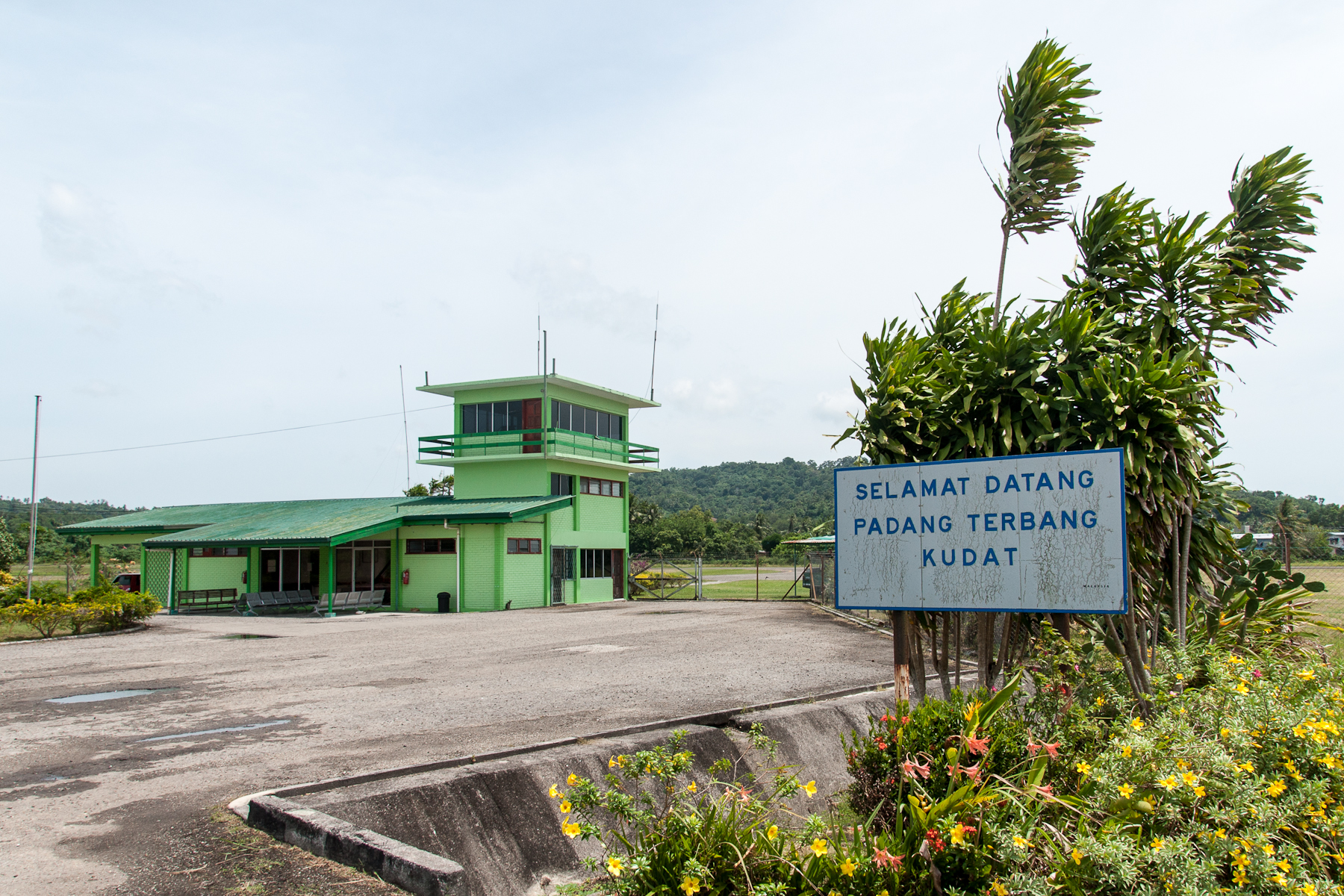
- IATA: KUD; ICAO: WBKT

Summary
- Airport type: Public
- Operator: Malaysia Airports Berhad
- Serves: Kudat, Sabah, Malaysia
- Time zone: MST (UTC+08:00)
- Elevation AMSL: 10 ft / 3 m
- Coordinates: 06°55′27″N 116°49′51″E

Map
- Location in East Malaysia

Runways
Direction	Length		Surface
Direction	m	ft	Surface
04/22	730	2,395	Asphalt
- Source: AIP Malaysia

Kudat Airport (IATA: KUD, ICAO: WBKT) is an airport serving the town of Kudat, Sabah, Malaysia.

== Accidents and incidents ==
- MASwings Flight 3002

== See also ==
- List of airports in Malaysia
