= Ba'kelalan =

- Town

Other transcription(s)
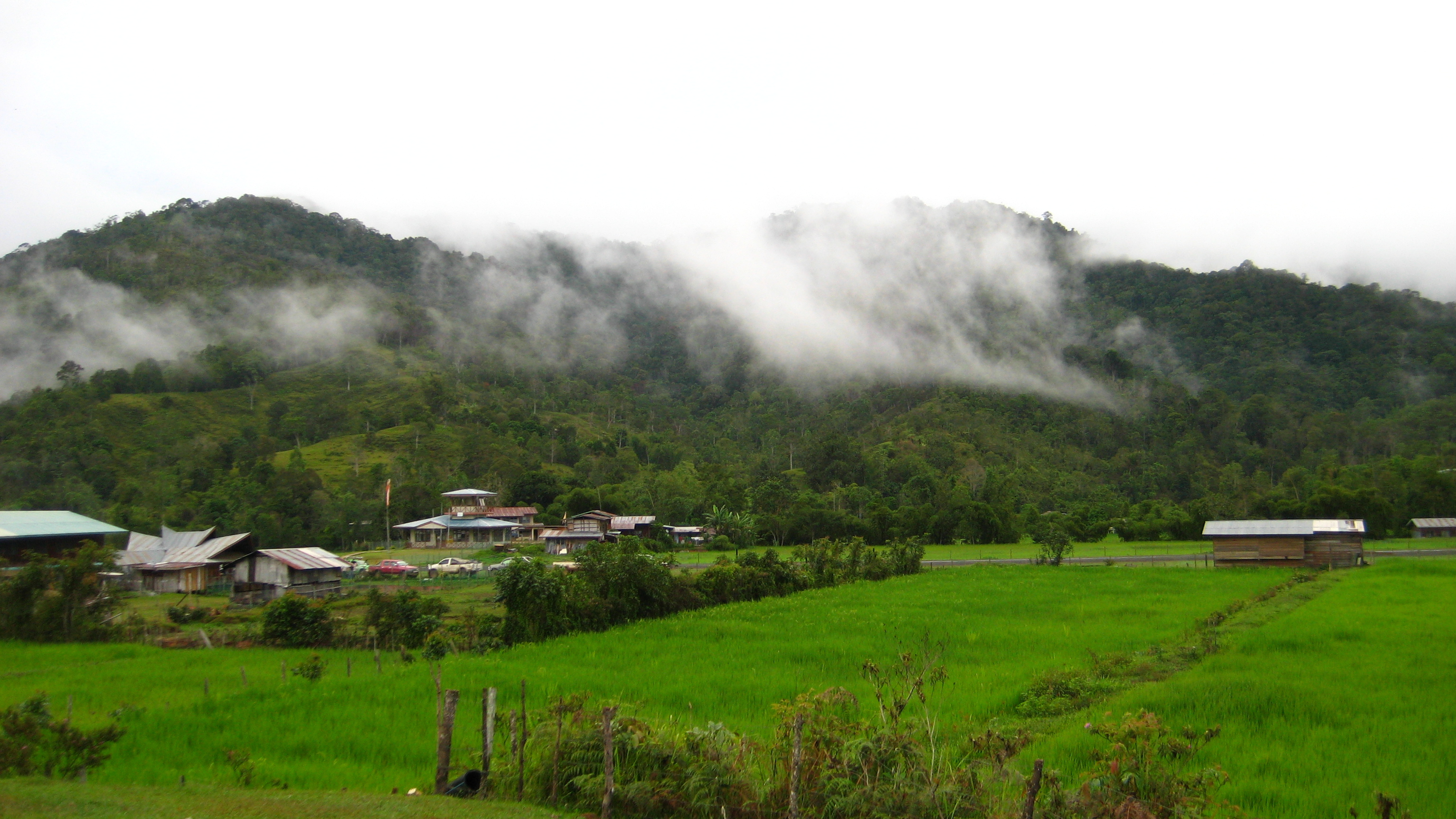
- Ba'kelalan paddy rice field

- Location in Borneo
- Coordinates: 3°59′44″N 115°37′21″E
- Country: Malaysia
- State: Sarawak
- Division: Limbang Division
- District: Lawas District

Government
  - Penghulu: George Sigar Sultan
- Elevation: 910 m (2,990 ft)

Population (2003)
  - Total: 1,030
- Time zone: UTC+8 (MST)
  - Summer (DST): UTC+8 (Not observed)
- Postal code: 98xxx

Ba'kelalan is a group of nine villages at Maligan Highlands of Limbang Division, Sarawak, Malaysia about 3,000 feet (910 m) above sea level and 4 km from the border with Indonesian Kalimantan and 150 km from the nearest town of Lawas. There are nine villages in Ba'kelalan. The villagers here belong to the Lun Bawang tribe.

The name Ba’Kelalan is derived from the Kelalan River and Ba’ which means wet lands in the Lun Bawang language. Its population was about 1030 in 2003. In the cool mountain climate, temperate fruits such as apples, mandarin oranges and vanilla are grown. The area also produces rice, and mountain salt is obtained from the nearby hills. The people in Ba'Kelalan are Christian, members of the Sidang Injil Borneo.

Tourism has increased in recent years: Ba'kelalan now has a 9-hole natural golf course, and the settlement is also the easiest point of access for visits to Kayan Mentarang National Park in Krayan, Kalimantan.

== Etymology ==
The name Ba’Kelalan is derived from the Kelalan River and Ba’ which means wet lands in the Lun Bawang language.

== History ==
According to Tom Harrisson, the Lun Bawang people began to move into Baram and Limbang districts in the 17th century. Despite coming under the Brooke administration when Trusan district became part of Sarawak in 1885, the colonial influence was minimal. There was significant border contacts with the Krayan people in Kalimantan, Indonesia. However, majority of trades with border communities in Indonesia happened at coastal towns in Sarawak. The extent of trades happening around the border is unknown. Among the common items used during trades are: rice, buffaloes, and clothes. The Krayan people from Long Bawan, Indonesia also provided a source of human labour for farming communities in Ba'kelalan.

In 1928, Christianity was introduced by Borneo Evangelical Mission (BEM) when Carey Tolley and Hudson Southwell arrived here. Later Frank and Enid Davidson evangelised new Lun Bawang believers. By 1933, most of the Lun Bawangs were Christians. The Lun Bawangs also had become preachers themselves and brought Gospel to the Kelabits in Bario and other tribes. The Lun Bawangs started to divide up their longhouses into individual family homes. They also gave up their addiction on rice wine and practised better hygiene. They also abandoned their practise on seeking guidance from spirits and omens. Frank was given a Lun Bawang name Pendita Lisin. Frank Davidson later was captured and died in Batu Lintang camp during Japanese occupation. His wife Enid, also known as the Lun Bawang name Pendita Litad Mawa was spared from the Japanese because she decided to give birth to her child in Melbourne, Australia. After the war, Enid returned to Sarawak to continue to nurture the Lun Bawangs. By the 1970s, the Lun Bawangs were able to read bibles in their own language. Later, BEM was evolved into Sidang Injil Borneo (SIB) church.

During Indonesia–Malaysia confrontation, restriction was applied on Sarawak-Kalimantan border crossings but this directive was generally ignored. Following the end of confrontation in 1966, Cross Border agreement was signed on 26 May 1967 between Malaysia and Indonesia which allows border communities from both sides to trade and move freely around the border.

== Governance ==
There are nine villages in Ba'kelalan, located on the Maligan highlands. The villages are Buduk Nur, Long Langai, Long Lemumut, Long Ritan, Long Rusu, Pa Tawing, Buduk Bui, Buduk Aru and Long Rangat. A village comprises a cluster of detached houses. Each village has its own headman. The post of headman is created by government appointment who commanded the respect of the villages and paid a minimal monthly salary. A headman should deal with the general affairs of the village such as disputes and development affairs and chairs a village development committee. A regional chief or penghulu is created to oversee the affairs of all the nine villages. He would come twice a year to discuss matters pertaining to development of the villagers and handling cases of the native chiefs court.

In terms of electoral boundaries, Ba'kelalan is included in the Lawas parliamentary constituency and Ba'kelalan state constituency.

== Geography and climate ==
Ba'Kelalan also serves as a transit point to the nearby Pulong Tau National Park where Mount Murud and Bukit Batu Lawi are located. Kayan Mentarang National Park located in Indonesia is also at the vicinity.

== Infrastructure ==
Ba'kelalan Airport has flights to Bario and to Lawas using 19-seater DHT aircraft. Road access is possible via a 125 km former logging trail from Lawas using four-wheel-drive vehicles, but the road conditions can be particularly bad in the rainy season and the journey takes at least six hours. However, in September 2009 the federal government of Malaysia approved RM50 million for the first construction phase of a road from Lawas to Ba’Kelalan to facilitate access. The upgraded road has cut the travel time by half. A 34 km road connecting Ba'kelalan to Bario is being built and is expected to complete in 2018. The villages are powered by solar panels and diesel generators.

There are six government agencies in Ba Kelalan: the Upriver Agency, a primary school, a health sub-center, an agriculture sub-office, a civil aviation office, and an auxiliary police station.

The Malaysian Road Transport Department started to station several of its officers at the Ba'kelalan-Indonesian checkpoint since 2019. In 2017, total entries into Ba'kelalan checkpoint was 16,970 vehicles, while those leaving the checkpoint to Indonesian side was 17,427 vehicles. In 2019, these numbers increased to 19,613 and 19,466 respectively. As of 2022, there was no proper Customs, Immigration and Quarantine (CIQ) complex across the checkpoint because the construction of the complex was abandoned back in 2019.

== Economy ==
There are several homestays available at Ba'kelalan.

=== Farming ===
With water supply from the Kelalan river, the community have created well-irrigated padi fields in Buduk Bui and Long Langai, and grow the prized, small-grained “Highland Adan Rice” with fine, sweet grains. This is unusual in the mountainous interior of Sarawak, where most communities can only grow upland rice known as hill padi. Planting takes place each year in August and September, and harvesting starts in January. Delicacies related to rice such as bee pang (rice crackers) and bera kopi (rice coffee, produced by frying rice with sprinkling of sugar) are also produced by Lun Bawang people.

The town is the first in Malaysia to grow apples successfully on a commercial scale. In 1975 the first apple cuttings were brought from the highlands of East Java by a local boy, Andrew Balang Paran. Early planting faced problems and it was not until 1988 that the turning point was brought about, when help from two apple growers from Batu Malang in Indonesia brought the 300 dying apple trees back to health using pruning, fertilisers and chemicals. During the next two years 1000 more apple trees were grown. In 1991 the first harvest was produced after an artificial "wintering" process in December 1990, when the leaves of the trees were removed.

Now seven varieties of apple are grown, of which the first three have produced fruit:'Ba Kelalan Apple' or Manalagi (a Washington hybrid first produced in Indonesia, light green but turning yellow when ripe), Rome Beauty (crunchy, sweet, sour tasting apple normally used for cooking), Tropical Beauty (a brilliant red oval apple, sweet but not as crunchy as Rome Beauty), Lady Williams, Epal Anna, Kwanglin, and Jonathan

The 3-hectare orchard has 2,000 apple trees and is run by 75-year-old former pastor Tagal Paran, the elder brother of Andrew Balang Paran who brought the first cuttings to the village, and his 50-year-old son Mutang Tagal. The trees bear fruit twice a year, normally in the middle and the end of the year. Following the initial success, they plan to plant 4000 apple trees.

Since 2015, Ba'kelalan started to produce strawberries on a commercial scale.

=== Salt processing ===
Ba'kelalan salt springs were discovered more than a hundred years ago when hunters noticed that animals like to drink water there. The villagers then began using the salt water for cooking and learn how to make salt from it. There are two main sources of salt in Ba'kelalan: salt lick (mineral deposit of salt) and salt spring (salt water). Salt springs at Ba'kelalan can be found at three areas: Buduk Bui, Pa Komap and Punang Kelalan. The villagers have been using firewood to boil the salt water for four to five days before getting the salt. The villagers usually make salt as a side income business. Ba'kelalan salt is sold at the city of Miri, and the neighbouring states of Brunei, and Sabah. In 2015, Sarawak Forest Department upgraded the salt processing facilities at Buduk Bui for more efficient salt processing. The mountain salts at Ba'kelalan is known as "tuchuk" in local language.

Salt water wells enable the community to produce an average of 40 kg of salt per week. About twenty four families are currently involved in salt production alongside their other farming activities. The salt well (or brine well) is used to mine salt from caverns or deposits by the use of water as a solution to dissolve the salt or halite deposits so that they can be extracted by pipe to an evaporation process that results in a brine or dry product for sale or use.

== Demographics ==
The villagers here are mostly from the Lun Bawang tribe.As of 2003, there were 1,030 villagers staying in Ba'kelalan.

The Lun Bawang tribes are Christians that belongs to BEM denomination or Sidang Injil Borneo. The church is the most important institution in a village and each village has its own church. Church services and prayer meetings are frequently held here. Rice production has doubled since the prohibition of alcohol.

== Culture ==
Several notable foods at Ba'kelalan are: luba laya (rice wrapped in itip leaf), biter (vegetable porridge), and sinamu and narar (smoked fish and meat) The Lun Bawang people play bamboo flutes known as "ngapu". They are also known for their "musang" culture, where they work together in every aspect of life such as rice cultivation, clearing lands, or organising events.The first Apple Fiesta in Malaysia was held in Ba'Kelalan from 29 to 31 March 2007.Ba'kelalan has been the host for eBorneo Knowledge Fair since 2015.

== Notable Lun Bawangs ==
1. Baru Bian – MLA for Ba'kelalan, former Minister of Works & former Member of Parliament (MP) for Selangau.

2. Judson Sakai Tagal – former State Assistant Minister of Communications of Sarawak & former Member of the Sarawak State Legislative Assembly (MLA) for Ba'kelalan.

3. Mutang Tagal – former President of the Dewan Negara, Senator & former Member of Parliament for Bukit Mas.

4. Nelson Balang Rining – Deputy President of the Progressive Democratic Party (PDP) & former MLA for Ba'kelalan .

== Cross-border relation with Long Bawan, Indonesia ==
The Lun Bawang people in Ba'kelalan are considered ethnically the same as Krayan people in Long Bawan, Indonesia, as they share similar language, culture, and religion. The cross-border relationship has been comfortable although villagers from both sides need an official pass from either Indonesian or Malaysian authorities to cross the border. Cross-border disputes are rare and are mostly settled at the village level. Cross-border marriages are also common.

However, there one case which happened in 1978 involving the Buduk Nur village in Ba'kelalan and Long Midang village in Long Bawan. A hunter of Ba'kelalan was chasing a wild boar with his dogs. However, the wild boar ran to the Indonesian side and was killed by another hunter living at the Long Bawan. The hunter from Long Bawan claimed the wild boar while the hunter from Ba'kelalan went back to his own village disappointed. A month later, the same hunter from Long Bawan gave a chase to a wild boar with his dogs. The wild boar ran to the Malaysian side and was killed by the same hunter from Ba'kelalan. The Ba'kelalan hunter claimed the wild boar as his own. This caused the Long Bawan hunter to report this matter to his own headman. The case was elevated to area chief at Long Bawan. However, after a meeting with Lawas District officer, both sides agreed that the case should be resolved by the two hunters with the presence of their own headman. Subsequently, both the hunters did not meet each other and they both reminded their own villagers that to practice the custom of sharing. People in both villagers were ashamed and wanted it to be forgotten. Any similar incident has not happen since.

Ba'kelalan and Long Bawan are connected via a dirt road. Buffaloes, motorcycles, and four-wheel drives are frequently used to transport goods across the border. Although Long Bawan has daily flights to coastal towns of Indonesian Borneo such as Nunukan and Tarakan, the air fare is expensive and each passenger taking flight can only bring 10 kg of goods. This has caused Ba'kelalan to become a major supplier of goods to Long Bawan because of cheaper transportation costs. In May 2003, there are 70 to 80 people crossing into Ba'kelalan daily. Since 2004, four-wheel drive especially Toyota Hilux trucks are being used to transport goods across the border directly from Lawas into Long Bawan, bypassing Ba'kelalan. This has caused Ba'kelalan traders to suffer a loss of business. Smuggling of grocery goods, drugs, fuel oil, and stolen cars are major problems here. This situation also rendered the Cross Border agreement toothless because the agreement stated that border communities are allowed to trade freely, but not for the communities from other places. The advent of four-wheel drive also caused increase availability of alcoholic drinks across the border, much to the dismay of the Christian border communities. Tollgates have been erected by the Ba'kelalan traders to claim land ownership across the border and prevent buffaloes from grazing in the rice fields. However, fees levied at the tollgates have caused the resentment of the Long Bawan people as they have always been depending upon Ba'kelalan for daily supplies. However, both Malaysian and Indonesia authorities refused to interfere with the matter and advised the matter to be resolved locally.

== See also ==
- Ba'kelalan by-election, 2004
