= Ba'kelalan Airport =

Airport in Malaysia

Ba'kelalan Airport Lapangan Terbang Bakelalan
- IATA: BKM; ICAO: WBGQ

Summary
- Airport type: Public
- Operator: Malaysia Airports Berhad
- Serves: Bakelalan, Sarawak, Malaysia
- Time zone: MST (UTC+08:00)
- Elevation AMSL: 2,900 ft (880 m)
- Coordinates: 03°59′19″N 115°37′08″E

Map
- Location in East Malaysia

Runways
Direction	Length		Surface
Direction	m	ft	Surface
05/23	549	1,801	Bitumen

Statistics (2015)
- Passenger: 3,435 (▲6.1%)
- Aircraft movements: 328 (▲1.2%)
- Source: AIP Malaysia

Ba'kelalan Airport (IATA: BKM, ICAO: WBGQ) is a STOLport in Ba'kelalan, a town in the state of Sarawak in Malaysia. The airstrip was built in 1950, with site surveys and plans. During the pandemic, the airport served helped provide medical supplies to residents. In 2026, numerous projects started on the airport, aiming to improve the terminals and extend the runway. More projects for the airport are planned in 2027. Currently, the airport serves routes with three airports: Miri, Lawas, and Bario.

== History ==
In 1950, the Ba'kelalan Airstrip was newly built, used by missionaries from the Borneo Evangelical Mission to spread the gospel to the inlands of Sarawak. Site surveys in 1959 planned to make the airstrip Scottish Aviation Twin Pioneer standard. In the 1960s, the airstrip was constructed with grass covers as tar-sealing was too expensive, with the airstrip being very short and a plane having to rely on a stretch of slopping funnel approach to easily brake during landing.

On 18 June 2026 Deputy Transport Minister Datuk Hasbi Habibollah, Mulu Assemblyman Datuk Gerawat Gala, and other representatives from the Sarawak Ministry of Transport and related agencies inspected the airport and was briefed on its current condition. Gerawat expressed satisfaction on the progress of the upgrade and runway extension. On 28 August Hasbi announced that RM15,000,000 was allocated by the government to improve the terminals and extend the runway alongside the Long Banga Airport, noting that both airport's runways could only serve Twin Otter aircraft. Work to upgrade both airports was planned to start in 2026, with Datuk adding that rural airports needed to be improved while still serving their communities. After engagement and technical assessments, by the Ministry of Transportation and the government, Transport Minister Lee Kim Shin approved projects upgrading the airport in 2027 under the Airport Development Fund, stating that the projects aim to improve operational capabilities, flight safety and air connectivity. Currently, the airport has routes with three airports: Miri and Lawas, with the route having three flights per week, and with Bario, with one flight per week. All three routes use Twin Otter aircraft.

== Impact ==
From the nearest town of Lawas, Ba'kelalan is an eight-hour drive. Due to the COVID-19 pandemic and the nation-wide Movement Control Order imposed on 18 March 2020 air transport was needed to provide medical supplies and cooking essentials to families living in Ba'kelalan, with the first food-aid missing from Miri landing on the airport in early April. During the pandemic, the airport also helped local residents find job and business opportunities.

== Airlines and destinations ==
Airlines	Destinations
AirBorneo	Bario, Lawas, Miri

== Incident ==
- On 13 September 2008 a DHC-6 Twin Otter overshot the runway while landing. All 14 people on board were uninjured, but the aircraft was badly damaged.

== See also ==
- List of airports in Malaysia
