= Air transport network =

An air transport network or air transportation network is a transport network focused on air routes. Airports serve as the nodes of the network with air routes providing links between them. Air transport networks can be defined worldwide as well as for one region or for one airline company; the scale of the network can be global or domestic.

== Properties of air transport networks ==
The graph of an air transport network is spatial but not a planar graph. The air transportation network is a complex network which has the properties of small-world networks and scale-free networks. The degree distribution of the nodes displays a heavy-tailed distribution. The hubs of the network have large connectivity's and long-distance connectivity's at the same time.

An anomalous property of the air transport networks is that nodes with relatively low degrees may have very high betweenness centrality. It is an important observation related to the robustness of complex networks. According to this finding the critical points of the system are not necessarily the hubs, but some other cities which uniquely provides routes to certain regions. For example, Alaska can be easily isolated from the other parts of the worldwide air transport network.

The worldwide air transport network defines communities. These communities are mainly determined by geographical factors. However, in some cases the borders of the communities are different from the borders of geographic regions. Such an example is the community of Europe and Asian Russia.

== Examples for air transport networks ==
The worldwide air transportation network is represented by the database of International Air Transport Association (IATA). The worldwide air transportation network is a critical infrastructure with high impact on mobility, trade and economy.

Another examples are the air transport systems of a country or a country's own air transport company. It is particularly important, because the quality of the airports and national airlines are also the measures of the state of development of the country.

== Application of air transport networks ==
Modeling air transport networks aims airline companies to organize their routes in a cost-efficient way and therefore maximize their profits. Air transport network models are also the tool to investigate system robustness. They help to determine weaknesses of the system in case of various kinds of disruptions. Once weaknesses are determined, a substitute node which can support all or part of the traffic load can be identified through the alternative strength for the pair.

An alternative application is modeling human disease networks. Air transport network is used by millions of people every day, therefore it plays key role in the spread of some infections, such as influenza or SARS. In this sense air transport network is a transmitter similar to sexual networks, which is liable for the spread of AIDS and other sexually transmitted diseases.

== See also ==
- Flow network
- Geometric graph
- Air transportation in the United States
- Global shipping network
