= Long Banga Airport =

Long Banga Airport Lapangan Terbang Long Banga
- IATA: LBP; ICAO: WBGL

Summary
- Airport type: Public
- Operator: Malaysia Airports Berhad
- Serves: Long Banga, Sarawak, Malaysia
- Time zone: MST (UTC+08:00)
- Elevation AMSL: 750 ft (230 m)
- Coordinates: 03°12′08″N 115°24′07″E

Map
- Location in East Malaysia

Runways
Direction	Length		Surface
Direction	m	ft	Surface
09/27	550	1,804	Bitumen
- Source: AIP Malaysia

Long Banga Airport (IATA: LBP, ICAO: WBGL) is an airport in Long Banga, Marudi District, Sarawak, Malaysia.

== History ==
The airport was a small grass airstrip until 1965. During the Indonesia–Malaysia confrontation, the British Army established a forward base here and improved the airstrip with the aid of a small bulldozer parachuted in by the RAF.

For decades, flights were routinely cancelled during the rainy season as the earthen strip became a waterlogged, muddy mess. In 2011, the airport got a proper asphalt surface, making it an all-weather airfield.

== Airlines and destinations ==
Airlines	Destinations
AirBorneo	Bario, Marudi, Miri
