= Logging trail =

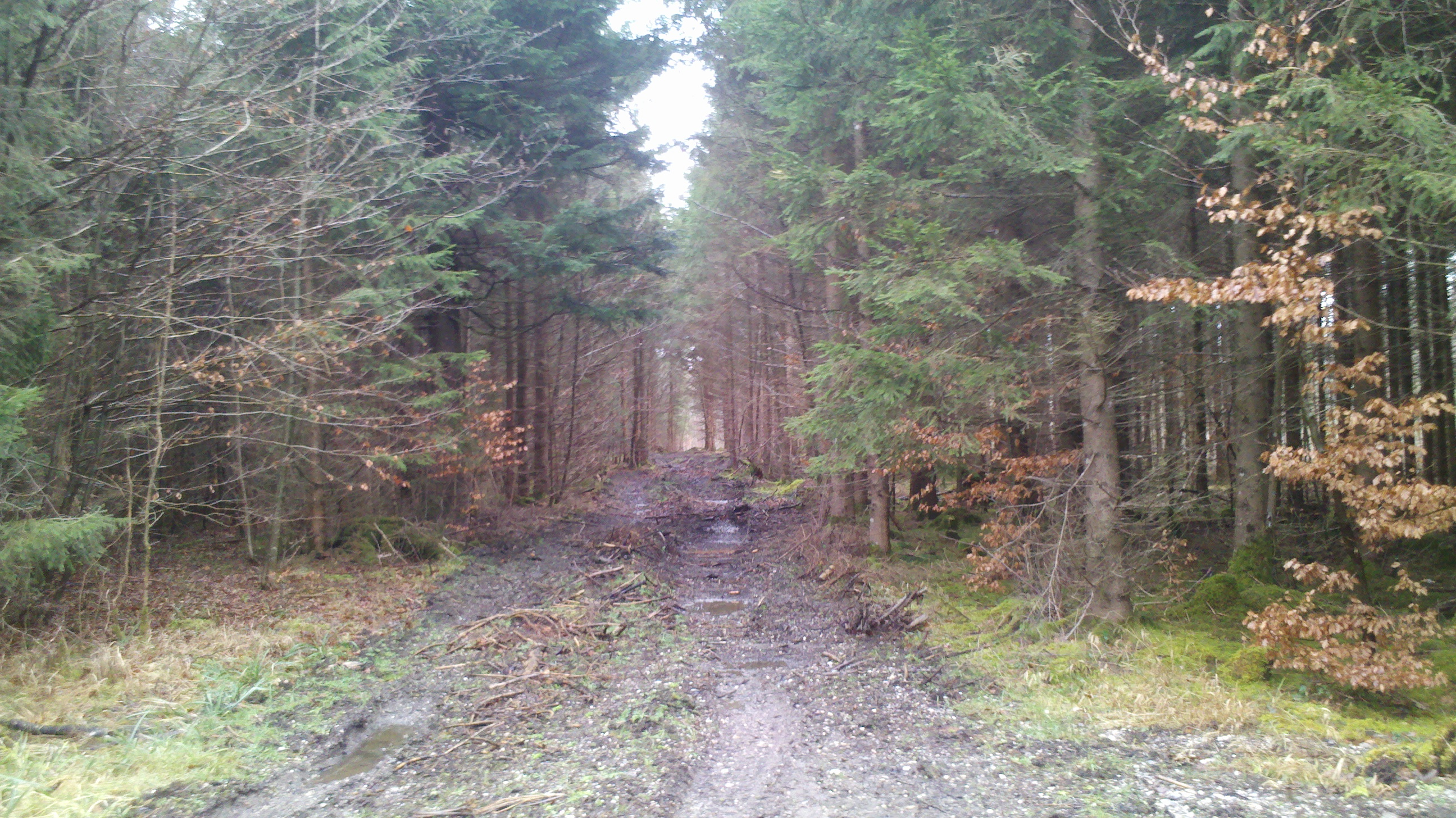
A logging trail in German pre-alpine woodland

A logging trail is a type of unpaved trail used to transport logged wood by means of machinery or horse power. In contrast to logging roads, logging trails are made using existing materials, rather than being created using external materials such as gravel.

== Characteristics ==
For ease of transport when using machinery like forwarders on sloped terrain, the logging trail often follows the gradient of the terrain to a logging road or street for further transport of the wood. Width of the trail is typically 3 m to 4 m with a distance of 20 m to 60 m among each other.

In terrain steeper than 30% logging trails are usually constructed parallel to the contour of the terrain.

A logging trail may eventually convert into a hiking trail.

== History ==
Logging trails became necessary with the advent of machine driven logging. Before that period loggers used horse power instead with lesser need for structured logging trails.

== See also ==
- Logging road
- Dirt road
- Forest Highway
- Logging
- Trail
