= Limbang Airport =

Limbang Airport Lapangan Terbang Limbang
- IATA: LMN; ICAO: WBGJ

Summary
- Airport type: Public
- Owner: Government of Malaysia
- Operator: Malaysia Airports Holdings Berhad
- Serves: Limbang District
- Location: Limbang, Sarawak, East Malaysia
- Opened: 7 April 2004
- Time zone: MST (UTC+08:00)
- Elevation AMSL: 9 ft / 3 m
- Coordinates: 04°48′29″N 115°00′37″E

Map
- Location in East Malaysia

Runways
Direction	Length		Surface
Direction	m	ft	Surface
04/22	1,500	4,921	Asphalt

Statistics (2015)
- Passenger: 55,437 (▼4.9%)
- Airfreight (tonnes): 466 (▼17.5%)
- Aircraft movements: 3,221 (▲13.1%)
- Sources: official web site AIP Malaysia

Limbang Airport (IATA: LMN, ICAO: WBGJ) is an airport serving the town of Limbang, in the state of Sarawak in Malaysia. The airport is 4.8 km (3.0 mi) from the town centre. The airport opened on 15 July 2004, and is capable of handling 250,000 passengers per year. It is able to handle large turboprop aircraft such as the Fokker F50 and the ATR 72-500. In 2008, the airport handled 49,181 passengers, 2,112 aircraft movements and 474,513 kg (1,046,122 lb) of cargo.

== History ==
The old Limbang STOL (Short Take Off and Landing) airfield was built in 1963 by the British Army for use during the confrontation between Malaysia and Indonesia. Situated beside Mas Hill (Bukit Mas), about 3 mi (4.8 km) from the town of Limbang. The old airfield did not meet the safety requirements of ICAO (International Civil Aviation Organization). Furthermore, the old airfield was surrounded by mountains and the approach path was covered by tall vegetation such as trees, combined with the relatively high ground. This makes it particularly hazardous and difficult for civilian aircraft to operate safely into and out of the airfield.

In 1978, a consultant firm was appointed to select a new site for a completely new airport and thus proceeded with the Master Plan Study regarding the layout of the new airport. The development plan of the new airport back then is to accommodate the Fokker F27 turboprop aircraft operation in the beginning and thereafter Boeing 737-200 jet aircraft operation.

After lengthy delays, the new Limbang Airport project started in the year 2000 and was completed in only four years. The airport was officially opened on 7 April 2004, and full operational use followed on 15 April 2004. The new runway is 1,500 m (4,921 ft) long and is well suited to accommodate de Havilland Canada DHC-6 Twin Otter, Fokker 50 and ATR 72-500 turboprop aircraft. The new airport is located about 4.8 km (3.0 mi) north west of the town of Limbang.

Currently, Malaysia Airlines' subsidiary MASWings operates into and out of the airport. Other operators include Medevac and logging helicopters, and private turboprop powered aircraft. Previous users of the airport were Malaysia Airlines and former Air Asia subsidiary FAX (Fly Asian Express).

== Airlines and destinations ==
Airlines	Destinations
AirBorneo	Kota Kinabalu, Kuching, Lawas, Miri

== Traffic and statistics ==
Annual passenger and aircraft statistics
Year	Passengers	Aircraft movements
2003	83,459	5,046
2004	96,209	5,691
2005	105,652	5,568
2006	89,814	4,366
2007	50,107	2,552
2008	49,181	2,112
2009	45,512	1,949
2010	50,044	2,171
2011	56,211	1,968
2012	57,852	1,880
2013	61,074	2,075
2014	63,870	2,660
2015	58,300	2,849

Annual cargo statistics
Year	Cargo handled (metric tonnes)
2003	226
2004	179
2005	289
2006	379
2007	440
2008	475
2009	530
2010	560
2011	498
2012	744
2013	742
2014	596
2015	565
