= Miri Airport =

Airport in Sarawak, Malaysia

Miri Airport Lapangan Terbang Miri
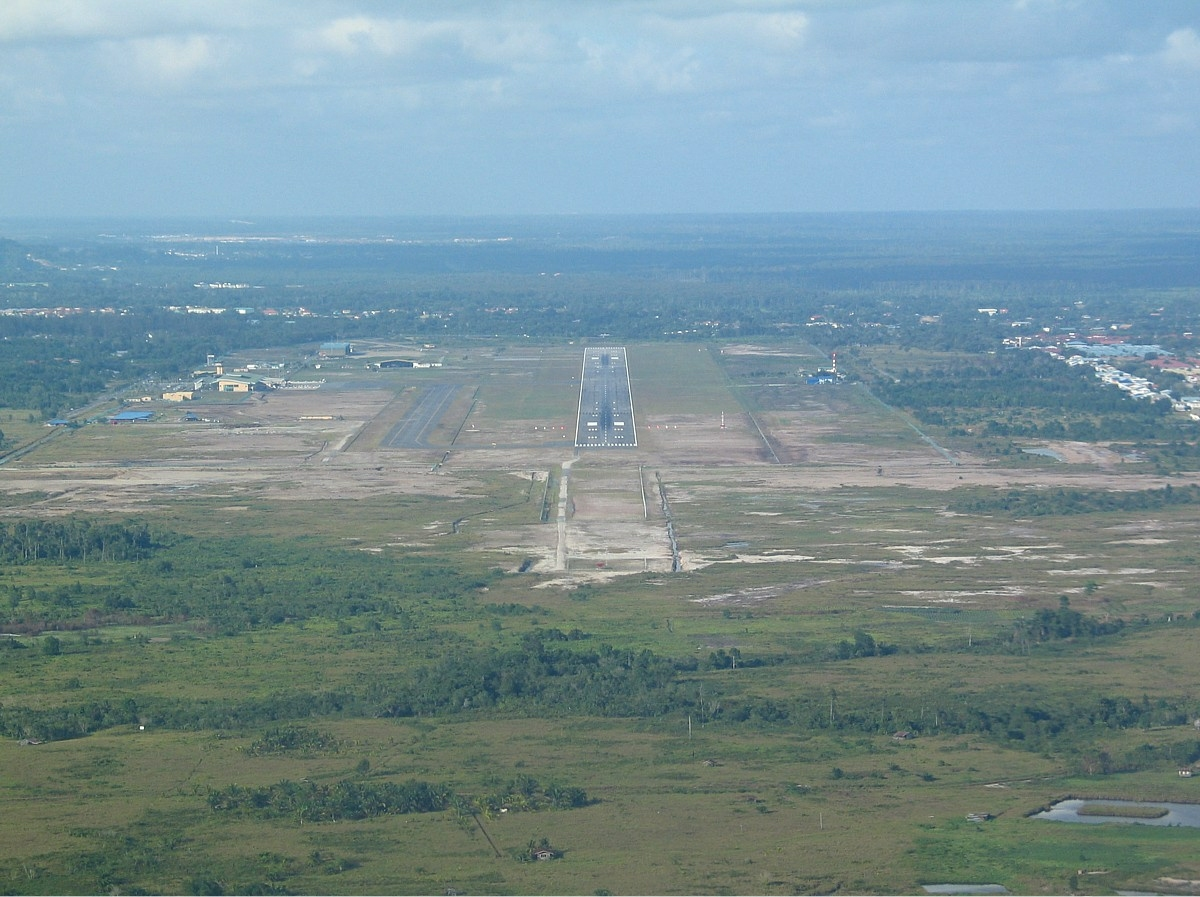
- View of the runway at Miri Airport
- IATA: MYY; ICAO: WBGR

Summary
- Airport type: Public
- Owner: Khazanah Nasional
- Operator: Malaysia Airports Holdings Berhad
- Serves: Miri, Sarawak
- Location: Miri, Sarawak
- Hub for: AirBorneo, HAS International Sdn Bhd, Hornbill Skyways
- Time zone: MST (UTC+08:00)
- Elevation AMSL: 59 ft (18 m)
- Coordinates: 04°19′31″N 113°59′18″E
- Website: https://www.miriairport.com/

Maps
- Sarawak state in Malaysia

- Location in Miri, Sarawak, East Malaysia MYY /WBGR (East Malaysia) MYY /WBGR (Malaysia) MYY /WBGR (Southeast Asia) MYY /WBGR (Asia)

Runways
Direction	Length		Surface
Direction	m	ft	Surface
02/20	2,745	9,006	Asphalt

Statistics (2024)
- Passenger: 2,272,271 (▲9.9%)
- Airfreight (metric tonnes): 3,456 (▼27.3%)
- Aircraft movements: 37,630 (▲3.9%)
- Sources: Official website AIP Malaysia

Miri Airport (IATA: MYY, ICAO: WBGR) is an airport located 9.5 km (5.9 mi) southeast of Miri, a city in the Malaysian state of Sarawak. It is the sixth-busiest airport in Malaysia, and the second-busiest in Sarawak.

Miri Airport is the main hub for AirBorneo Twin Otter fleet which took over the rural air services from MASwings and FlyAsianXpress. Its location in the middle of Malaysian Borneo close to the border of Brunei makes it a suitable hub for rural air services and an important gateway to Sarawak. In 2014, Miri Airport was the sixth-busiest airport both in terms of aircraft movements and in terms of passengers handled, with 2,363,080 passenger movements and 49,204 aircraft movements.

Miri Airport is the second-largest airport in Sarawak after Kuching International Airport, with a terminal floor space of 16,448m². Miri Airport is not considered an international airport by the Civil Aviation Authority of Malaysia (CAAM) and Malaysia Airports Holdings Berhad (MAHB) despite having daily scheduled international flights.

== History ==
As the population of Miri Town grew, the need for a larger airport prompted the government to search for a new site to alleviate the traffic at Lutong Airport. A site to the southeast of the town center was selected. Construction began around 1960, and Miri Airport became fully operational after the early 1970s. The terminal and flight operations at the new Miri Airport commenced in 1985. Lutong Airport ceased operations by the 1990s, and it was decommissioned in the early 2000s.

== Facilities ==
Miri Airport is situated 9.5 km (5.9 mi) south-east of Miri's city centre and is ranked the sixth busiest domestic airport in Malaysia in terms of passenger and aircraft movement. The airport operates out of a single main terminal building which can accommodate up to 2 million passengers annually.

=== Airport terminal ===
The two-storey terminal building is able to handle up to 2 million passengers per annum. The terminal has been operating beyond its designed limits since 2012. There are a total of 15 check-in counters, of which six are Malaysia Airlines/MASwings check-in counters and four are for AirAsia. There are also Malaysia Airlines/MASwings and AirAsia self check-in kiosks, located near the side entrance of the airport. The terminal is equipped with a total of three conveyor belts in the baggage reclaim hall.

Several shops and dining outlets can be found in the airport, including Starbucks, Marrybrown and Famous Amos. Malaysia Airlines/MASwings and AirAsia each has a sales office in the airport. Malindo Air initially maintained its sales office on the first floor of the airport, just outside the departure hall, even though it has suspended flights to Miri from Kuala Lumpur indefinitely. A few months later, Malindo's sales office in Miri closed. July 1, 2016 witnessed the official resumption of Kuala Lumpur-Miri flight by Malindo. Barely a few months later, Malindo Air once again terminated its route from Miri to Kuala Lumpur in April 2017.

There are two aprons in the airport: Apron 'A' and Apron 'B'. The expansion of Apron 'B' was completed in 2014. The aprons underwent yet another expansion in 2015 and were completed on 3 March 2016. The expansion allows four additional parking bays for code C aircraft (i.e. Boeing 737 or Airbus A320 and equivalent) and six for ATR 72. All existing taxiways, gates and parking bays were renamed after the expansion and upgrades. The apron can now accommodate 7 code C aircraft, 1 Airbus A330 or Boeing 777, 9 ATR 72s and 4 Viking Air DHC-6-400 Twin Otters at any given time. Gates A1 - 3 in apron 'A' were renamed Gates 2 - 4 (parking bays 2 - 4), with a new addition of Gate 5 which consists of bays 5 - 8. All gates are for code C aircraft, except for Gate 4 which is optimised for widebody aircraft up to Airbus A330 & Boeing 777. Apron 'B' is restricted to ATR 72 aircraft or smaller (i.e. DHC-6 Twin Otter) and is primarily used by AirBorneo, except for parking bay 1 (formerly parking bay B1), which is used for code C aircraft. Gates B and C in apron 'B' were renamed to Gate 1 consisting of parking bays 1 and R1 - R13 (parking bays R1 - R3 were former parking bays B2 - B4, while bays R10 - R13 were initially bays C1 - C4). Parking bays R4 - R9 are new additional parking bays. For the comfort of passengers boarding and disembarking ATR 72s or DHC-6s, three-fingered piers with covered walkways were also constructed in apron 'B', based on the walkways found in low cost carrier terminal (LCCT) of Kuala Lumpur International Airport (KLIA) that is now closed.

=== Runway and taxiways ===
Miri International Airport is serviced by a 2,745 m × 60 m (9,006 ft × 197 ft) runway, designated Runway 02/20, and a partial, parallel taxiway at a width of 23 m (75 ft). Runway 20 is equipped with high intensity simple approach lights whereas Runway 02 has high-intensity Cat 1 precision approach lights installed. Other aids include ILS, DVOR/DME, NDB and PAPI (slope 3°). Taxiways A3, B1 and C1 that connects the runway, Apron 'A' and Apron 'B' with Taxiway A were finished after the 2016 expansion.

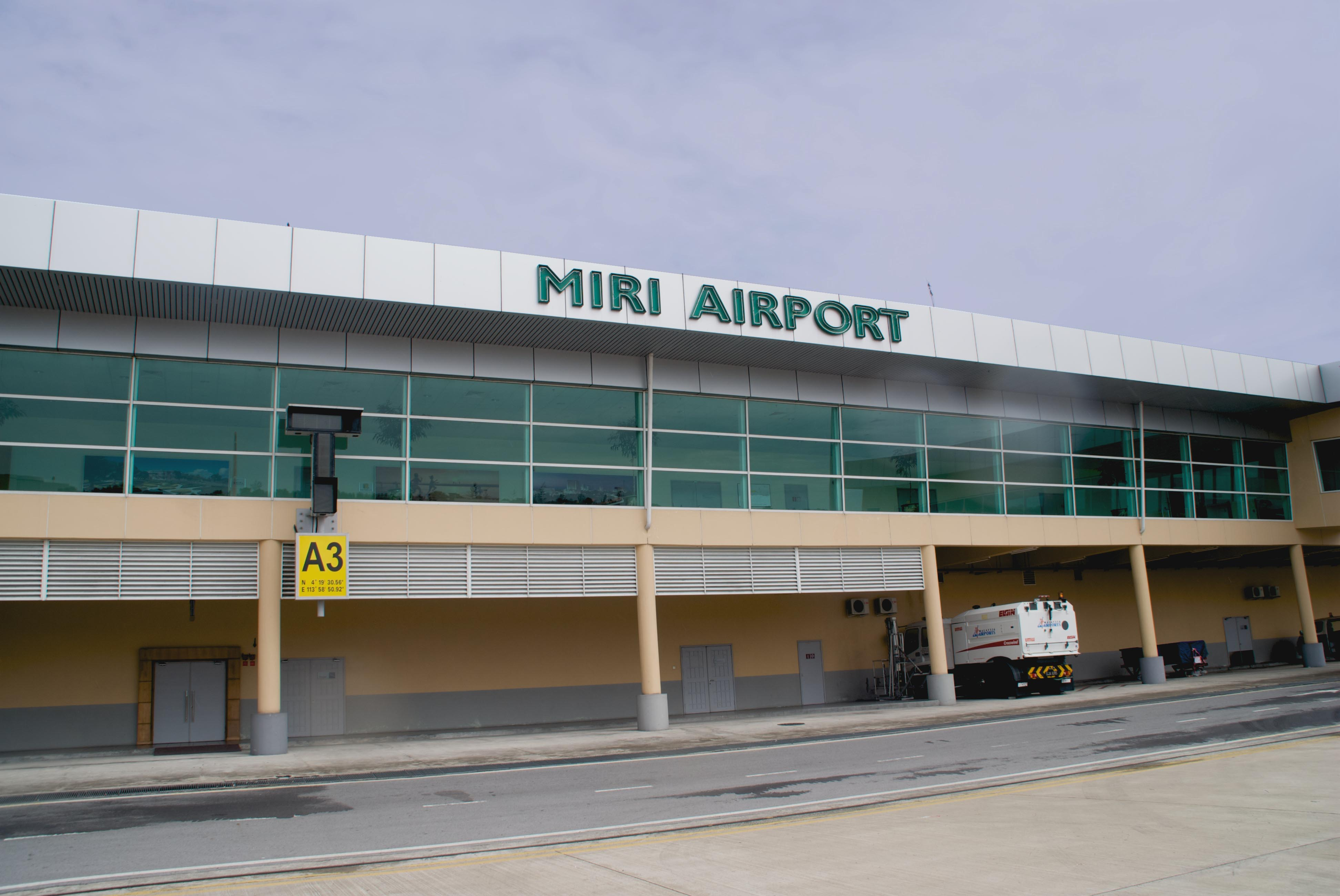
Airside view of Miri Airport

=== Hangars ===
There is a hangar for general aviation and a separate hangar now owned by HAS International Sdn Bhd 500 m from the terminal building. The general aviation apron GA2 is a small distance away from GA1 apron, which was completed in 2011. The HAS International hangar and GA2 were designed to accommodate 4 helicopters of up to the latest Airbus Helicopters H175 model. MASkargo and Gading Sari each maintains a hangar less than 50 m away from the terminal building.

=== Immigration ===
Sarawak maintains its own immigration autonomy. The exercised laws require all passengers travelling on any flights from outside Sarawak (including all flights from Peninsular Malaysia, the state of Sabah, Federal Territory of Labuan and other countries) to go through the immigration screening at the first entry of any Sarawakian airport.

Hornbill Skyways has a regional office at Miri Airport.

== Airlines and destinations ==
=== Passenger ===
Airlines	Destinations
AirAsia	Kota Kinabalu, Kuala Lumpur–International, Kuching
AirBorneo	Ba'kelalan, Bario, Bintulu, Labuan, Lawas, Limbang, Long Akah, Long Banga, Long Lellang, Long Seridan, Marudi, Mukah, Mulu, Sibu
Batik Air Malaysia	Kuala Lumpur–Subang (begins 1 December 2026)
Malaysia Airlines	Kuala Lumpur–International
Scoot	Singapore

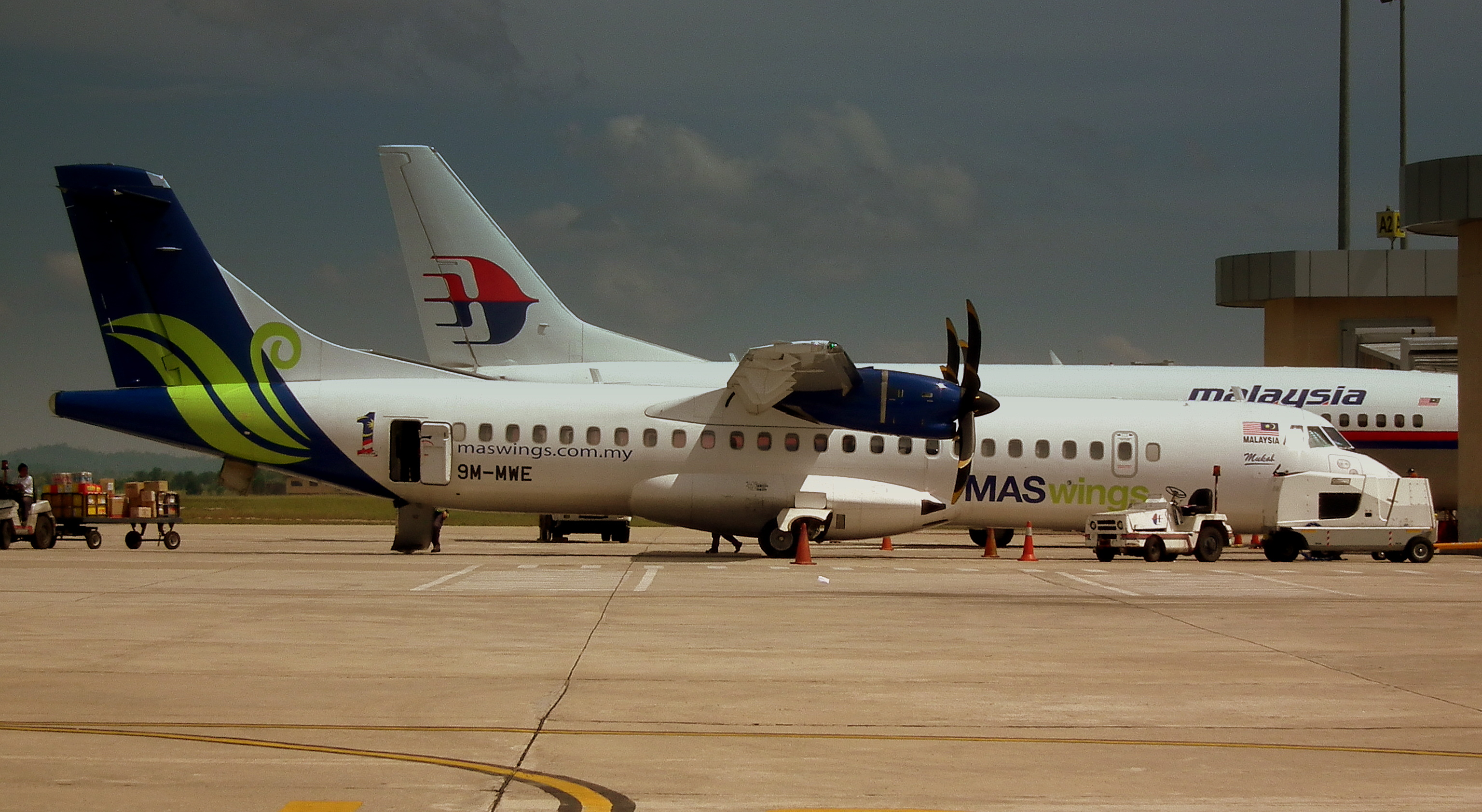
A MASwings ATR 72 parked next to a Malaysia Airlines Boeing 737

=== Cargo ===
Airlines	Destinations
World Cargo Airlines	Kota Kinabalu, Kuala Lumpur–International, Kuching

== Traffic and statistics ==
=== Traffic ===
Annual passenger numbers and aircraft statistics
Year	Passengers handled	Passenger % change	Cargo (metric tonnes)	Cargo % change	Aircraft movements	Aircraft % change
2003	1,377,312	Steady	3,881	Steady	43,460	Steady
2004	1,509,684	▲9.6	4,721	▲21.6	45,269	▲4.2
2005	1,594,855	▲5.6	5,392	▲14.2	42,865	▼5.3
2006	1,559,379	▼2.2	4,080	▼24.3	42,680	▼0.4
2007	1,454,167	▼6.7	3,564	▼12.6	35,502	▼16.8
2008	1,537,840	▲5.7	4,146	▲16.3	38,172	▲7.5
2009	1,620,345	▲5.4	3,921	▼5.4	41,996	▲10.0
2010	1,694,915	▲4.6	6,770	▲72.7	41,682	▼0.7
2011	1,856,626	▲9.5	8,198	▲21.1	43,707	▲4.9
2012	2,018,415	▲8.7	9,879	▲20.5	45,127	▲3.2
2013	2,223,172	▲10.1	9,800	▼0.8	47,585	▲5.4
2014	2,363,080	▲6.3	8,029	▼18.1	49,204	▲3.4
2015	2,249,206	▼4.8	7,292	▼9.2	47,733	▼3.0
2016	2,200,546	▼2.2	7,270	▼0.3	45,554	▼4.6
2017	2,188,048	▼0.6	4,872	▼33.0	40,692	▼0.7
2018	2,350,700	▲7.4	5,054	▲3.7	44,855	▲10.2
2019	2,439,492	▲3.8	5,278	▲4.4	43,752	▼2.5
2020	876,402	▼64.0	5,345	▲1.3	25,804	▼41.0
2021	509,367	▼41.9	7,679	▲43.7	21,429	▼20
2022	1,776,182	▲248.7	7,904	▲2.9	36,747	▲71.5
2023	2,201,131	▲23.9	5,519	▼30.2	38,571	▲5.0
2024	2,068,168	▼6.0	4,756	▼13.8	36,206	▼6.0
2025	2,273,670	▲9.9	3,456	▼27.3	37,630	▲3.9
	^{Source: Malaysia Airports Holdings Berhad}					

=== Statistics ===
Busiest domestic flights out of Miri Airport by frequency as of May 2026
Rank	Destinations	Frequency (weekly)	Airlines
1	Kuala Lumpur	46	AirAsia, Malaysia Airlines, Batik Air
2	Lawas, Sarawak	41	MASwings
3	Kuching, Sarawak	35	AirAsia
4	Labuan	32	MASwings
5	Sibu, Sarawak	24	MASwings
5	Bario, Sarawak	22	MASwings
7	Limbang, Sarawak	19	MASwings
8	Marudi, Sarawak	17	MASwings
9	Kota Kinabalu, Sabah	14	Airasia
9	Mulu, Sarawak	10	MASwings
11	Bintulu, Sarawak	7	MASwings
11	Mukah, Sarawak	7	MASwings
13	Long Banga, Sarawak	5	MASwings
14	Johor Bahru, Johor	3	AirAsia
15	Long Seridan, Sarawak	2	MASwings
15	Long Lellang, Sarawak	2	MASwings
17	Long Akah, Sarawak	1	MASwings

Busiest international flights out of Miri Airport by frequency as of October 2025
Rank	Destinations	Frequency (weekly)	Airlines
1	Singapore	4	Scoot

== Expansion and upgrades ==
The number of passengers visiting Miri has grown steadily over the years since the upgrading of the terminal. Calls to upgrade the gateway to northern Sarawak have been voiced as the airport slowly reaches its maximum capacity. On 6 December 2011, the Minister of Transport Datuk Abdul Rahim Bakri said that Miri Airport will be expanded further to cater for the growing volume of passengers and cargo passing through it. The expansion project would be implemented under the 11th Malaysia Plan following the increase in air passengers using the airport which was projected to reach two million within the next two years. The airport recorded an increase of 9.75 per cent in passenger traffic during the first nine months of 2011, with 1.35 million passengers using the airport compared with 1.23 million during the same period in the previous year. Cargo traffic also increased 18.69 per cent during the period under review from 4,849 metric tons to 5,756 metric tons. Miri Airport is the busiest domestic airport in Malaysia in terms of passenger and aircraft movement.

Prime Minister Datuk Seri Najib Tun Razak tabled the 2014 Budget in October 2013 and it was announced that Miri Airport would be among the five airports in the state and Sabah to be upgraded with a RM312 million allocation. The other airports were Sibu and Mukah Airports and Kota Kinabalu and Sandakan Airports. Lee also pointed out the need for the airport to have separate terminals catering to domestic and international and rural air services. This includes separate check-in counters and the departure and arrival lounges. The allocation is also said to improve passenger comfort at the airports.

Passenger traffic continued to grow in 2014. Appeals to upgrade the airport to cater for the growing numbers using Miri Airport were frequently voiced. Miri Airport handles more than 4,000 flights a month, with an average of 125 aircraft landings and take-offs daily, including 62 landings for rural services; with the current airport size, arrival times for incoming flights will be delayed because they have to wait for other aircraft to depart before being able to land on the runway. Traffic congestion during peak hours also poses a problem. An urgent meeting was held by Sarawak Communication Assistant Minister Datuk Lee Kim Shin regarding these matters. There are also talks to introduce more international routes into Miri to further boost the city's economy and to break the tourism bottleneck experienced in Miri as the only international route (Miri-Singapore) is inadequate at present.

On 15 December 2014, Lee announced that Miri Airport would be getting RM78 million for its extension work, including the extension of the current runway and the aircraft parking apron. Once the extension was completed, the parking apron would be able to accommodate 8 Boeing aircraft and equivalent, 9 ATR 72 and 4 DHC-6 Twin Otter. The extension project also included installing four additional aerobridges, constructing an additional runway, constructing rooftop walkways for domestic passengers and improving the drainage system. The design of the walkways will be based on the walkways found in the now-closed low cost carrier terminal (LCCT) at Kuala Lumpur International Airport (KLIA).

In 9 May 2026, Transport Minister Anthony Loke said the Economy Ministry has approved a RM445 million allocation to upgrade the Miri Airport terminal building under Rolling Plan 1 of the 13th Malaysia Plan in April 2026 following a value assessment review session held on March 17. The upgrading works will increase its handling capacity from 2 million passengers to 4 million passengers annually. Work proposed under this project involves expansion of the existing terminal building from 16,900 square metres to 25,000 square metres, a separated rural air services area, new check-in counters, more vehiclesn parking space, new baggage handling system, dedicated bays for tourist buses and e-hailing services, pier expansion and six additional passenger boarding bridges.

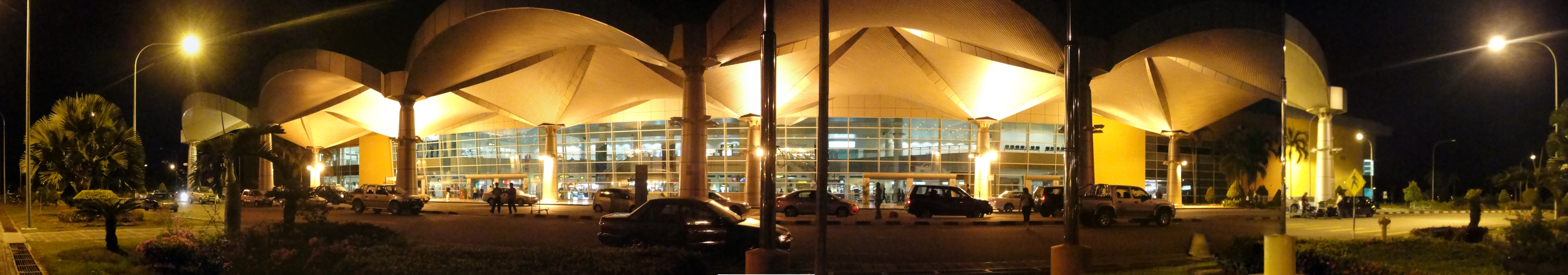
Miri Airport at night

== Incidents ==
- On 6 September 1997, Royal Brunei Airlines Flight 839 crashed short of the runway at Miri Airport. All 10 persons on board were killed.
