= Bario Airport =

Airport in Bario, Sarawak, Malaysia

Bario Airport Lapangan Terbang Bario
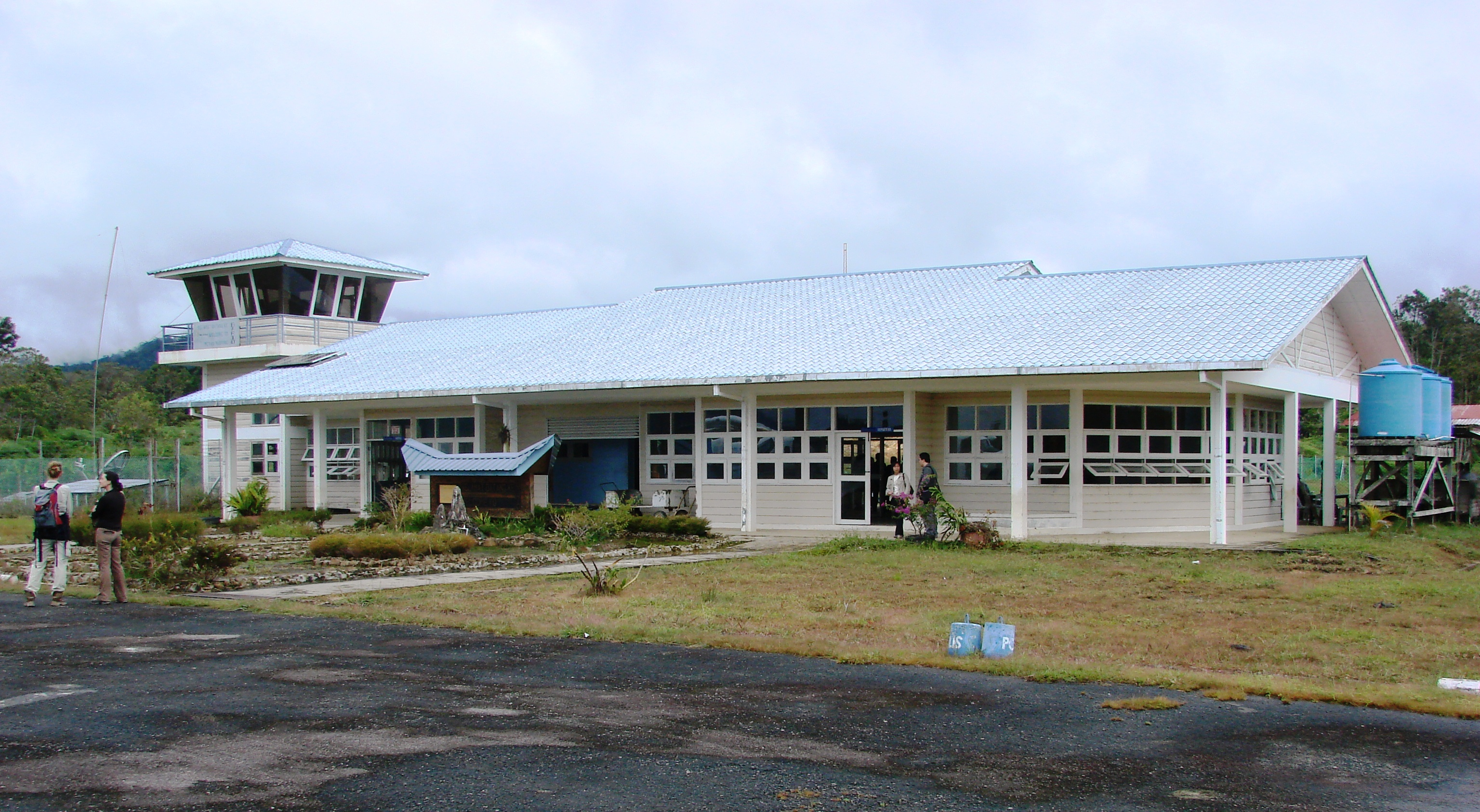
- IATA: BBN; ICAO: WBGZ

Summary
- Airport type: Public
- Operator: Malaysia Airports Holdings Berhad
- Serves: Bario, Sarawak, Malaysia
- Time zone: MST (UTC+08:00)
- Elevation AMSL: 3,450 ft / 1,052 m
- Coordinates: 03°44′13″N 115°28′10″E

Map
- Location in Sarawak, East Malaysia, Malaysia BBN/WMGZ (East Malaysia) BBN/WMGZ (Malaysia) BBN/WMGZ (Southeast Asia) BBN/WMGZ (Asia)

Runways
Direction	Length		Surface
Direction	m	ft	Surface
11/29	670	2,198	Bitumen

Statistics (2015)
- Passenger: 22,084 (▲19.7%)
- Airfreight (Tonnes): 79 (▼23.3%)
- Aircraft movements: 2,228 (▲26.4%)
- Source: official web site AIP Malaysia

Bario Airport (IATA: BBN, ICAO: WBGZ) is an airport in Bario, a town in the state of Sarawak in Malaysia.

== Airlines and destinations ==
Airlines	Destinations
AirBorneo	Ba'kelalan, Long Banga, Long Lellang, Long Seridan, Marudi, Miri

== See also ==
- List of airports in Malaysia
