= Long Seridan =

- Location within Borneo
- Coordinates: 3.98333°N 115.06667°E
- Country: Malaysia
- State: Sarawak
- Administrative Division: Miri
- Elevation: 443 m (1,453 ft)

Long Seridan is a Kelabit settlement in the Miri division of Sarawak, Malaysia. It lies approximately 590 kilometres (367 mi) east-north-east of the state capital Kuching.

Long Seridan Airport has a STOL runway, originally built by Gurkha engineers in 1963. There are several homestays where tourists can stay and enjoy the local jungle trekking, fishing and visiting Penan settlements.

Neighbouring settlements include:

- Buyo 20.7 kilometres (12.9 mi) southeast
- Long Napir 21.7 kilometres (13.5 mi) north
- Rumah Unar 24.7 kilometres (15.3 mi) north
- Rumah Sigarsei 25.2 kilometres (15.7 mi) north
- Kubaan 35.4 kilometres (22.0 mi) southeast
- Pa Tik 39.4 kilometres (24.5 mi) southeast
- Rumah Danau 39.6 kilometres (24.6 mi) north
- Rumah Ambau 40.7 kilometres (25.3 mi) northwest
- Rumah Haling 40.7 kilometres (25.3 mi) northwest
- Rumah Sungai Medalam 41.5 kilometres (25.8 mi) northwest
