= Malaysia Airports =

Malaysian airport management company

Malaysia Airports Holdings Berhad
- Company type: Publicly traded state-owned enterprise
- Traded as: MYX: 5014
- ISIN: MYL5014OO005
- Industry: Airport management
- Founded: 1991; 35 years ago
- Founder: Government of Malaysia
- Headquarters: Kuala Lumpur International Airport, Sepang, Malaysia
- Key people: Dr. Nungsari Ahmad Radhi (Chairman); Dato’ Mohd Izani Ghani (Managing Director); Bryan Thompson (CAO)
- Revenue: RM 3,870 million
- Operating income: RM 777.3 million
- Net income: RM 40.1 million
- Number of employees: 10,000
- Parent: Khazanah Nasional
- Website: www.malaysiaairports.com.my

Malaysia Airports Holdings Berhad (MYX: 5014) is a Malaysian airport management company. Established in 1991, the company manages most of the airports in Malaysia. The firm was recently awarded the duty to manage airports in international destinations. It has its headquarters in the Malaysia Airports Corporate Office in the Persiaran Korporat KLIA in Kuala Lumpur International Airport (KLIA), Sepang, Selangor.

== History ==
Malaysia Airports Berhad was incorporated in 1991 when the Malaysian Parliament passed a bill to separate the Department of Civil Aviation (DCA) into two entities with different spheres of responsibilities. The DCA remains the regulatory body for the airports and aviation industry in Malaysia, whilst Malaysia Airports Berhad focuses on the operation, management, and maintenance of airports. In November 1992, Malaysia Airports was duly licensed by the Minister of Transport Malaysia to carry out its function as the airport operator.

The holding company, Malaysia Airports Holdings Berhad (MAHB) was incorporated as a public limited company in November 1999 and was thereafter listed on the Main Board of the Kuala Lumpur Stock Exchange, becoming the first airport operating company to be listed in Asia and the sixth in the world. The company is listed on the Malaysian Stock Exchange (Bursa Malaysia).

The main airport the company manages is the KL International Airport (KLIA). KLIA is the result of a visionary strategy to meet the needs of new large aircraft and the traffic demand of the 21st century. KLIA has pioneered the use of state-of-the-art technology in airport management known as Total Airport Management Systems (TAMS). TAMS, managed by Malaysia Airport (Technologies) Sdn. Bhd. consists of more than 40 systems and airport functions including air traffic management, baggage handling, passenger check-in, and flight information display.

MAHB's present corporate structure includes several operating subsidiaries; Malaysia Airports Sdn. Bhd. (MASB), Malaysia Airports (Sepang) Sdn. Bhd., Malaysia Airports (Niaga) Sdn. Bhd., Malaysia Airports Technologies Sdn. Bhd., Malaysia Airports (Properties) Sdn. Bhd., K.L. Airport Hotel Sdn. Bhd., MAB Agriculture-Horticulture Sdn. Bhd, Malaysia Airports Consultancy Services Sdn. Bhd., Malaysia International Aerospace Centre (MIAC) Sdn Bhd., and Urusan Teknologi Wawasan Sdn. Bhd. The group has a total staff of over 10,000 deployed across 39 offices nationwide.

MAHB has acquired Sabiha Gocken International Airport in Istanbul, Turkey. MAHB also previously provided airport management services for the Angkor International Airport, Hyderabad International Airport India, Delhi International Airport India, Maldives International Airport and Phnom Penh International Airport in Cambodia through a joint-venture arrangement with Aéroports de Paris Management S.A.

Malaysia Airports' Training Centres (MATCs) are located near Kuala Lumpur International Airport and Penang International Airport. They were established to cater to the training needs of all Malaysia Airports personnel. The MATCs have also been used for security related programs conducted by International Civil Aviation Organisation (ICAO). In addition, the MATCs provide expertise on aviation security and safety matters to the Malaysian government and airlines.

== List of subsidiaries ==
Company logo	Company name	Date of establishment	Operator/Services
	KL Airport Hotel Sdn. Bhd.	16 January 1995	Owns and operates Sama Sama Hotel KL International Airport, a 5-star hotel at KLIA
	MAB Agriculture-Horticulture Sdn. Bhd. (MAAH)	1998	Cultivating and managing the plantations of oil palm, coconut and other agriculture products around KLIA
	Malaysia Airports Sdn. Bhd.		the operator of all airports in Malaysia except Kuala Lumpur International Airport (KLIA)
	MA Consultancy Services Sdn. Bhd. (MACS)	1994	Offers management, maintenance and technical services in airport operation, development and services
	MA Technologies Sdn Bhd.		
	Malaysia Airports (Niaga) Sdn. Bhd.		the duty-free operator of Eraman Duty Free
	MA Properties Sdn. Bhd.		
	Malaysia Airports (Sepang) Sdn. Bhd.		the operator of the Kuala Lumpur International Airport (KLIA)
	Urusan Teknologi Wawasan Sdn. Bhd. (UTW)		
	Malaysia International Aerospace Centre Sdn. Bhd. (MIAC)		

== Airports managed ==
The company manages 39 airports in Malaysia and 1 in Istanbul. Among them are:

Managed airports in Malaysia:
- Malacca International Airport
- Bakelalan Airport
- Bintulu Airport
- Kota Kinabalu International Airport
- Kuala Lumpur International Airport
- Kuching International Airport
- Labuan International Airport
- Lahad Datu Airport
- Langkawi International Airport
- Long Pasia Airport
- Bario Airport
- Limbang Airport
- Miri Airport
- Penang International Airport
- Sandakan Airport
- Sibu Airport
- Sultan Abdul Halim Airport
- Sultan Haji Ahmad Shah Airport
- Sultan Azlan Shah Airport
- Sultan Ismail Petra Airport
- Sultan Mahmud Airport
- Tawau Airport
- Tioman Airport

Managed airports in Turkey:

- Sabiha Gokcen Airport

== Awards ==
- Chartered Institute of Logistics and Transport Malaysia – Company of the Year 2007

== See also ==
- List of airports in Malaysia
