= Senai (disambiguation) =

Senai a town in Kulai District, Johor, Malaysia.

Senai may also refer to:

- SENAI (Serviço Nacional de Aprendizagem Industrial), a Brazilian network of secondary schools
- MV Senai, later Empire Seabreeze, a ship
- Senai International Airport, Malaysia
- Senai (federal constituency), in Malaysia
- Senai (state constituency), in Malaysia

== See also ==
- Sinai (disambiguation)
