= Siani =

Siani may refer to:

- Siani (surname), an Italian surname
- Sayani, a village in Chabahar County, Sistan and Baluchestan Province, Iran
- Siani Lee (1962–2001), American television news anchor
- Swedish International Agricultural Network Initiative

== See also ==
- Saini, a caste of North India
- Sinai (disambiguation)
