= JHB =

JHB may refer to:

- Jaime Herrera Beutler, American politician
- Johannesburg, South Africa
- Senai International Airport, Johor, Malaysia, IATA code JHB
