= Jalan Bandar Sibu =

Road in Malaysia

Federal Route 3105
- Jalan Bandar Sibu

Route information
- Maintained by Malaysian Public Works Department
- Length: 4 km (2.5 mi)

Major junctions
- West end: Sibu (North)
- FT 3104 Federal route 3104; FT 1 AH150 Pan Borneo Highway
- East end: Keranji

Location
- Country: Malaysia
- Primary destinations: Sungai Merah; Sibu Airport; Sibu city Kampung Jeriah

Highway system
- Highways in Malaysia; Expressways; Federal; State

Jalan Bandar Sibu, or Jalan Oya and Jalan Tunku Abdul Rahman, Federal Route 33, is a federal road in Sibu Division, Sarawak, Malaysia. It is also a main route to Sibu city from Pan Borneo Highway.

An upgrade of the route to Sibu Airport is proposed.

== List of junctions ==
Km	Exit	Junctions	To	Remarks
		Keranji; Bulatan Keranji	Northeast; FT 1 AH150 Jenagor; FT 1 AH150 Mukah; FT 1 AH150 Bintulu Southeast; FT 1 AH150 Sibu Jaya; FT 1 AH150 Kanowit; FT 1 AH150 Julau; FT 1 AH150 Sarikei; FT 1 AH150 Saratok	Roundabout
		Kampung Jeriah		
		Sibu	Southwest; Jalan Wong King Hou; Sibu city centre Sibu civic centre Sibu Division Mosque; Tua Pek Kong Temple; Sibu jetty	T-junctions
		Sibu; Bulatan Deshon	North; Jalan Leng Ka Cheng South; Jalan Seduan; Taman Seduan 8 Sibu city centre	Roundabout
		Sibu; Bulatan Brooke	Southwest; Persiaran Brooke; Sibu city centre Sibu civic centre Sibu Division Mosque; Tua Pek Kong Temple; Sibu jetty	Roundabout
		Kampung Nangka	Southwest; Jalan Tun Abang Haji Openg; Sibu city centre Sibu civic centre Sibu Division Mosque; Tua Pek Kong Temple; Sibu jetty	Roundabout
		Sibu Airport	Sibu Airport; Arrival/Departure	
		Sungai Merah		
