= Mount Sinai Hospital =

Mount Sinai Hospital or Mount Sinai Medical Center may refer to:

== Canada ==
- Mount Sinai Hospital Montreal, affiliated with McGill Faculty of Medicine and Health Sciences, Quebec
- Mount Sinai Hospital (Toronto), Ontario

== United States ==
- Mount Sinai Hospital (Manhattan), New York, formerly and for many years part of Mount Sinai Medical Center, New York
- Mount Sinai Hospital (Cleveland), Ohio
- Mount Sinai Hospital (Hartford), Connecticut
- Mount Sinai Hospital (Minneapolis), Minnesota
- Mount Sinai Hospital (Philadelphia, Pennsylvania)
- Mount Sinai Medical Center (Miami), Miami Beach, Florida
- Mount Sinai Hospital (Chicago), formerly and briefly called Mount Sinai Medical Center, Illinois

== See also ==
- Sinai (disambiguation)
- Mount Sinai (disambiguation)
- Sinai Hospital (disambiguation)
- Sinai Chicago, a hospital network in Chicago, Illinois, U.S.
- Mount Sinai Health System, a hospital network in New York City, New York State, U.S.
  - Icahn School of Medicine at Mount Sinai, formerly Mount Sinai School of Medicine
  - Mount Sinai Phillips School of Nursing, originally Beth Israel School of Nursing
  - Mount Sinai Morningside, originally St. Luke's Hospital
  - Mount Sinai West, originally Roosevelt Hospital
  - Mount Sinai Hospital (Brooklyn), originally Kings Highway Hospital
  - Mount Sinai Hospital Queens, once Astoria General Hospital
  - Mount Sinai South Nassau, originally South Nassau Communities Hospital
  - Mount Sinai Valley Health System, New Jersey, affiliated with The Valley Hospital
- Mount Sinai Journal of Medicine
- Jewish Hospital (disambiguation)
