= List of the busiest airports in Malaysia =

List of Malaysian airports

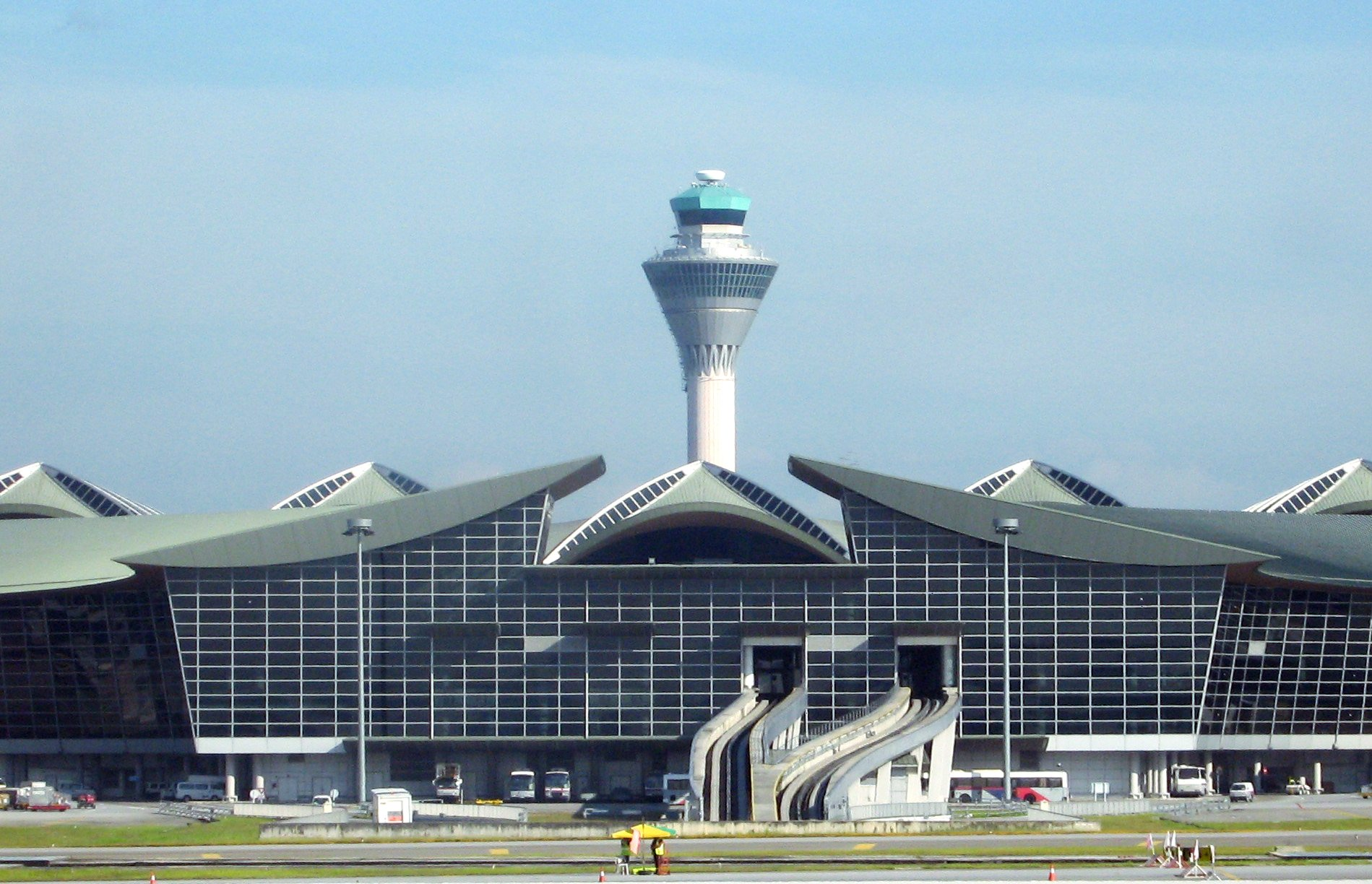
Kuala Lumpur International Airport is the 13th busiest airport in the world by international passenger traffic.

The busiest airports in Malaysia are measured according to data presented by Malaysia Airports Holdings Berhad. Among all top 20 busiest airports, the Kuala Lumpur International Airport (KLIA) is the only airport which can land the A380. KLIA also has the longest runway in Malaysia, with 1 4,124 and 2 4,000 m runways.

== Passenger traffic ==
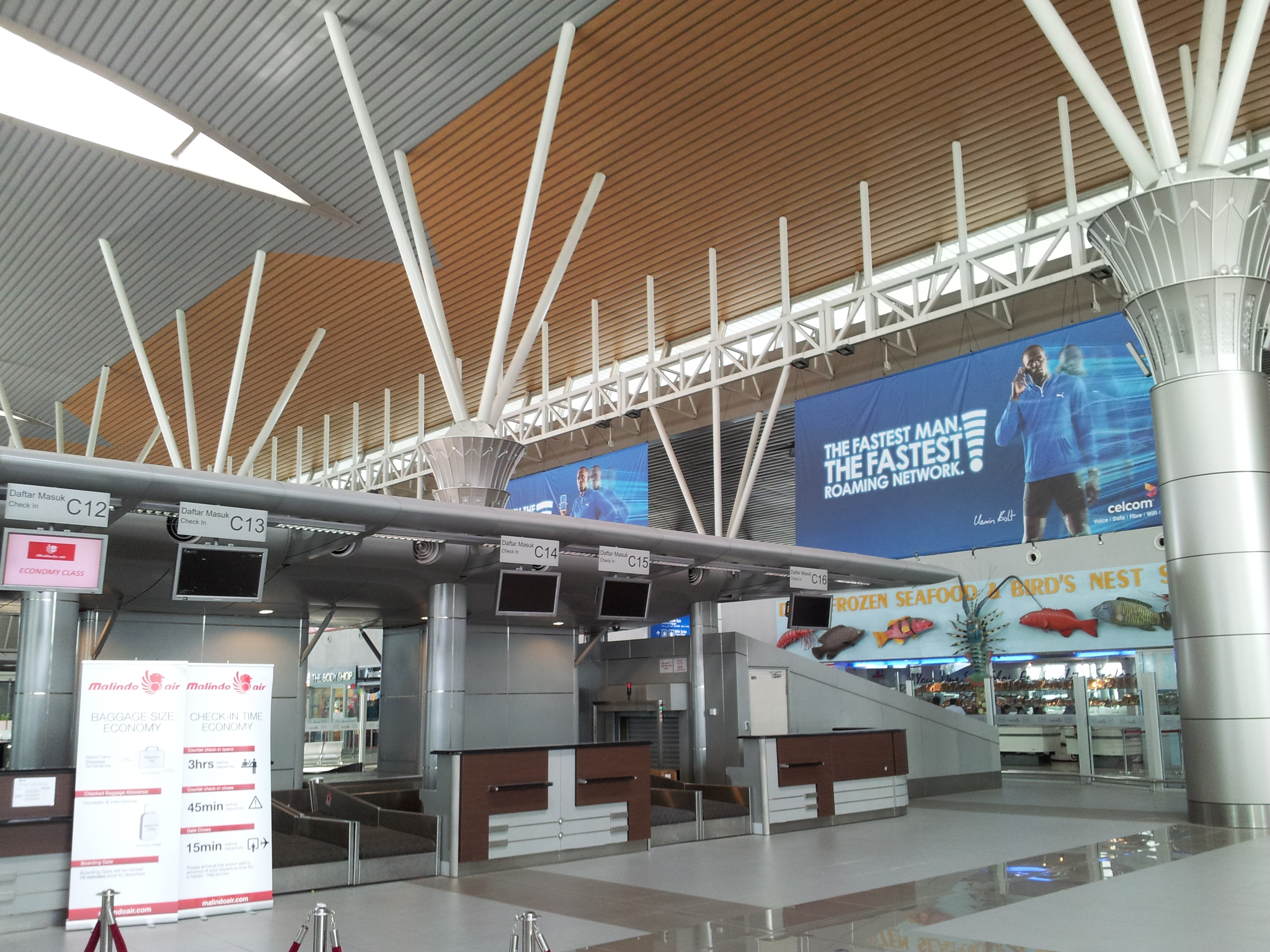
Kota Kinabalu International Airport is the country's second busiest airport and East Malaysia's most important air hub.

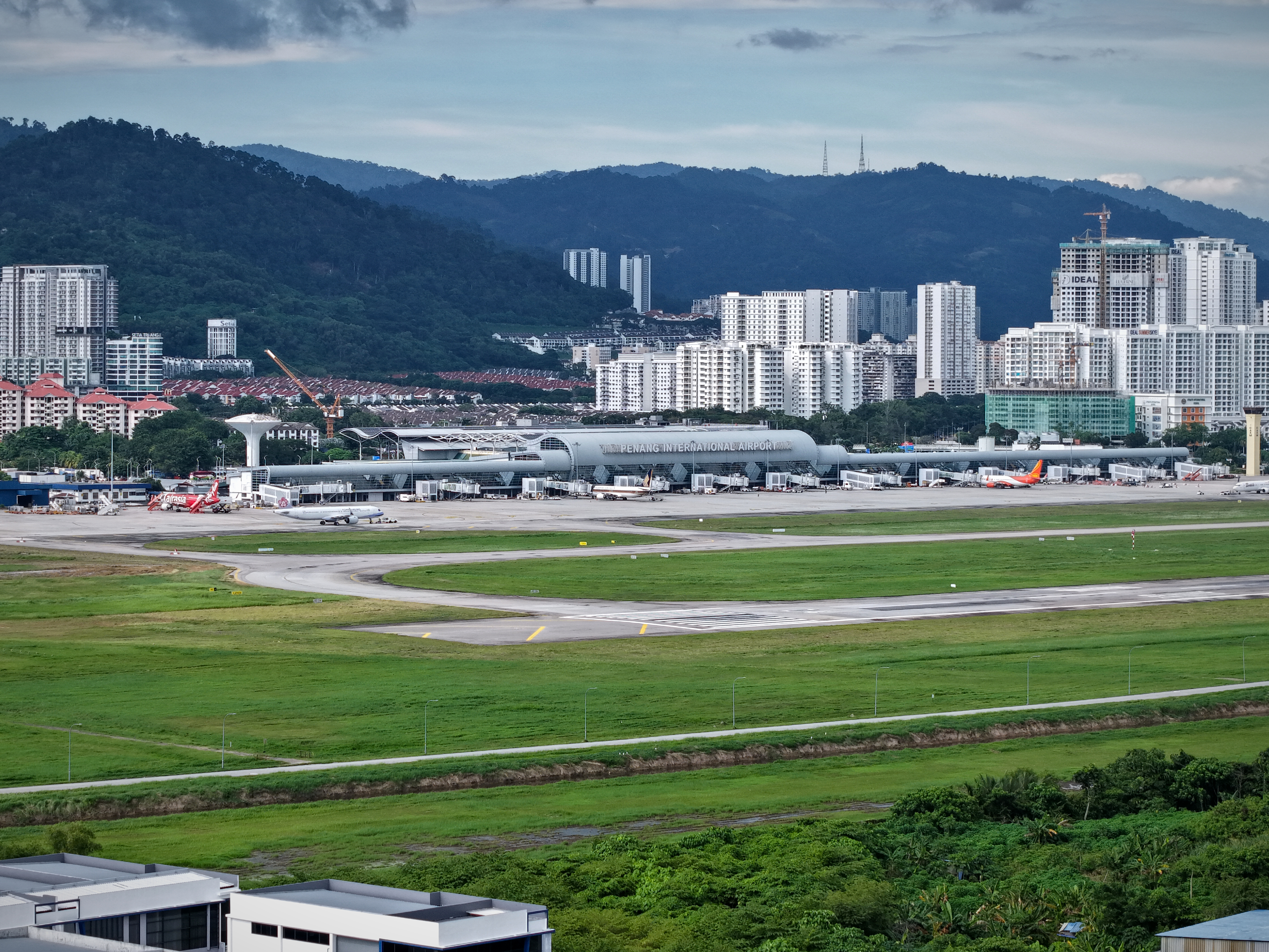
The Penang International Airport, currently Malaysia's third busiest airport, serves the city of George Town.

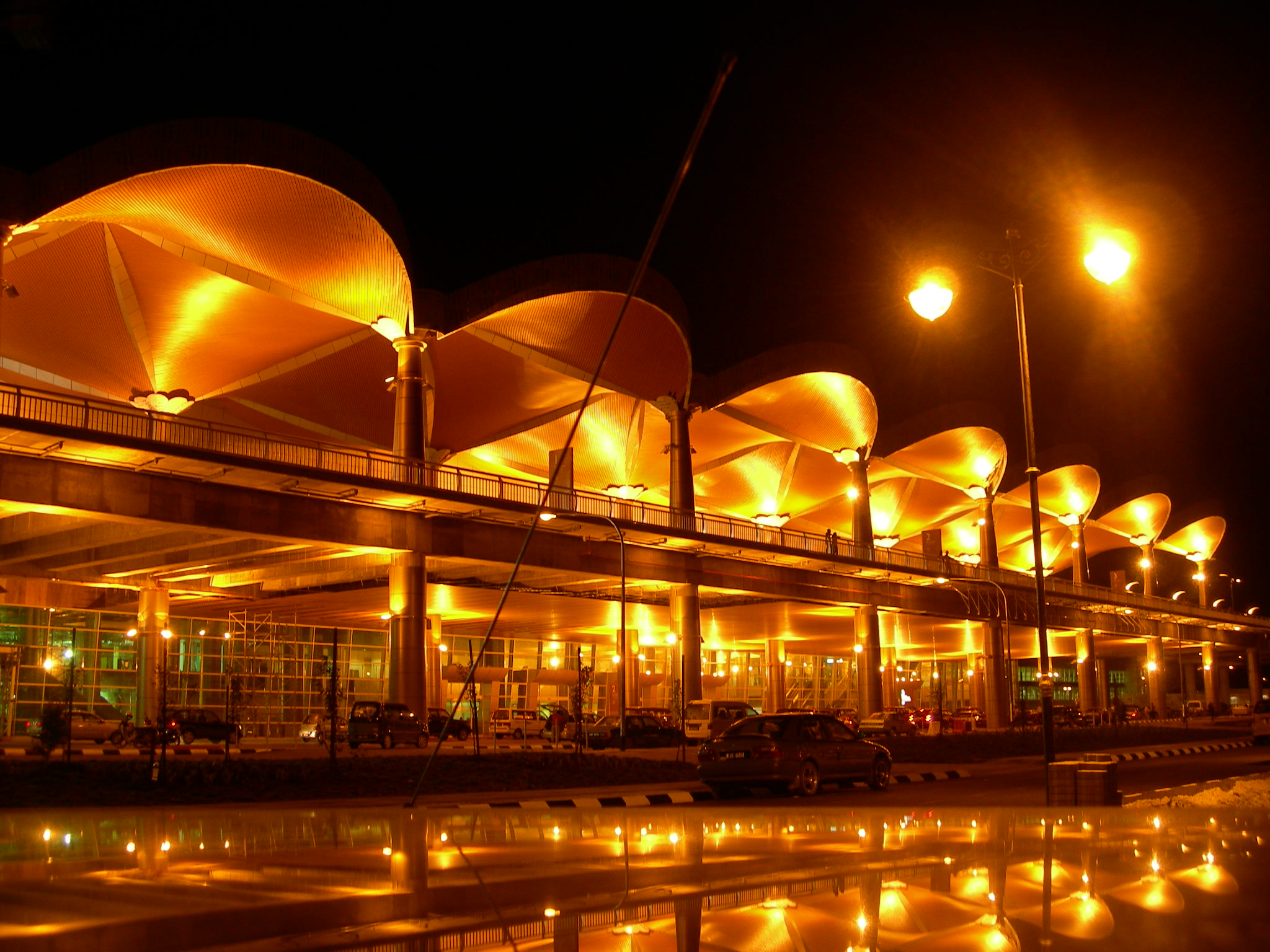
Kuching International Airport at night

A passenger is described as a person who departs, arrives or passes in condition of transit through any airport located between the borders of Malaysia at any point of time during a year. The data presented here includes the total number of departure, arrival and transit passengers for the years selected, and for both domestic and international flights arriving in scheduled and non-scheduled services.

Airport name	State	City served	IATA	ICAO	2018	2019	2020	2021	2022	2023	2024
Kuala Lumpur International Airport	Selangor	Greater Kuala Lumpur	KUL	WMKK	59,988,409	62,257,101	13,120,116	4,011,838	25,399,296	47,224,000	57,008,869
Kota Kinabalu International Airport	Sabah	Kota Kinabalu	BKI	WBKK	8,622,488	9,443,275	2,300,884	1,123,575	5,022,756	7,035,170	7,954,338
Penang International Airport	Penang	George Town	PEN	WMKP	7,790,423	8,316,050	1,814,266	543,519	4,275,123	6,781,059	7,641,625
Kuching International Airport	Sarawak	Kuching	KCH	WBGG	5,564,722	5,947,478	1,778,519	840,553	4,340,070	5,327,787	5,383,947
Senai International Airport	Johor	Johor Bahru	JHB	WMKJ	3,522,576	4,270,144	1,096,330	371,154	2,216,136	3,010,018	3,360,906
Langkawi International Airport	Kedah	Langkawi	LGK	WMKL	2,735,703	2,945,963	966,789	762,142	2,240,416	2,501,717	2,547,358
Miri Airport	Sarawak	Miri	MYY	WBGR	2,350,700	2,435,493	874,661	509,367	1,775,238	2,195,063	2,066,969
Tawau Airport	Sabah	Tawau	TWU	WBKW	1,642,171	1,832,368	571,800	415,977	1,377,644	1,710,472	1,961,577
Sultan Ismail Petra Airport	Kelantan	Kota Bharu	KBR	WMKC	1,688,625	1,789,516	711,285	501,930	1,384,903	1,581,759	1,473,065
Sibu Airport	Sarawak	Sibu	SBW	WBGS	1,579,528	1,750,876	569,625	243,350	1,233,824	1,548,423	1,459,036
Sultan Abdul Aziz Shah Airport	Selangor	Kuala Lumpur	SZB	WMSA	1,964,059	2,259,587	949,508	577,984	1,547,253	1,376,030	1,422,334
Sandakan Airport	Sabah	Sandakan	SDK	WMKS	950,861	1,083,090	361,955	245,244	793,536	-	980,342
Bintulu Airport	Sarawak	Bintulu	BTU	WBGB	923,033	1,114,326	369,802	166,236	-	-	850,088
Sultan Mahmud Airport	Terengganu	Kuala Terengganu	TGG	WMKN	894,737	910,801	300,945	165,649	-	-	651,572
Sultan Abdul Halim Airport	Kedah	Alor Setar	AOR	WMKA	817,253	919,887	275,742	165,678	-	-	546,916

== Cargo traffic ==
The following is a list of 10 busiest airports in Malaysia in terms of cargo handling traffic. The cargo numbers are in metric tonnes.

Airport name	State	City served	IATA	ICAO	2012 (tonnes)	2013 (tonnes)
Kuala Lumpur International Airport	Selangor	Kuala Lumpur	KUL	WMKK	673,107	680,983
Penang International Airport	Penang	George Town	PEN	WMKP	123,246	153,703
Subang Airport	Selangor	Kuala Lumpur	SZB	WMSA	22,680	26,443
Kuching International Airport	Sarawak	Kuching	KCH	WBGG	15,810	21,993
Kota Kinabalu International Airport	Sabah	Kota Kinabalu	BKI	WBKK	23,563	21,922
Miri Airport	Sarawak	Miri	MYY	WBGR	9,879	9,800
Labuan Airport	Wilayah Persekutuan	Labuan	LBU	WBKL	6,071	9,329
Senai International Airport	Johor	Johor Bahru	JHB	WMKJ	3,149	3,443
Sandakan Airport	Sabah	Sandakan	SDK	WBKS	2,479	2,894
Tawau Airport	Sabah	Tawau	TWU	WBKW	2,489	2,844

== Aircraft movements ==
The following is a list of the 10 busiest airports in Malaysia in terms of commercial aircraft movements (take-off and landing).

Airport name	State	City served	IATA	ICAO	2019	2020	2021	2022	2023
Kuala Lumpur International Airport	Selangor	Kuala Lumpur	KUL	WMKK	407,315	124,529	73,673	198,302	319,054
Penang International Airport	Penang	George Town	PEN	WMKP	78,400	28,497	15,978	46,257	59,578
Kota Kinabalu International Airport	Sabah	Kota Kinabalu	BKI	WBKK	82,125	29,214	21,126	49,876	58,323
Kuching International Airport	Sarawak	Kuching	KCH	WBGG	53,610	25,069	18,308	42,126	45,781
Senai International Airport	Johor	Johor Bahru	JHB	WMKJ	58,313	21,481	8,988	33,098	42,029
Miri Airport	Sarawak	Miri	MYY	WBGR	42,076	24,902	20,326	35,225	37,366
Subang Airport	Selangor	Kuala Lumpur	SZB	WMSA	52,082	29,091	22,352	43,110	33,725
Langkawi International Airport	Kedah	Langkawi	LGK	WMKL	25,673	10,385	7,483	20,673	19,374
Sultan Ismail Petra Airport	Kelantan	Kota Bharu	KBR	WMKC	24,514	13,117	9,527	19,027	18,403
Sibu Airport	Sarawak	Sibu	SBW	WBGS	16,753	7,120	3,538	12,002	13,608
^{Source: Malaysia Airports Holdings Berhad, Ministry of Transport}

== Busiest air routes ==
As of 2023, the busiest domestic route in Malaysia is the Kuala Lumpur - Kota Kinabalu - Kuala Lumpur sector, with over 160 flights weekly. The busiest international route from Malaysia is Kuala Lumpur - Singapore - Kuala Lumpur sector with over 255 flights weekly. In addition, the busiest non-Kuala Lumpur based domestic route is Kota Kinabalu - Tawau - Kota Kinabalu sector with more than 50 flights weekly.
