= Tanjung Manis Airport =

Tanjung Manis Airport Lapangan Terbang Tanjung Manis
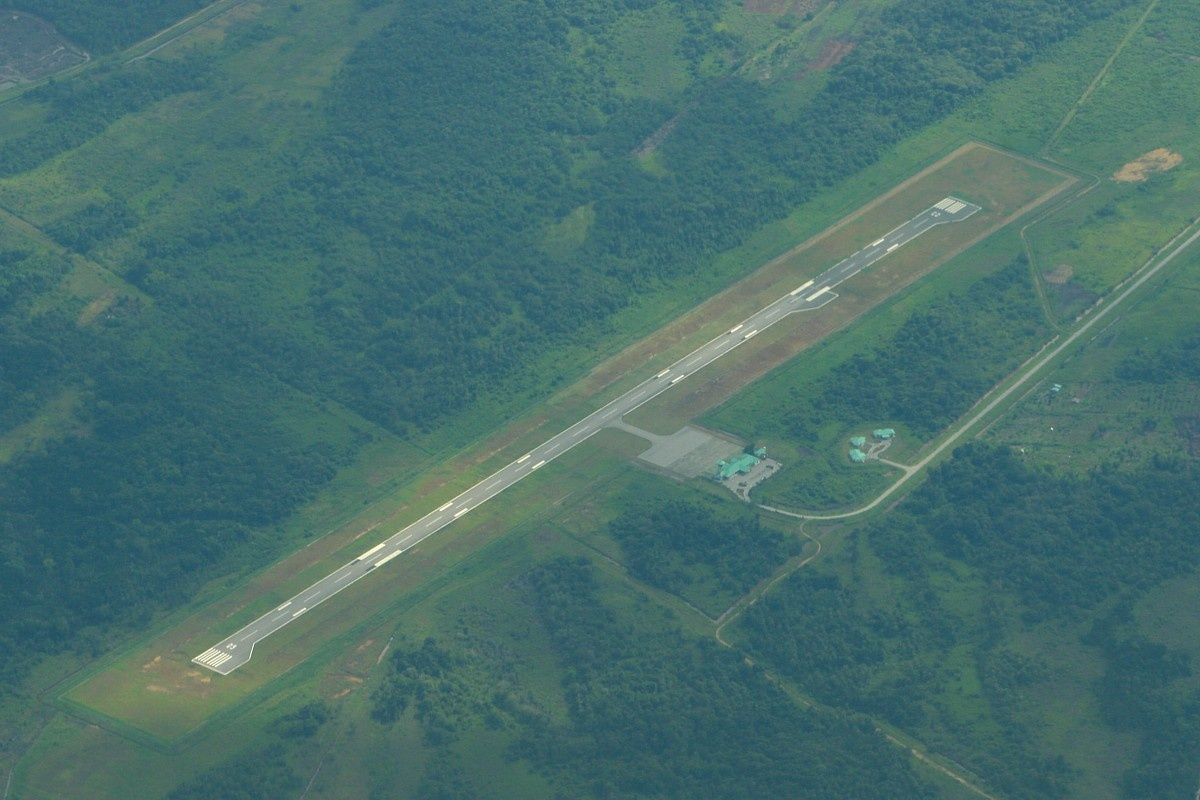
- IATA: TGC; ICAO: WBTM

Summary
- Airport type: Public
- Operator: Sarawak Timber Industry Development Corporation
- Serves: Tanjung Manis, Mukah and Sarikei, Sarawak
- Location: Tanjung Manis, Mukah, Sarawak, Malaysia
- Time zone: MST (UTC+08:00)
- Elevation AMSL: 15 ft (4.6 m)
- Coordinates: 02°10′40″N 111°12′07″E

Map
- Location in East Malaysia

Runways
Direction	Length		Surface
Direction	m	ft	Surface
05/23	1,500	4,921	Bitumen
- Source: AIP Malaysia

Tanjung Manis Airport (Malay: Lapangan Terbang Tanjung Manis) (IATA: TGC, ICAO: WBTM) is an airport located in Mukah Division, Sarawak, Malaysia. Although Tanjung Manis is now under the jurisdiction of Mukah Division, due to its close proximity to Sarikei, the airport also serves the Sarikei Division as well.

== Background ==
The 101-hectare Tanjung Manis Airport was opened in 2001 to facilitate the management of logistics for the investors of Tanjung Manis Economic Growth Area (T-MEGA), formerly known as Tanjung Manis halal hub. The short take-off and landing airport is certified as a category 2B airport with a minimum field length needed for take-off of between 800 m-1,200 m and suitable for aircraft wingspan of between 15 m-24 m.

== Airlines and destinations ==
Airlines	Destinations
AirBorneo	Kuching, Mukah
