= Beth Israel Hospital =

Beth Israel Hospital may refer to:

- Beth Israel Deaconess Medical Center in Boston, including the former Beth Israel Hospital
- Mount Sinai Beth Israel, including the former Beth Israel Medical Center, in Manhattan, New York (closed 2025)
- Newark Beth Israel Medical Center in Newark, New Jersey

== See also ==
- Beth Israel (disambiguation)
- Jewish Hospital (disambiguation)
