= Mount Sinai (disambiguation) =

Mount Sinai is a mountain in the Sinai Peninsula of Egypt.

Mount Sinai may also refer to:

- Mount Sinai (Bible), where, according to the Bible, God gave Moses the Ten Commandments, often identified with the above mountain in Egypt

== Places ==
- Mount Sinai, Indiana, U.S.
- Mount Sinai, New York, U.S.

== Other uses ==
- Mount Sinai Medical Center & Miami Heart Institute, Miami, Florida, U.S.
- Mount Sinai Memorial Park (Toronto), Canada
- Mount Sinai Memorial Park Cemetery, Los Angeles, California U.S.
- Mount Sinai Jewish Center, New York City, New York, U.S.
- Mount Sinai School, Alabama, U.S.
- Mount Sinai Health System, hospital network in New York City, New York, U.S.
  - Icahn School of Medicine at Mount Sinai
  - Mount Sinai Phillips School of Nursing
  - Mount Sinai Hospital (Manhattan)
  - Mount Sinai Kravis Children's Hospital
  - Mount Sinai Beth Israel
  - Mount Sinai Morningside
  - Mount Sinai West
  - Mount Sinai South Nassau
  - New York Eye and Ear Infirmary of Mount Sinai
- Mount Sinai Temple (Sioux City, Iowa), U.S.

== See also ==
- Jebel Musa (disambiguation), Arabic name of the mountain
- Mount Sinai Cemetery (disambiguation), several cemeteries
- Mount Sinai Hospital (disambiguation), several hospitals
- Har Sinai – Oheb Shalom Congregation
- Temple Sinai (disambiguation)
- Sinai (disambiguation)
- Horeb (disambiguation)
