= Jewish Hospital =

Jewish Hospital may refer to:

- Barnes-Jewish Hospital, (St. Louis, MO, USA)
- Galilee Community General Jewish Hospital of Uganda, (Kampala, Uganda)
- Jewish General Hospital, (Montreal, QC, Canada)
- Jewish Rehabilitation Hospital, (Laval, QC, Canada)
- The Jewish Hospital – Mercy Health, (Cincinnati, OH, USA)
- Jewish Hospital in Hamburg, (Hamburg, Germany)
- Kingsbrook Jewish Medical Center, (Brooklyn, NY, USA)
- Long Island Jewish Forest Hills, (Forest Hills, NY, USA)
- Long Island Jewish Medical Center, (New Hyde Park, NY, USA)
- National Jewish Health, (Denver, CO, USA)
- UofL Health - Jewish Hospital, (Louisville, KY, USA)

== Former Jewish Hospitals ==
- Shanghai Jewish Hospital, now Eye and ENT Hospital of Fudan University, (Shanghai, China)
- The Jewish Hospital in Warsaw, (Warsaw, Poland)
- Tunis Jewish Hospital, (Tunis, Tunisia)
- Brooklyn Jewish Hospital and Medical Center, (Brooklyn, NY, USA)
- Jewish Maternity Hospital, (Manhattan, NY, USA)
- Jewish Hospital for the Aged, Infirmed and Destitute, (Philadelphia, PA, USA)

== See also ==
- Beth Israel Hospital (disambiguation), hospitals that are traditionally Jewish
- Mount Sinai Hospital (disambiguation), hospitals that are traditionally Jewish
- Sinai Hospital (disambiguation), most of which are traditionally Jewish
