= Sinai Hospital =

Sinai Hospital may refer to:

- South Sinai Hospital, Sharm el-Sheik, Egypt
- Sinai Hospital of Baltimore, Baltimore, Maryland, USA
- Sinai Hospital (Detroit), Michigan, USA
- Huron Valley-Sinai Hospital, Commerce Township, Michigan, USA
- Mount Sinai Hospital (Manhattan), New York City, New York, USA
- Cedars Sinai Hospital, Los Angeles, California, USA
- Sinai Health System, Toronto, Ontario, Canada; a hospital system
- Sinai Chicago, Chicago, Illinois, USA; a hospital system

== See also ==
- Jewish Hospital (disambiguation)
- Mount Sinai Hospital (disambiguation)
- Sinai (disambiguation)
