= Horeb =

Horeb may refer to:

- Mount Horeb, possibly another name for the Biblical Mount Sinai
- Mount Horeb, Wisconsin, in Dane County, Wisconsin
- Mount Horeb Sasthamcotta, ashram in Kerala, India
- Horeb, Carmarthenshire, Wales
- Horeb, Ohio, United States
- Horeb Chapel, Llwydcoed, Rhondda Cynon Taf, Wales
- A work of Jewish philosophy by Rabbi Samson Raphael Hirsch

== See also ==
- Mount Sinai (disambiguation)
