= Kuching International Airport =

Airport serving Kuching, Sarawak, Malaysia

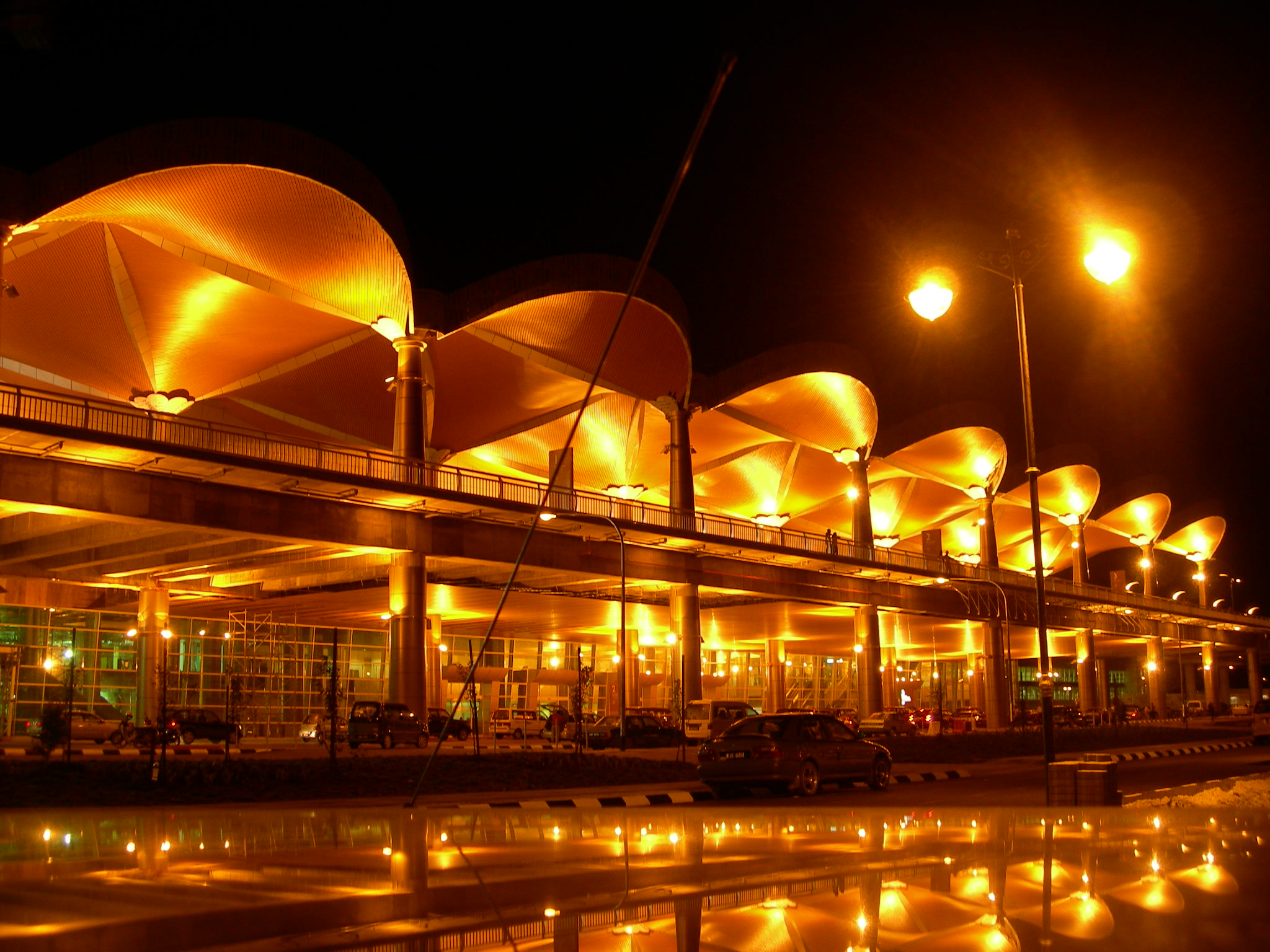
- IATA: KCH; ICAO: WBGG

Summary
- Airport type: Public / military
- Owner: Khazanah Nasional
- Operator: Malaysia Airports Holdings Berhad
- Serves: Kuching Metropolitan Area (also Kuching Division, Samarahan Division & Serian Division of Sarawak, Malaysia)
- Location: Kuching, Sarawak, Malaysia
- Opened: 26 September 1950; 76 years ago
- Hub for: AirBorneo
- Operating base for: AirAsia
- Time zone: MST (UTC+08:00)
- Elevation AMSL: 89 ft (27 m)
- Coordinates: 01°29′13.5″N 110°20′30.9″E

Map
- Location in Sarawak state Location in East Malaysia Location in Borneo Location in Malaysia Location in Southeast Asia

Runways
Direction	Length		Surface
Direction	m	ft	Surface
07/25	3,780	12,402	Asphalt

Statistics (2025)
- Passenger: 5,763,279 (▲7.0%)
- Airfreight (tonnes): 47,836 (▼8.6%)
- Aircraft movements: 50,194 (▲6.9%)
- Source: official website AIP Malaysia

Kuching International Airport (KIA) (IATA: KCH, ICAO: WBGG) is an international airport serving the entire southwestern region of Sarawak, Malaysia. It is located 11 km (6.8 mi) south of Kuching city centre. The airport is colocated with the RMAF Kuching Air Base, home to the No. 7 Squadron RMAF.

The airport terminal is capable of handling five million passengers per annum and it is the fourth busiest airport in Malaysia. KIA has grown rapidly with an increasing number of passengers and aircraft movement. In 2025, KIA handled 5,763,279 passengers with a corresponding volume of 50,194 flights. In the same year, 47,836 metric tonnes of cargo were handled through this facility.

KIA currently serves as the main hub for its own regional airline, AirBorneo, as well as one of the main operating bases for AirAsia and has been growing rapidly to tackle the demand of the travellers in the Sarawak region.

== History ==
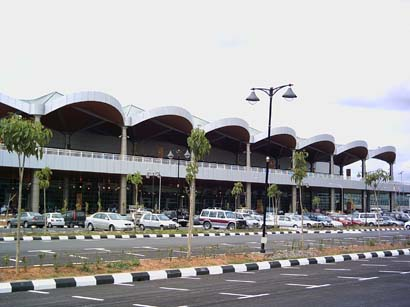
The terminal building

An airstrip in Kuching was first constructed at 7th Mile (Bukit Stabar) in 1938, measuring 700 yards (640 m) long by 300 yards (270 m) wide. An airport terminal building was later completed and opened for use on 26 September 1950. The airport consisted of a small L-shaped single-storey passenger terminal, a small cargo facility, and an airport fire station. Air Traffic Control Tower, Meteorological Service and Maintenance building were clustered in one area, a small apron of four parking bays and a single runway which was 1,372 metres long and 46 metres wide. Navigational (Directional Finding Equipment) and Radio Aids were installed at the airport.

Kuching International Airport then became the gateway to Sarawak with the introduction of once weekly Douglas Dakota twin-engined piston aircraft services originating from Singapore by Malayan Airways. By the end of 1954, scheduled air services into Kuching International Airport grew by leaps and bounds. This was depicted in the 1954 statistics which recorded 1,550 aircraft movements, 13,564 passengers, 95,911 kilogrammes of cargo and 25,984 mails. In 1959, the runway was extended to 1,555 metres in length to make way for Vickers Viscount turboprop aircraft operations.

In 1962, the runway was extended once more to a length of 1,921 meters to facilitate DeHavilland Comet-4 turbojet aircraft operations. The terminal was also enlarged in the same year. A Control Zone was established at Kuching in November as a part of a plan to provide an Air Traffic Control Service commensurate with the growth of air traffic. Malayan Airways Limited operated the Singapore / British Borneo Territories Regional Services with Vickers Viscount and Douglas DC-3 aircraft, daily schedules linked Kuching and Sibu with Singapore on the other side; and connection via Borneo Airways to Brunei and Borneo on the other.

In 1971, the Malaysian Government (as Sarawak joined the Federation of Malaysia on 16 November 1963) engaged a team of Canadian Consultants to make a Master Plan study of Kuching International Airport.

In December 1972, the government accepted the Consultant's report. Among the recommendations were:

- The extension and strengthening of existing runway to enable operations by larger jet-powered aircraft
- The construction of a new terminal building on the north site of the runway

Work on the strengthening and extension of the runway to 2,454 metres (8,051 ft) in length started in 1973 and was completed in 1976, capable of handling Boeing 707 turbofan aircraft.

In 1980, consistent with the advent of Airbus A300B4 operations, it was imperative that the runway pavement strength be upgraded to meet the requirements of that particular aircraft. Work on this was completed in early 1982.

Construction of the terminal complex at the north site took a centre stage at the end of 1978 and was completed in July 1983. This modern terminal replaced the previous terminal, and was opened for business on 24 August 1983. The terminal complex covered a built-up area of 81 hectares with a floor space of 13,000 square metres, comprised the three-storey passenger terminal flanked by neatly planned buildings which consisted of the Air Traffic Control Tower and operations block, a larger freight facility, a new airport fire station, Maintenance Building, VIP Building and ancillary services building.

An extension of the airport, consisting of extending the existing runway to accommodate "jumbo jets", reconstruction of the existing terminal was planned in 1991, costing RM 240 million, with the runway extension taking 60% of the total cost. It was planned to be completed in 1994.

As of 1999, two foreign airlines (Singapore Airlines and Royal Brunei Airlines) from both Singapore and Brunei as well as Malaysia's national carrier and as many as eight private general aviation companies operated scheduled services into and out of Kuching International Airport. Non-scheduled charter flights were also operated by two foreign airlines. As of 2018, however, four of Malaysia's airlines (Malaysia Airlines, MasWings, Air Asia and Malindo Air) as well as four cargo operators (Asia Cargo Express, MASKargo, Raya Airways and Neptune Air) operate to and from Kuching International Airport. They are joined by three foreign carriers (Royal Brunei Airlines, Scoot and Wings Air). In 2019, Royal Brunei, in a joint venture with Malindo Air, further connected Kuching to BWN using Malindo Air's ATR aircraft. Foreign airlines that have previously provided services to Kuching were Singapore Airlines, Dragonair, Hong Kong Airlines, Jetstar Asia, Merpati Nusantara Airlines, Silk Air, Batavia Air, Kalstar Airlines, Xpress Air and Tiger Airways. The latter returned to Kuching after merging with Scoot while Xpress Air stopped services following stiff competition from AirAsia and Wings Air on the Kuching-Pontianak route as well as Xpress Air concentrating on domestic routes due to Xpress Air's core business.

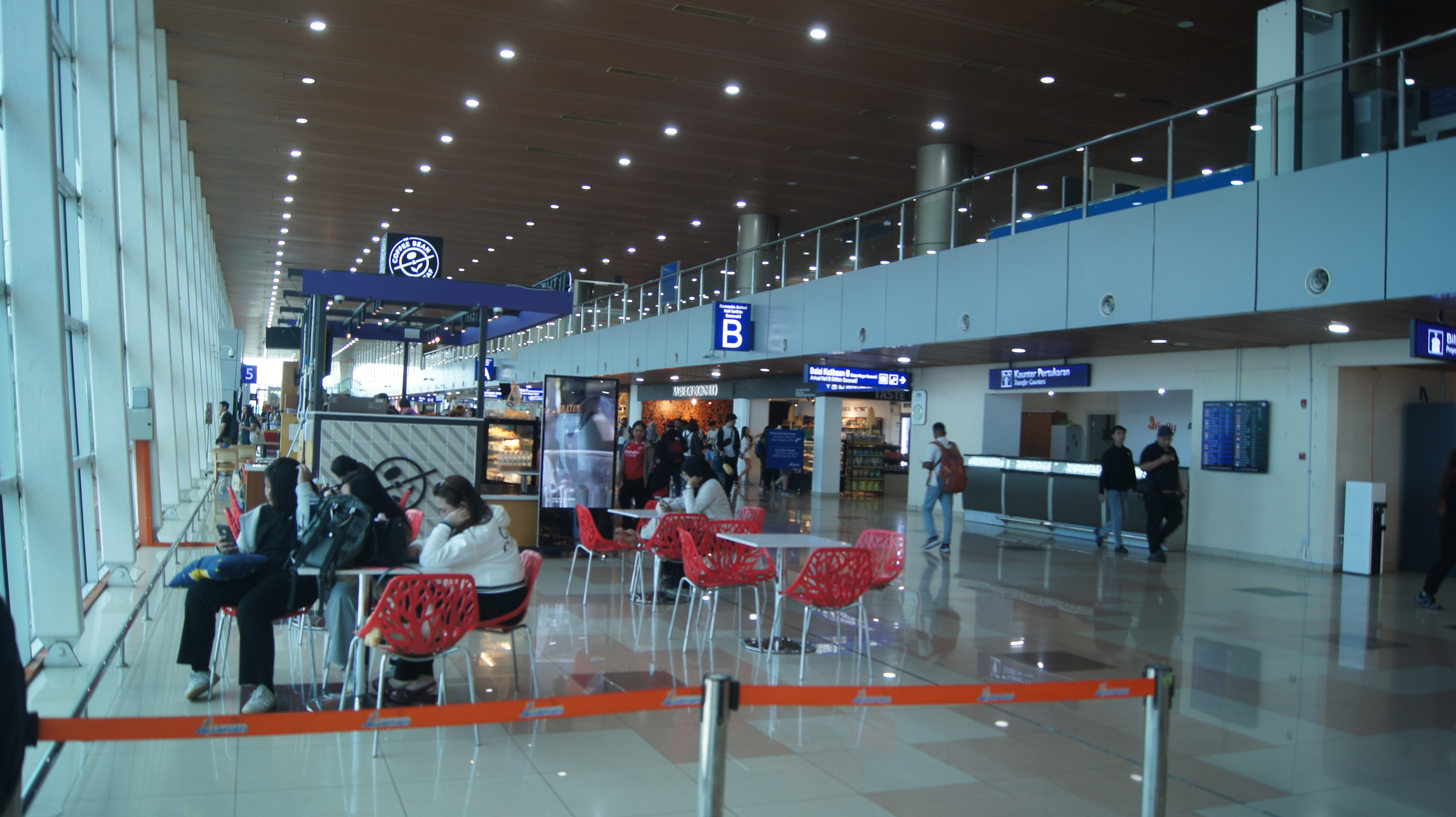
Domestic Airport Concourse of Kuching International Airport

As a result of the increasing number of passengers going into and out of Kuching, a completely new and larger terminal was needed. Construction started in the early 2000s, and progressed at an incredible pace. The new terminal was literally constructed from the inside out, with the old terminal slowly being chipped away and replaced by new sections of the new terminal. The new terminal complex was finally opened on 16 January 2006 by the Chief Minister of Sarawak Pehin Sri Haji Abdul Taib Mahmud and the then Malaysian Minister of Transport Dato' Sri Chan Kong Choy. The full work on the terminal, however, was only completed in April 2006. The new terminal consists of 12 aerobridge aircraft parking bays (four bays for widebody aircraft such as Airbus A330/A350/A380-800, Boeing 747/777 and 5 bays for narrow body aircraft, principally Boeing 738/9 and A319/320), four remote parking bays (for turboprop aircraft such as Fokker 50, DHC-6-300/400 Twin Otter and ATR 72-500/600), plus three new aircraft parking bays located at the general aviation section.

== Expansion, renovation and redevelopment ==
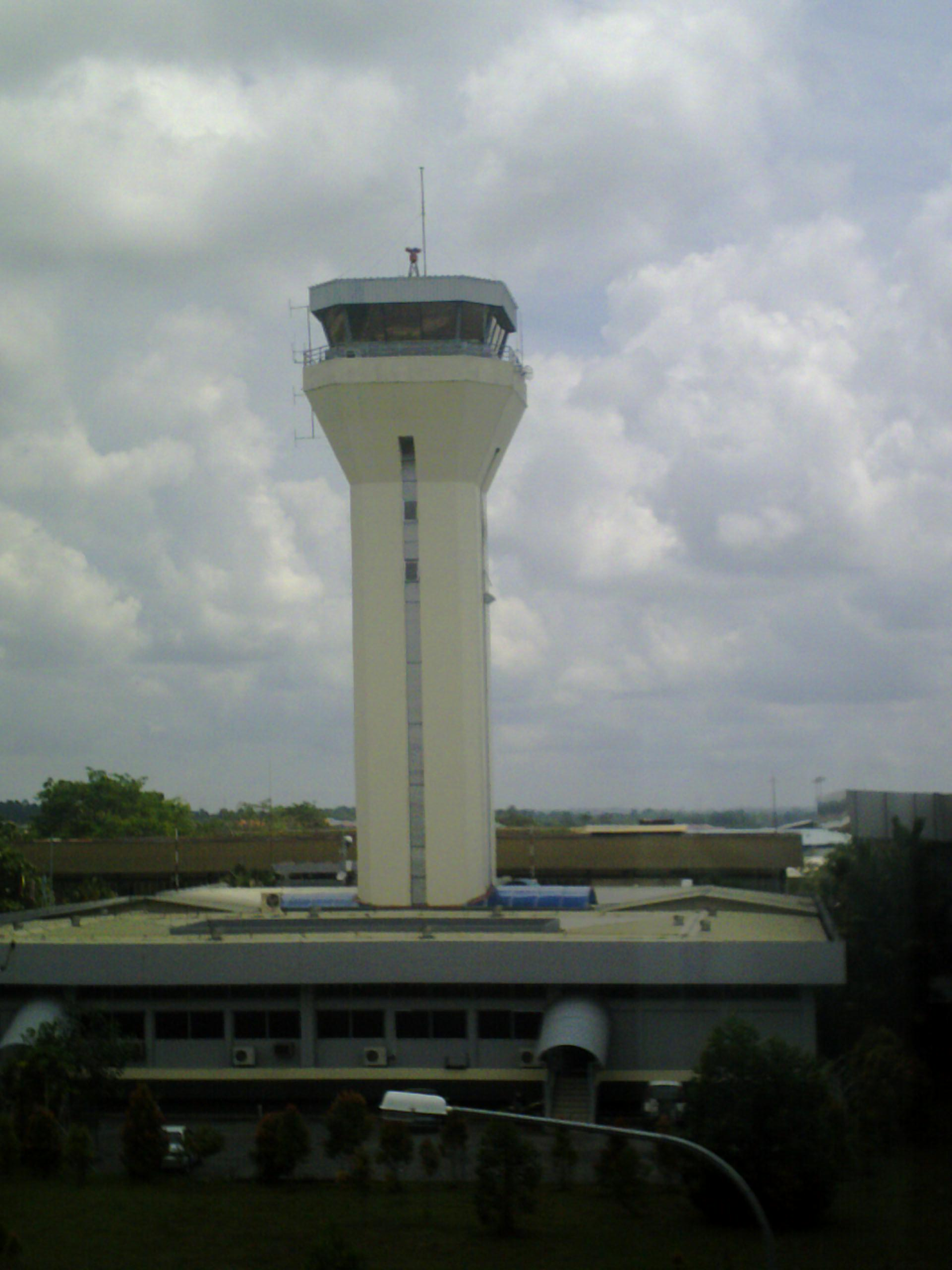
Control tower

Kuching International Airport was given a radical makeover, with the terminal completed in 2006 and the runway and taxiway extension fully completed in 2008. The renovations borrowed many design features from Kuala Lumpur's then-new airport (KL International Airport opened in 1998, replacing the overcrowded Subang-Sultan Abdul Aziz Shah Airport), so the two have a similar look.

The renovation increased terminal building floor space to 46,000 square metres (500,000 sq ft) and was completed 15 months ahead of schedule. The fully renovated terminal building was officially opened by the then Prime Minister of Malaysia Tun Abdullah Ahmad Badawi on 17 April 2006. The project was handled by Global Upline Sdn. Bhd. and it cost some MYR620,000,000 (US$186,000,000). With this, the airport is capable of handling widebody aircraft such as Boeing 747-400 and Airbus A380-800 (albeit with airside restrictions on the runway and taxiway network).

The completed works involved above ground-level (AGL) earthworks and pavement upgrades, extension of the runway length from 2454 metres to 3780 metres, widening of shoulders from 46 metres to 60 metres, extension of parallel taxiway to a full parallel taxiway with interconnection/rapid exit taxiways including widening of taxiway fillets and shoulders to 30 metres. The air-side apron works included the construction of a cargo apron, high-intensity lightings and markings. Visual and non-visual aids will be upgraded and/or relocated consistent with the upgrading plan to serve the extended runway. With nine gates, the airport can handle six narrow body aircraft (such as Boeing 737 and Airbus A320), three widebody aircraft and four turboprop aircraft. Of note, gate number 9 was specifically constructed for Airbus A380-800 operations.

== Present and future ==
The former Chief Minister of Sarawak, Pehin Sri Haji Abdul Taib Mahmud, had wished to attract more foreign airlines to KIA so as to develop the Sarawak Tourism Industry. Singapore's former budget airline, Tiger Airways, had been given the green light to serve Kuching International Airport (the airline has since discontinued service to Kuching after only a few years, as did its closest competitor, Jetstar Asia). Since then however, Scoot, a low-cost subsidiary of Singapore Airlines, has taken on the mantle of serving flights to Singapore along with AirAsia.

As of 2025, the Premier of Sarawak, Abang Abdul Rahman Zohari bin Abang Openg, has announced plans to build a new international airport near the coastal area of Tanjung Embang to replace the existing airport as the current rate of growth of the terminal will soon become incapable of catering to growing passenger traffic. The current terminal however will remain as a hub for regional and domestic air travel. The new airport will also share its location with a brand new deep sea port as well as a PETROS gas terminal. There are also plans to connect the existing terminal to the newly planned international terminal located at Tanjung Embang using the Kuching Urban Transportation System much like the connection between KLIA Terminal 1 and Terminal 2 although it is unclear whether or not the upcoming Red Line will be used or an entirely new line will be built.

The Sarawak Government had also planned to set up a boutique airline to be operated by Hornbill Skyways, a state-owned airline company. The airline's operations would also focus on a strategic hub and that the initial plan is to provide direct flights from Sarawak to Singapore, Kuala Lumpur, Jakarta, Denpasar, Bangkok and Hong Kong. However, plans for such an idea have shifted and the Sarawak Government has since transformed MASwings, the former regional carrier under Malaysia Airlines meant to serve the Bornean states, into a full-service carrier which is now known as AirBorneo and has started operations at the airport since 2 January 2026.

== Airlines and destinations ==
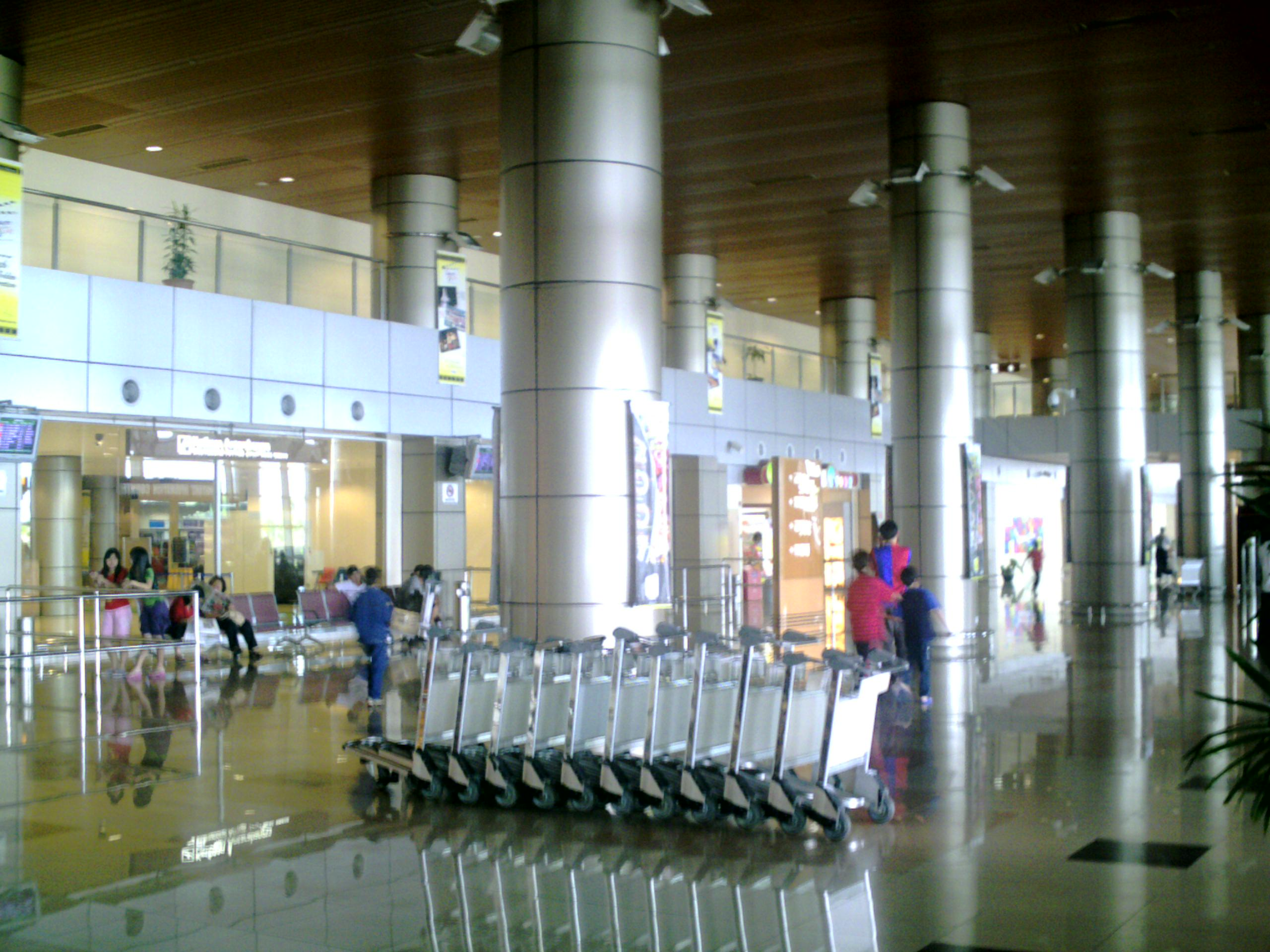
KIA arrival hall

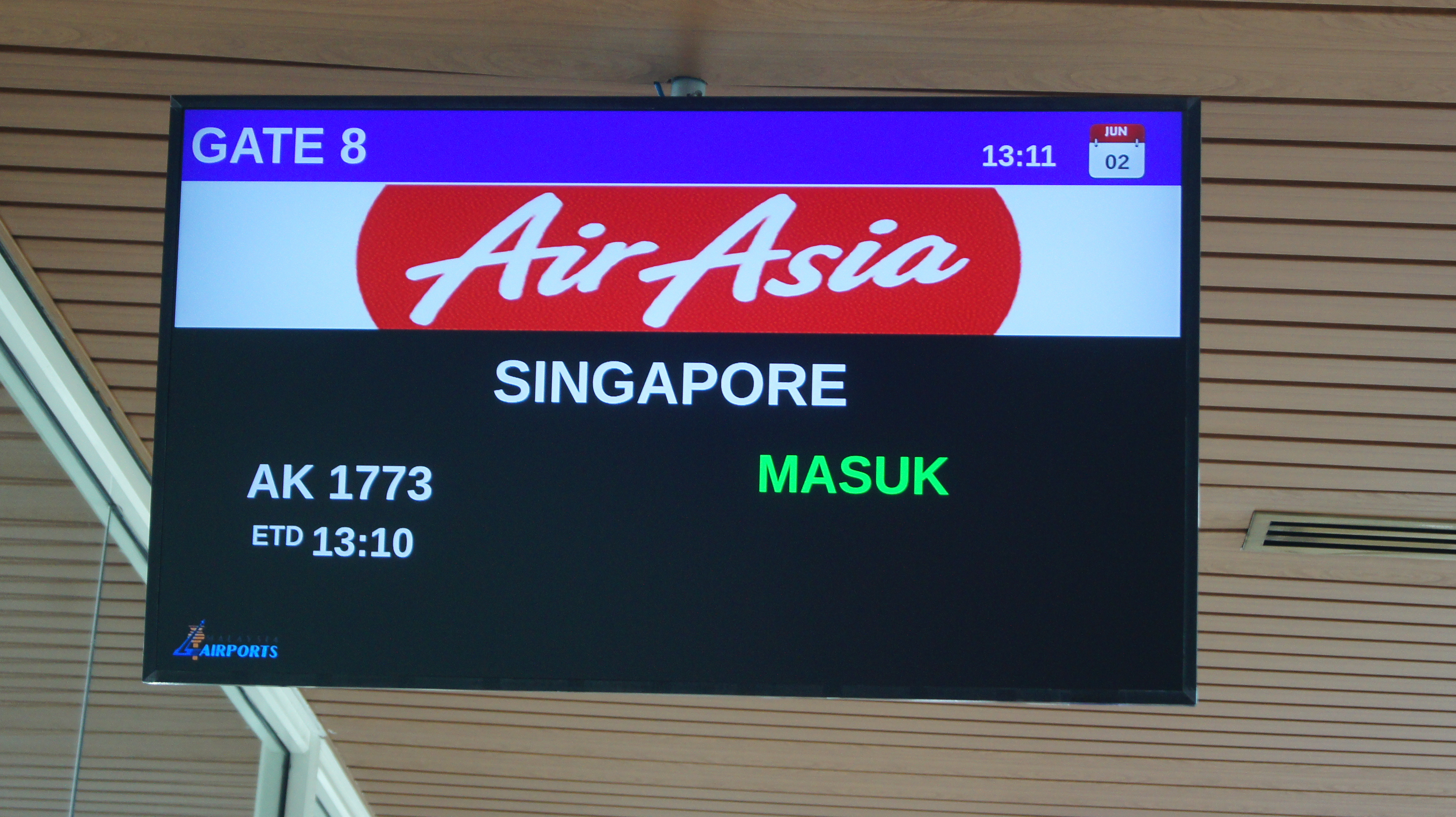
Flight Information Display System calling for an AirAsia flight

=== Passenger ===
Airlines	Destinations
9 Air	Charter: Guiyang, Haikou
Air Changan	Charter: Yichang
AirAsia	Bintulu, Johor Bahru, Kota Bharu, Kota Kinabalu, Kuala Lumpur–International, Miri, Penang, Pontianak, Sibu, Singapore
AirBorneo	Jakarta–Soekarno-Hatta, Kuala Lumpur–International, Limbang, Mukah, Mulu, Singapore, Tanjung Manis
Batik Air Malaysia	Kuala Lumpur–International, Kuala Lumpur–Subang; Charter: Guangzhou, Kunming (begins 3 March 2027)
Firefly	Kuala Lumpur–International; Seasonal: Chongqing
Hong Kong Airlines	Charter: Hong Kong
Indonesia AirAsia	Jakarta–Soekarno-Hatta
Loong Air	Seasonal: Shenzhen
Malaysia Airlines	Kuala Lumpur–International
Royal Brunei Airlines	Bandar Seri Begawan
Scoot	Singapore

=== Cargo ===
Airlines	Destinations
MASkargo	Kuala Lumpur–International

== Traffic and statistics ==
=== Traffic ===
Annual passenger numbers and aircraft statistics
Year	Passengers handled	Passenger % change	Cargo (tonnes)	Cargo % change	Aircraft movements	Aircraft % change
2003	2,923,633	Steady	26,278	Steady	42,138	Steady
2004	3,317,879	▲13.5	26,073	▼0.8	45,340	▲7.6
2005	3,354,973	▲1.1	28,407	▲8.9	43,253	▼4.0
2006	3,196,352	▼4.7	29,716	▲4.6	40,292	▼7.4
2007	3,236,468	▲1.3	23,818	▼19.8	37,348	▼7.3
2008	3,238,614	▲0.07	19,166	▼19.5	39,188	▲4.9
2009	3,574,632	▲10.4	20,830	▲8.7	44,761	▲14.2
2010	3,684,517	▲3.1	26,977	▲29.5	46,382	▲3.6
2011	4,286,722	▲16.3	24,787	▼8.1	53,154	▲14.6
2012	4,186,523	▼2.3	15,811	▼36.2	46,727	▼12.1
2013	4,871,036	▲16.4	21,993	▲39.1	56,085	▲20.0
2014	4,852,822	▼0.4	28,040	▲27.5	53,490	▼4.6
2015	4,772,453	▼1.7	29,362	▲4.7	53,303	▼0.3
2016	4,919,677	▲3.1	22,500	▼23.4	51,855	▼2.7
2017	5,095,193	▲3.6	24,620	▲9.4	51,097	▼1.5
2018	5,564,722	▲9.2	26,819	▲8.9	56,876	▲11.3
2019	5,956,141	▲7.0	25,072	▼6.5	55,682	▼2.1
2020	1,780,417	▼70.1	30,724	▲22.5	26,757	▼51.9
2021	840,425	▼52.8	55,823	▲81.7	19,717	▼26.3
2022	4,340,393	▲416.5	49,968	▼10.5	43,351	▲119.9
2023	5,327,787	▲18.5	43,606	▼12.7	45,598	▲4.9
2024	5,383,947	▲1.0	52,391	▲16.8	46,947	▲2.9
2025	5,763,279	▲7.0	47,836	▼8.6	50,194	▲6.9
^{Source: Malaysia Airports Holdings Berhad}

=== Statistics ===
Busiest domestic flights out of Kuching International Airport by frequency as of January 2026
Rank	Destinations (operated by)	Frequency (weekly)	Airlines
1	Kuala Lumpur	173	AK, MH, OD, FY
2	Miri, Sarawak	46	AK
3	Kota Kinabalu, Sabah	37	AK, OD
4	Bintulu, Sarawak	35	AK
5	Sibu, Sarawak	35	AK
6	Johor Bahru, Johor	27	AK
7	Mukah, Sarawak	21	MY
8	Penang, Penang	14	AK
9	Tanjung Manis, Sarawak	7	MY
9	Mulu, Sarawak	7	MY
9	Limbang, Sarawak	7	MY
12	Kota Bharu, Kelantan	3	AK

Busiest international flights out of Kuching International Airport as of January 2026
Rank	Destination	Frequency (weekly)	Airlines
1	Singapore	19	AK, TR
2	Pontianak, Indonesia	14	AK
3	Jakarta, Indonesia	5	QZ
4	Bandar Seri Begawan, Brunei	4	BI

== Baggage handling system (BHS) ==
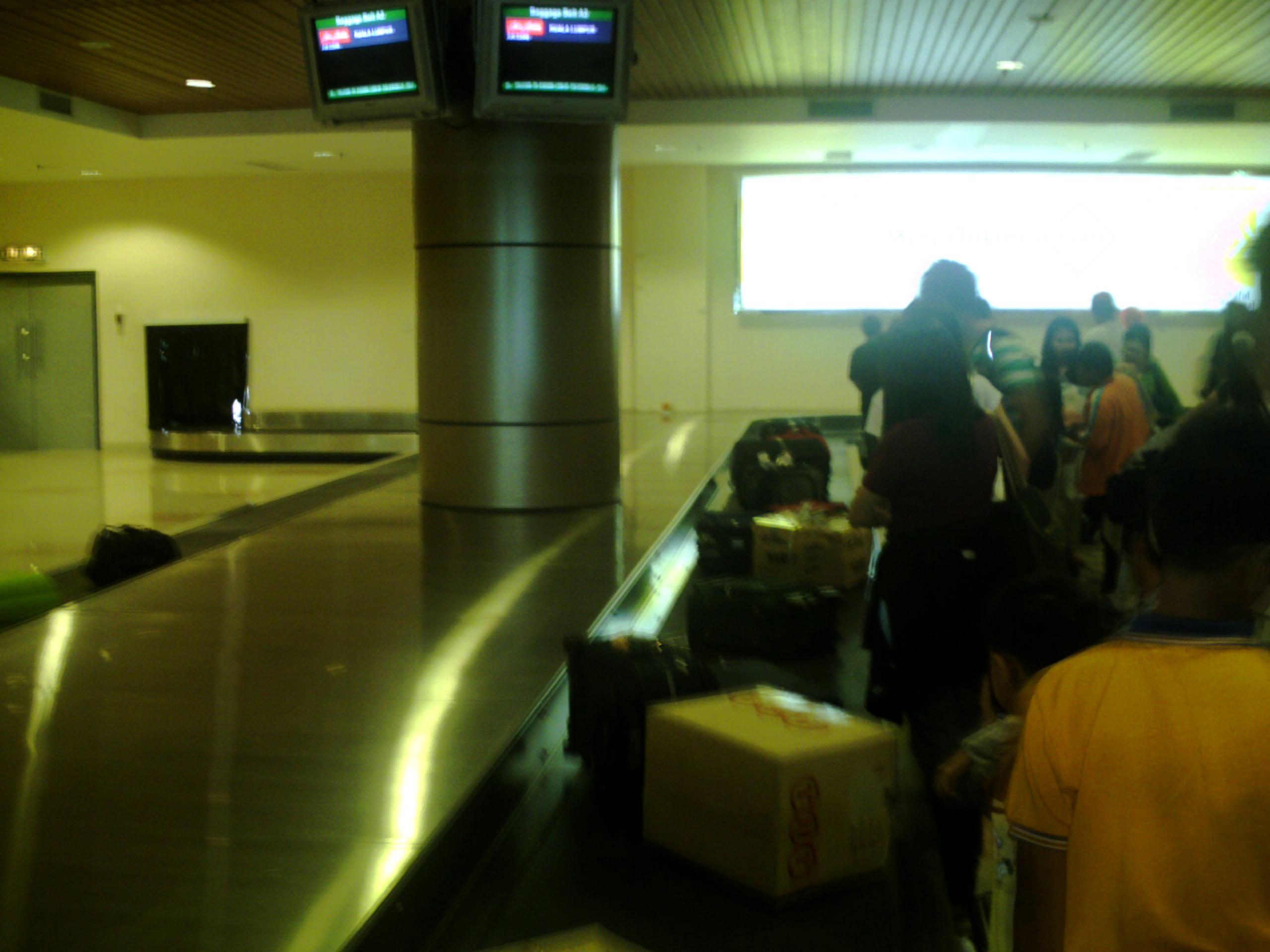
KIA conveyor belts

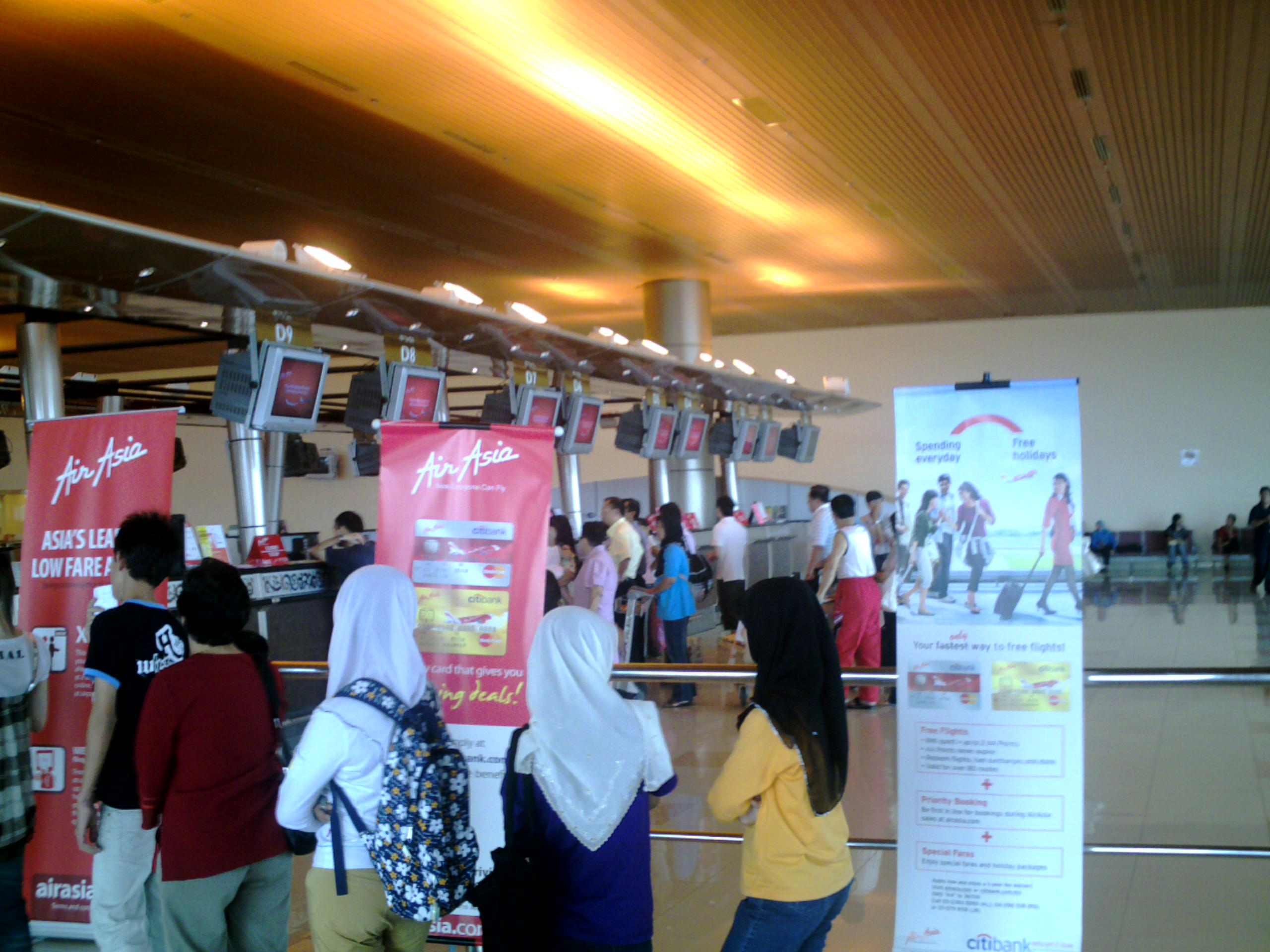
AirAsia check in counters

Kuching International Airport has two sides of baggage reclaim halls. One is for the domestic flights (within Sarawak) while the other one is for both international flights and flights outside Sarawak (Peninsular Malaysia and Sabah).

== Immigration ==
As one of the two states in Malaysia which controls its own immigration autonomy, Sarawak exercises special regulation upon arriving and departing from all Sarawakian airports including Kuching. All passengers travelling with any flights from outside Sarawak (including all flights from Peninsular Malaysia, Sabah, Federal Territory of Labuan and outside Malaysia), must pass through the immigration control at the first entry airport.

== Ground transportation ==
There are currently 3 bus routes that connect to the airport arrival hall; the BAS.MY routes numbered Q14 and Q15 which operates hourly, and a free electric city bus operated by Kuching Metro with a route numbered 103 which operates every hour and a half daily. A taxi coupon ticket can also be bought at the Taxi Coupon Counter however, ridesharing services provided by AirAsia MOVE, Grab, Maxim, and Gojo are also available and are the most popular mode of transport to and from the airport.

Once completed, the airport will be connected using the Kuching Urban Transportation System via the SR06 Kuching International Airport ART station on the Red Line, which serves as its namesake and will be located in the middle of the airport parking lot with a pedestrian bridge connecting to the station from the departure drop-off zone.

== Awards and recognition ==
- KIA received the MS ISO 9001:2000 for Airport Management, Operations and Maintenance of Airport Covering Fire and Rescue Services, Aviation Security, Engineering and General Operations in the year of 2005.
- Aerodrome Certification from the Department of Civil Aviation (DCA) was awarded to KIA in 2005 where KIA is being the second airport in Malaysia, after Kuala Lumpur International Airport to receive the prestigious certification.
- MAS in Kuching International Airport (KIA) achieved zero occupational accidents in 2006, making it one of the best stations in the country.
- Kuching International Airport was accorded Platinum and Star status by International Air Transport Association (IATA) in recognition of their barcoded boarding passes project as well as satisfying various guidelines from check-in, baggage drop and security control to boarding.

== Incidents and accidents ==
- On 13 January 2007, a Boeing 737-200 belonging to the Gading Sari Aviation Services Sdn Bhd crash-landed while attempting to land at 5.52 am. The aircraft's fuselage was badly damaged, and the landing gears and right engine were torn off during the crash. All four crew members escaped unhurt. The airport was closed for six hours while the plane was towed away from the crash site and debris cleared from the runway. Departures and arrivals of 16 MAS and 14 AirAsia flights were delayed affecting 2,200 passengers – 1,000 passengers of MAS and 1,200 from AirAsia. An earlier flight from Kuala Lumpur had to be diverted to Miri Airport. Damage included navigational lights – eight taxi lights, five runway edge lights, two end lights, and one precision approach path indicator. It reopened at noon.
- On 2 October 2009, Malaysia Airlines Boeing 737-4H6 9M-MMR was substantially damaged when the port main undercarriage collapsed while the aircraft was parked at the gate.

== See also ==
- Indonesia–Malaysia confrontation
- Far East Air Force (Royal Air Force)
- List of former Royal Air Force stations
