= Mukah Airport =

Mukah Airport Lapangan Terbang Mukah
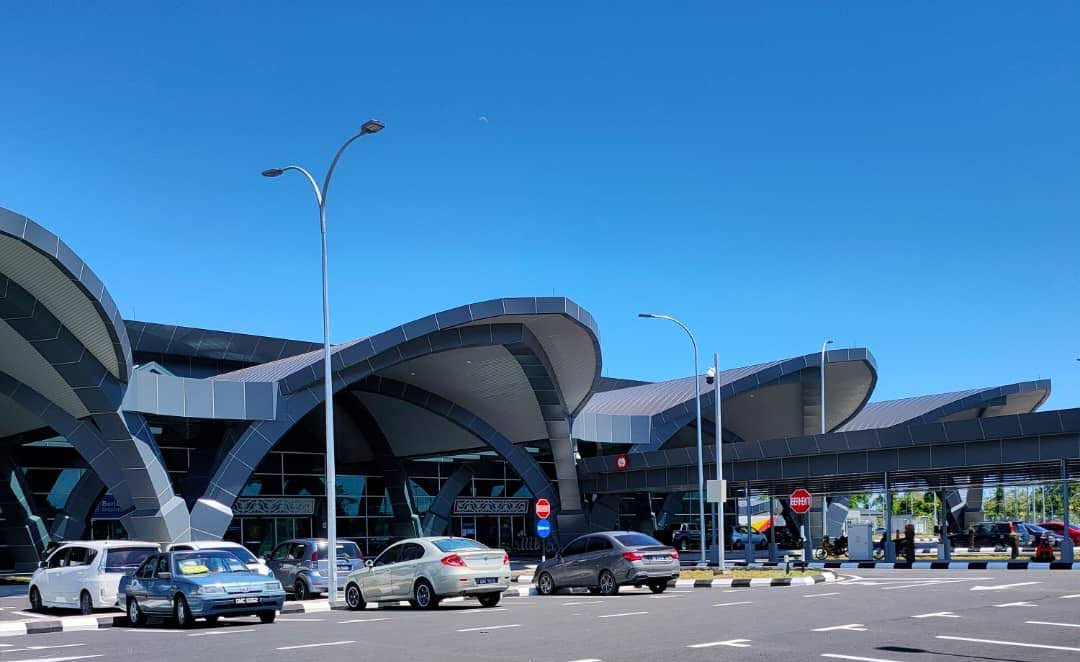
- IATA: MKM; ICAO: WBGK

Summary
- Airport type: Public
- Owner: Government of Malaysia
- Operator: Malaysia Airports Holdings Berhad
- Serves: Mukah Division, Sarawak, East Malaysia
- Location: Mukah, Sarawak, East Malaysia
- Time zone: MST (UTC+08:00)
- Elevation AMSL: 19.685 ft (6.000 m)
- Coordinates: 02°52′55″N 112°02′36″E

Map
- Location in East Malaysia

Runways
Direction	Length		Surface
Direction	m	ft	Surface
15/33	1,500	4,921	Asphalt

Statistics (2025)
- Passenger: 57,632 (▼8.4%)
- Aircraft movements: 3,302 (▼5.1%)
- Source: official website

Mukah Airport (IATA: MKM, ICAO: WBGK) is an airport in Mukah, a town in the state of Sarawak in Malaysia.

== History ==
=== Old STOLport ===
The old STOLport (Short Take-Off and Landing airport) was opened in the 1960s and could only handle 67 passengers at one time. The STOLport was equipped with a 1,097-meter bitumen runway. In 2020, the STOLport handled 29,011 passengers and 3,150 aircraft movements annually.

The old STOLport saw its last day of operations on 16 June 2021, with the final flight departing for Miri at 1.20pm.

Mukah Old STOLport
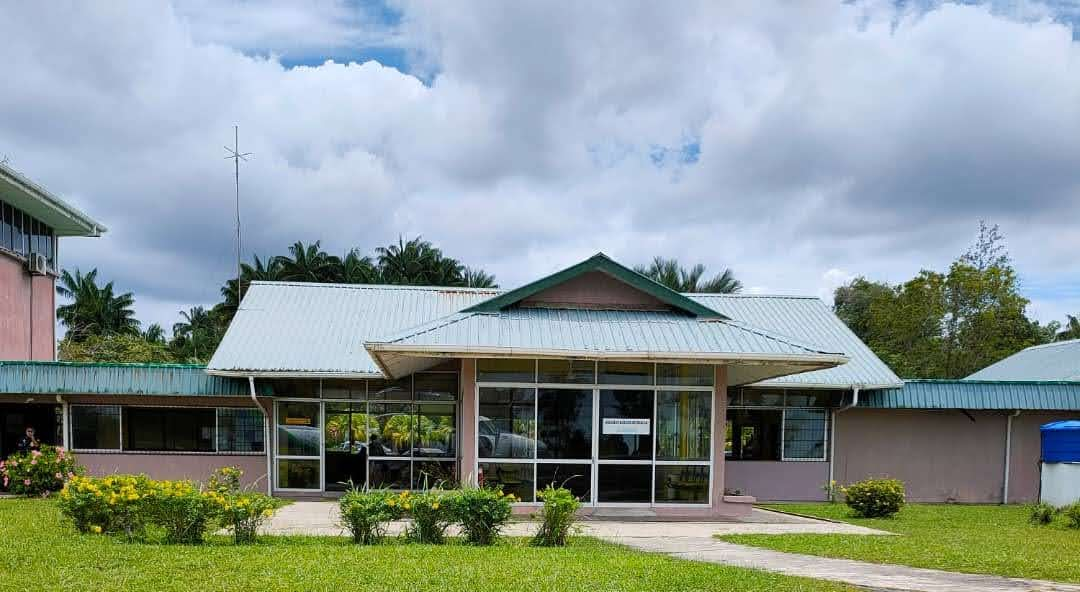
The terminal building, as seen in 2021.

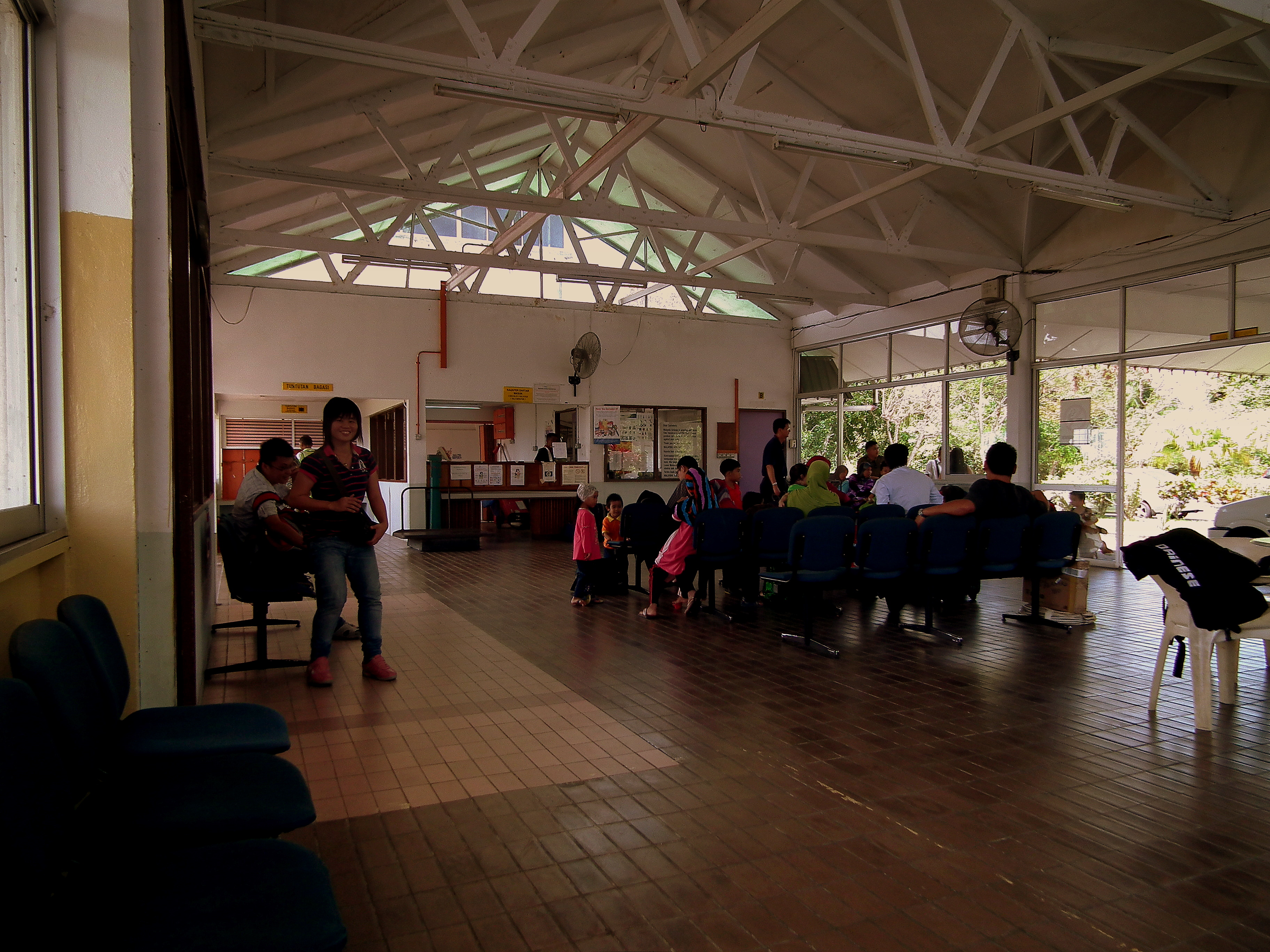
Interior of the terminal as seen in June 2011

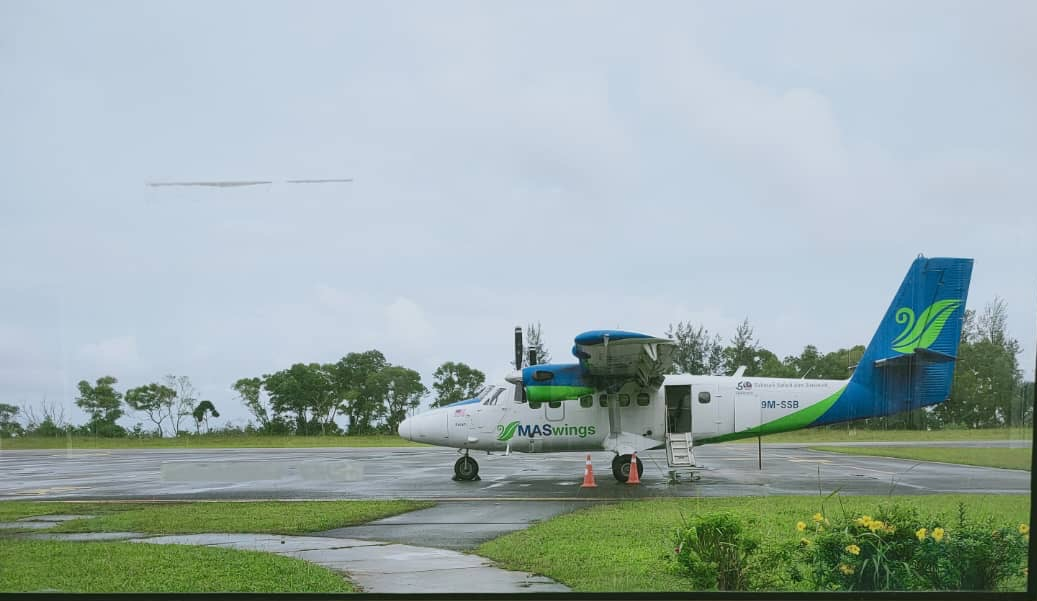
Maswings' Twin Otter plane ready to welcome passengers in January 2021

=== New airport ===
In April 2009, the federal government allocated RM436 million for a new airport in Mukah. As at 2020, the airport cost was revealed to be RM360 million by Deputy Chief Minister James Jemut Masing. Construction began in July 2017 and was scheduled to be completed by August 2020. The main contractors in this project were Ibraco Construction Sdn. Bhd. and Hock Peng Furniture & General Contractor Sdn. Bhd. Due to the Movement Control Order, the airport was expected to be operational in the second quarter of 2021, later than previously scheduled.

The airport began its operation on 17 June 2021 with the first plane, MASwings’ MH3412 Twin Otter from Miri landing at 10.05am. The same Twin Otter later made the first take off from the airport to Kuching at 10.25am.

The RM300 million new airport is located 7km from Mukah town. It is built on 285 acres (115 ha) of land area, with a 3,120 m^{2} (33,600 sq ft) terminal building, runway, air traffic control tower, offices, VIP Building, fire station and passenger waiting facilities. Other airport stakeholders' offices are housed here as well, namely the Civil Aviation Authority of Malaysia (CAAM) and the Malaysian Meteorological Department (MET). This new airport is also equipped with 100 parking bays, 20 taxi parking bays, 20 motorcycle parking bays and two bus parking bays. The new airport can accommodate up to 264,000 passengers annually and larger aircraft if needed. The airport utilizes full LED airfield ground lighting (AGL) system, making it the first fully LED monitored airport in Malaysia.

Mukah New Airport
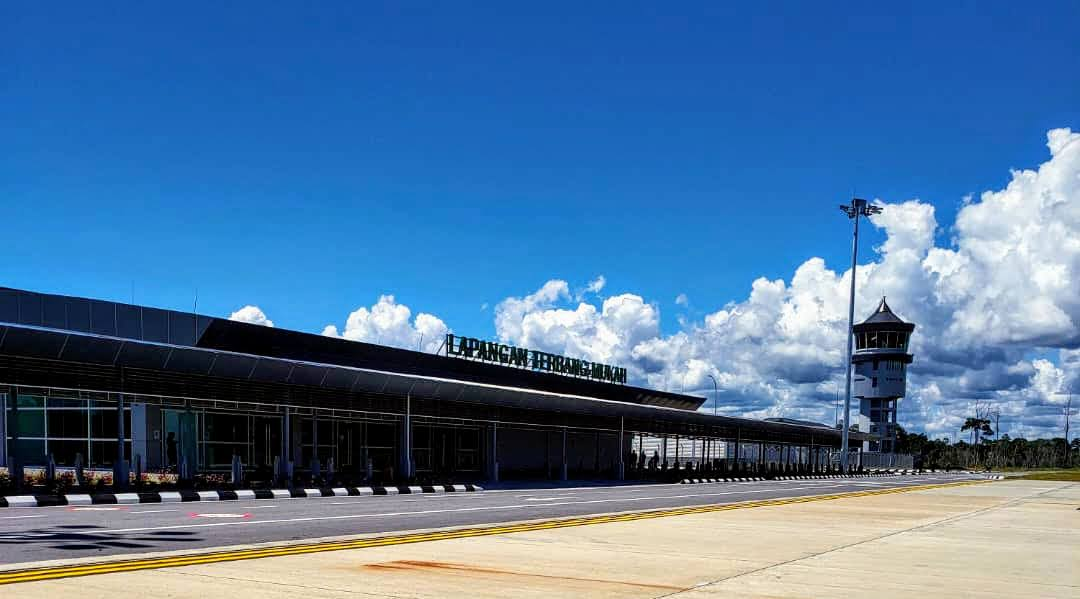
Terminal building and the traffic control tower, as seen from the taxiway

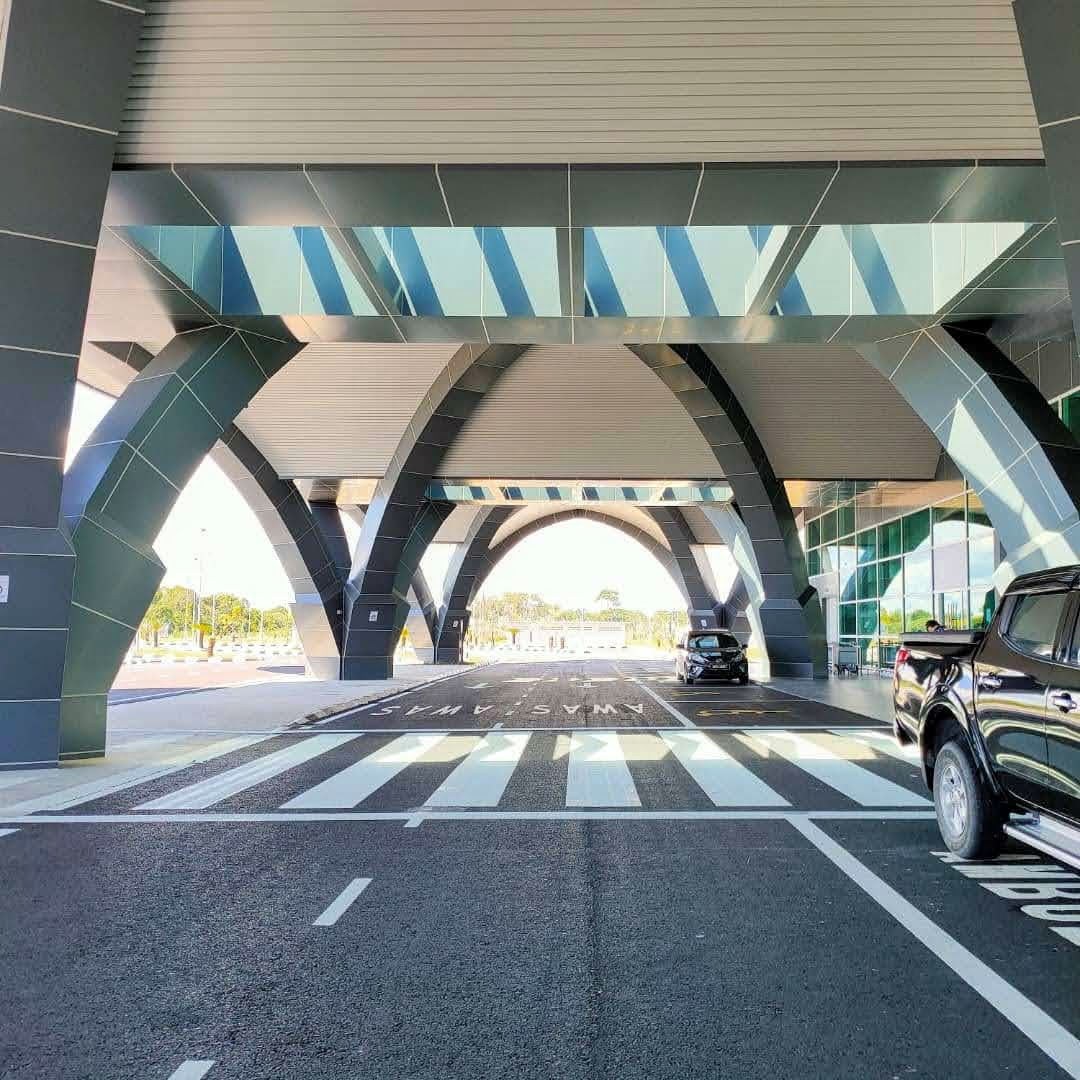
Roof design of the new terminal

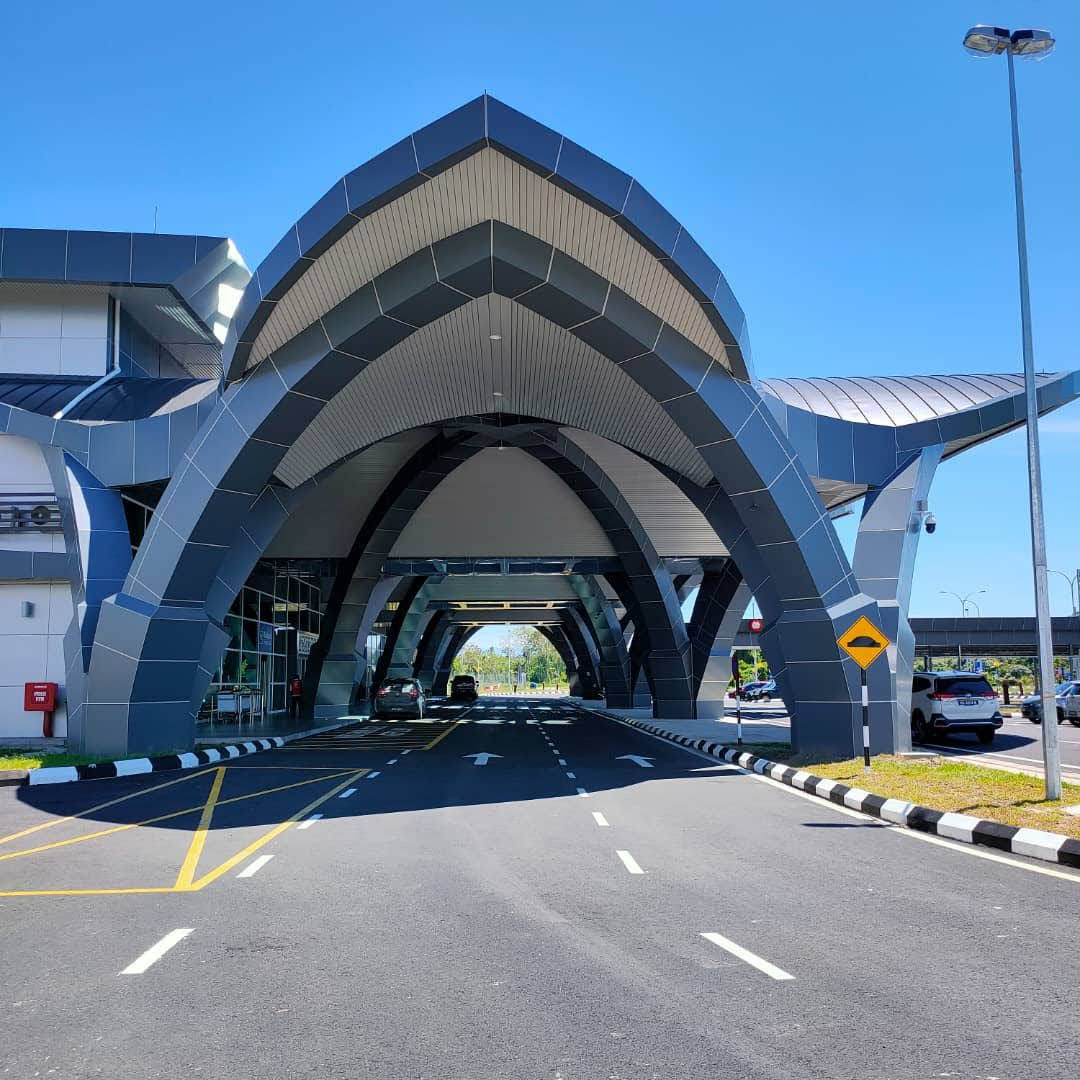
Roof design of the new terminal

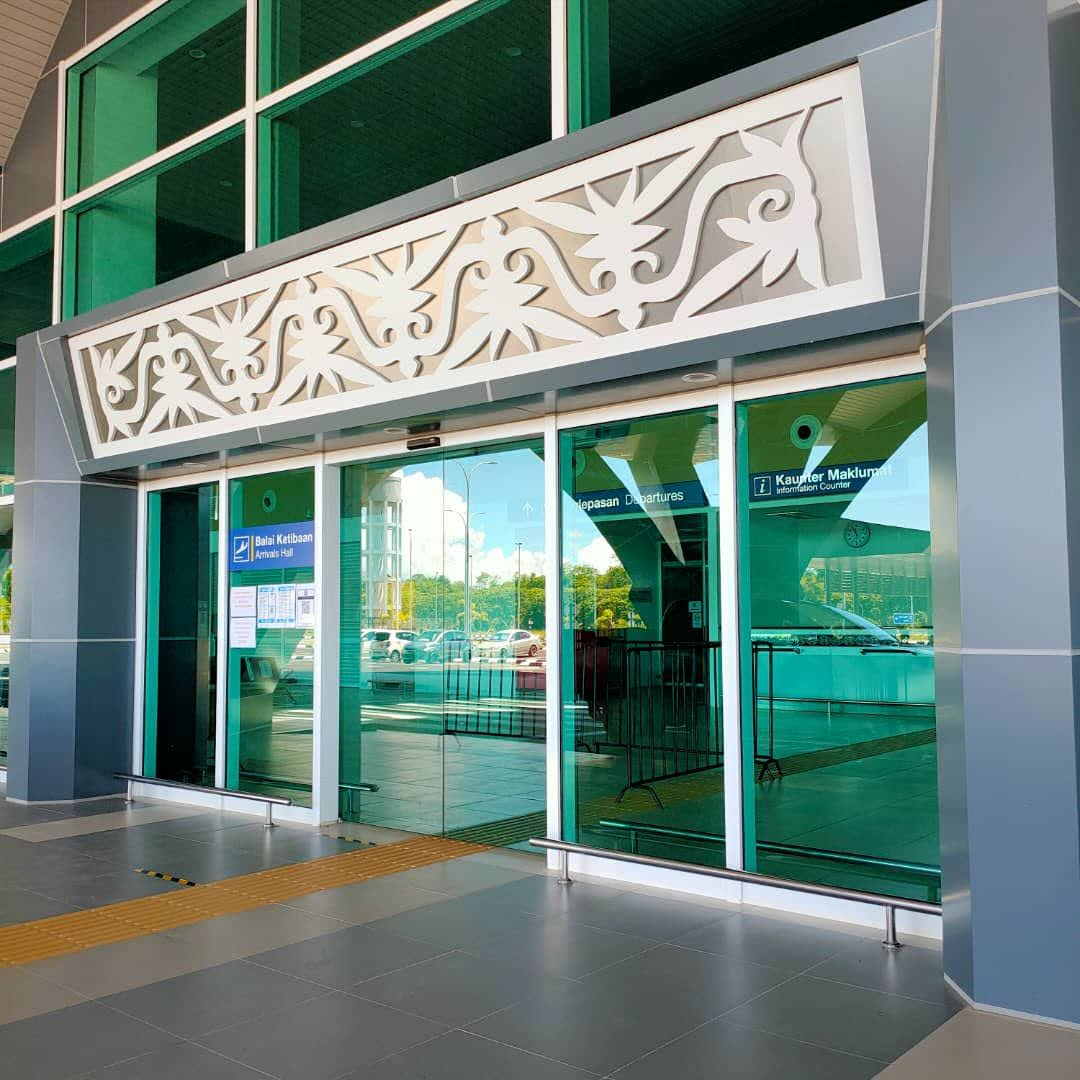
The entrance of the terminal is adorned with Sarawakian motives.

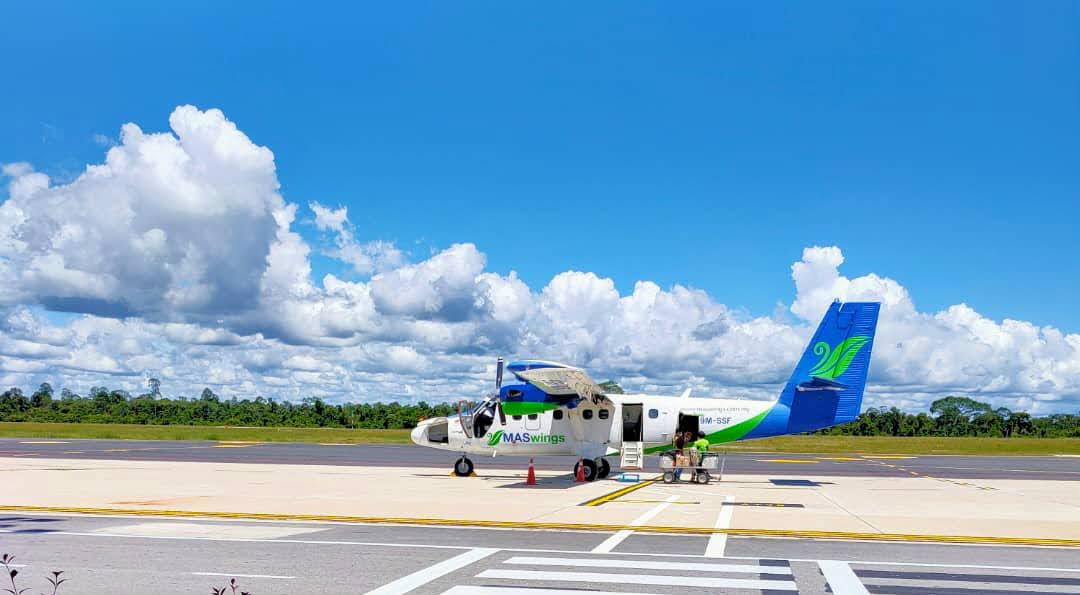
Maswings' Twin Otter plane at the parking apron

== Airlines and destinations ==
Airlines	Destinations
AirBorneo	Bintulu, Kuching, Miri, Sibu, Tanjung Manis

== Traffic and statistics ==
Annual passenger and aircraft statistics
Year	Passengers	Aircraft movements
2004	30,377	2,772
2005	31,807	2,846
2006	25,874	2,896
2007	20,908	2,378
2008	28,875	2,608
2009	34,979	2,932
2010	38,810	3,152
2011	37,450	3,258
2012	36,323	3,080
2013	34,247	2,996
2014	37,968	3,370
2015	35,935	3,258
2016	36,206	4,482
2017	37,148	4,234
2018	40,919	4,360
2019	47,557	4,318
2020	29,011	3,150
2021	30,595	3,110
2022	62,001	3,534
2023	60,640	3,554
2024	62,947	3,541
2025	57,632	3,362

== See also ==
- List of airports in Malaysia
