= Mount Sinai Cemetery =

Mount Sinai Cemetery may refer to:

- Mount Sinai Memorial Park Cemetery, California, U.S.
- Mount Sinai Cemetery, Philadelphia, Pennsylvania, U.S. - c. 1854 and oldest operating Jewish burial site in Philadelphia
- Mount Sinai Memorial Park (Toronto), Ontario, Canada
- New Mount Sinai Cemetery, St. Louis, Missouri, U.S.

== See also ==
- Monastery of the Transfiguration's charnel house, at base of Mount Sinai, in Egypt
- Mount Sinai (disambiguation)
