= Sibu Airport =

Airport in Sarawak, Malaysia

Sibu Airport Lapangan Terbang Sibu
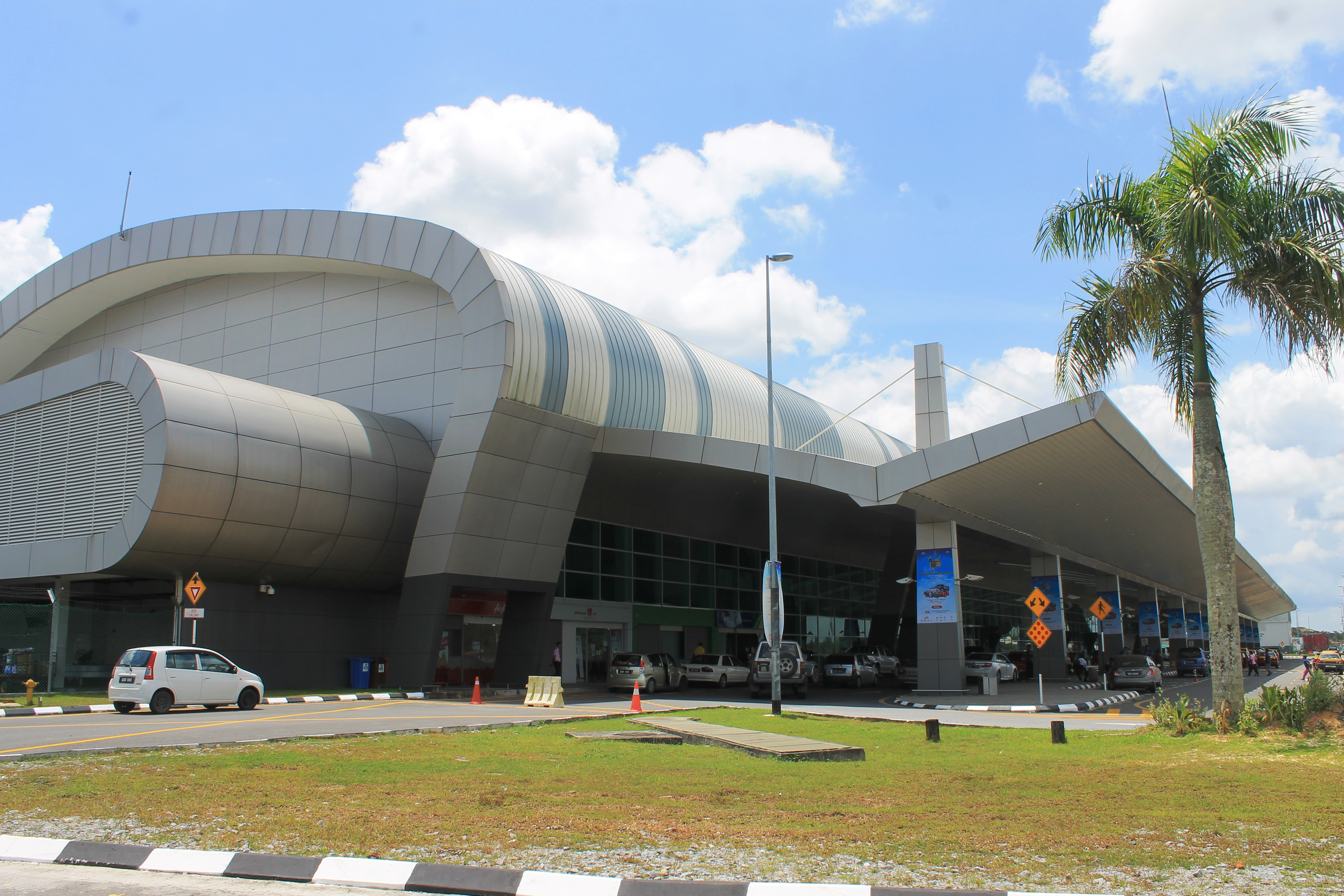
- IATA: SBW; ICAO: WBGS

Summary
- Airport type: Public
- Owner: Government of Malaysia
- Operator: Malaysia Airports Holdings Berhad
- Serves: Bintangor, Sarikei, Kapit, and Sibu, Sarawak, East Malaysia
- Location: Sibu, Sarawak, East Malaysia
- Time zone: MST (UTC+08:00)
- Elevation AMSL: 122 ft (37 m)
- Coordinates: 02°15′51″N 111°58′57″E

Maps
- Sarawak State in Malaysia

- Location in Sibu, Malaysia SBW /WBGS (East Malaysia) SBW /WBGS (Malaysia) SBW /WBGS (Southeast Asia) SBW /WBGS (Asia)

Runways
Direction	Length		Surface
Direction	m	ft	Surface
13/31	2,745	9,006	Asphalt

Statistics (2025)
- Passenger: 1,577,894 (▲25.4%)
- Airfreight (tonnes): 2,214 (▼14.0%)
- Aircraft movements: 14,882 (▲12.3%)
- Sources: official website AIP Malaysia

Sibu Airport (IATA: SBW, ICAO: WBGS) is an airport located 23 km (14 mi) east south east of Sibu, a town in the state of Sarawak in Malaysia. In 2018, the airport handled 1,579,528 passengers on 20,869 flights and also handled 1,443 metric tonnes of cargo. The airport is the 11th busiest airport in Malaysia, and the 3rd busiest in Sarawak in terms of passengers handled.

In April 2009, the airport was given RM 150 million for an upgrade of the terminal building. On 23 September 2010, Sarawak Minister of Finance and Public Health, Dato' Sri Wong Soon Koh had announced that the expansion project would commence.

The upgraded terminal started its operation on 31 July 2012. The airport terminal is the third largest airport terminal in Sarawak after Kuching International Airport and Miri International Airport, with a total terminal floor space of 15,240 m^{2}.

== History ==
=== First Airport: 1952-1994 ===
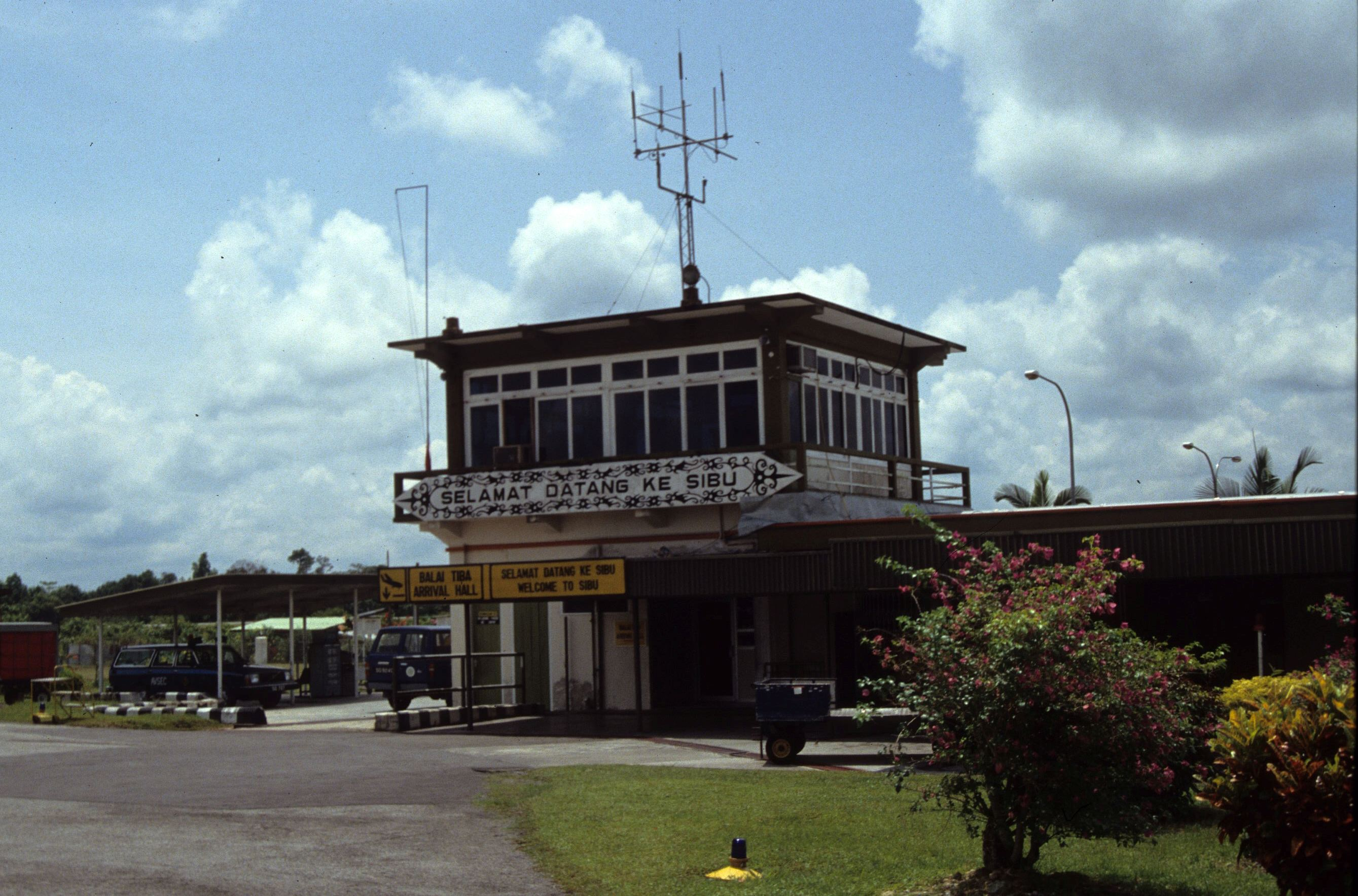
The former Sibu Airport control tower in 1992

The first airport in Sibu was built in Teku, during World War II by the Japanese as a basic air strip. However, the airstrip was heavily bombed by Allied Forces. Reconstruction work on the airport began in 1951. Initially, the runway was constructed at 3,600 feet by 150 feet. First plane landed at the airport on 21 May 1952. The airport opened to regular service on 1 July 1952. Malayan Airways did transit flights from Singapore to Kuching, Sibu and stop at Labuan on every Tuesdays. This was followed by transit flights of the same aircraft follow the same route back to Singapore on the next day. Another flight was operated by Douglas Dakota from Singapore to Kuching, Sibu, and stopped at North Borneo on Fridays. The same flight would follow the same route back to Singapore on the next day. The runway was extended to 4,500 feet by 150 feet in 1959.

On 15 August 1990, a Lockheed C-130H Hercules belonging to the Royal Malaysian Air Force skidded off the runway and the aircraft had been written off. It was believed that those on board are part of the royal entourage visit to Sibu.

On 2 September 1992, a Fokker 50 aircraft landing gear failed, causing the aircraft to veer off the runway and into the bushes.

The old airport has been demolished to make way for Laila Taib College (formerly known as UCS-United College of Sarawak) and Tun Zaidi Stadium. The runway of the old airport can still be seen and half of it is used as the connecting road for the stadium.

=== Current Airport: 1994-present ===
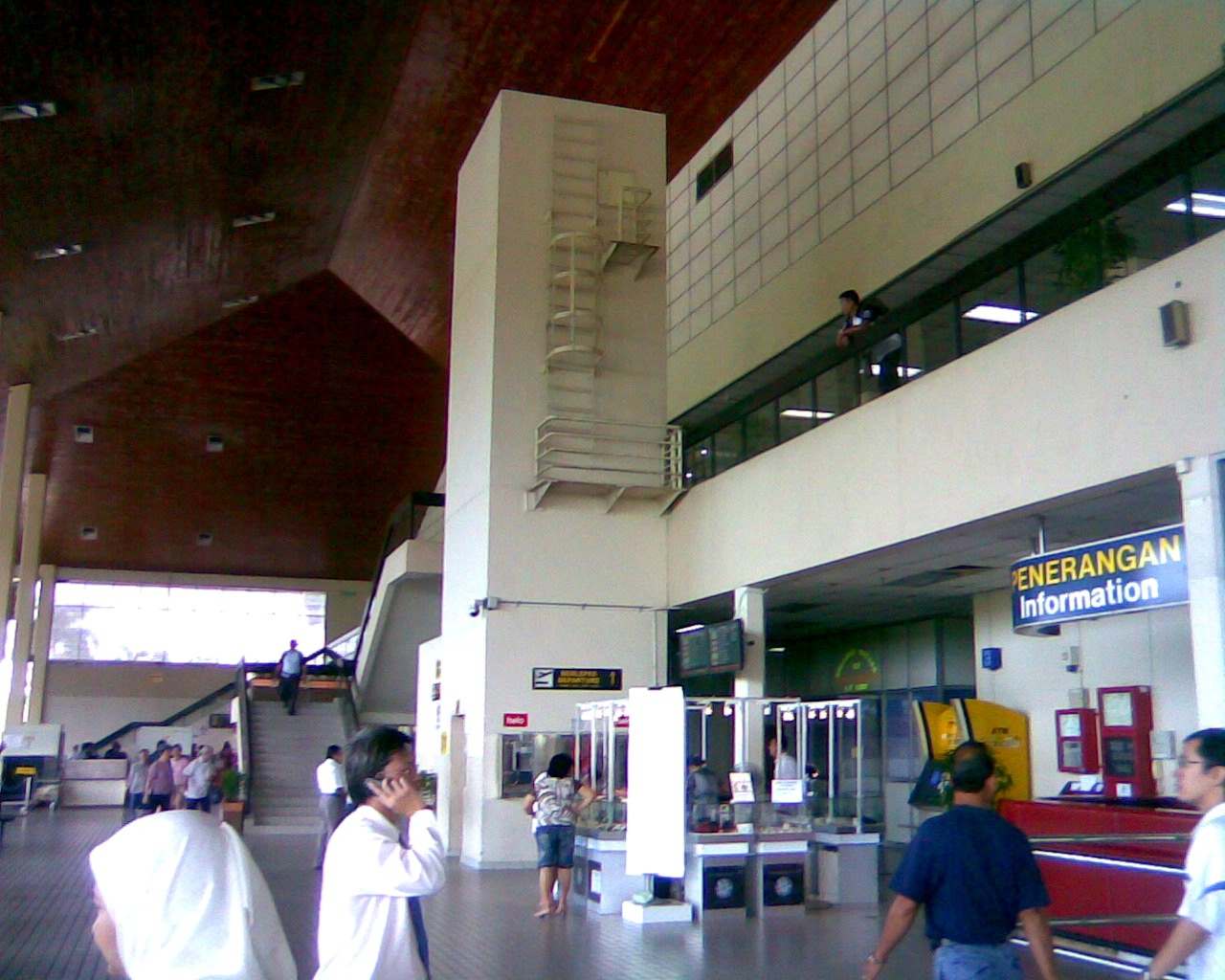
Interior of Sibu Airport in 2009

Operation of the new airport officially began on 1 June 1994. The airport is located at 23 km away from the town of Sibu. On 31 May 1994, four Malaysia Airlines aircraft performed inaugural landings. The aircraft were three Fokker 50 and a Boeing 737. The airport was built with a single runway, designated as Runway 13/Runway 31. The runway at that time measured 1,981 m × 45 m (6,499 ft × 148 ft). Runway 13 was equipped with approach lighting system known as "Precision Approach Lighting Category 1", while Runway 31 was equipped with "Simple Approach Lighting System". Airside areas such as taxiways and airport apron are also equipped with lightning systems. The maximum capacity of the parking apron was one Airbus, two Boeing 737-400s, two Fokker 50 and two Twin Otter or similar aircraft. Only Bay 2 and 3 were equipped with aerobridges.

The runway was later extended to 2,745 metres and commissioned for use on 9 May 2006 to accommodate the landing of Airbus.

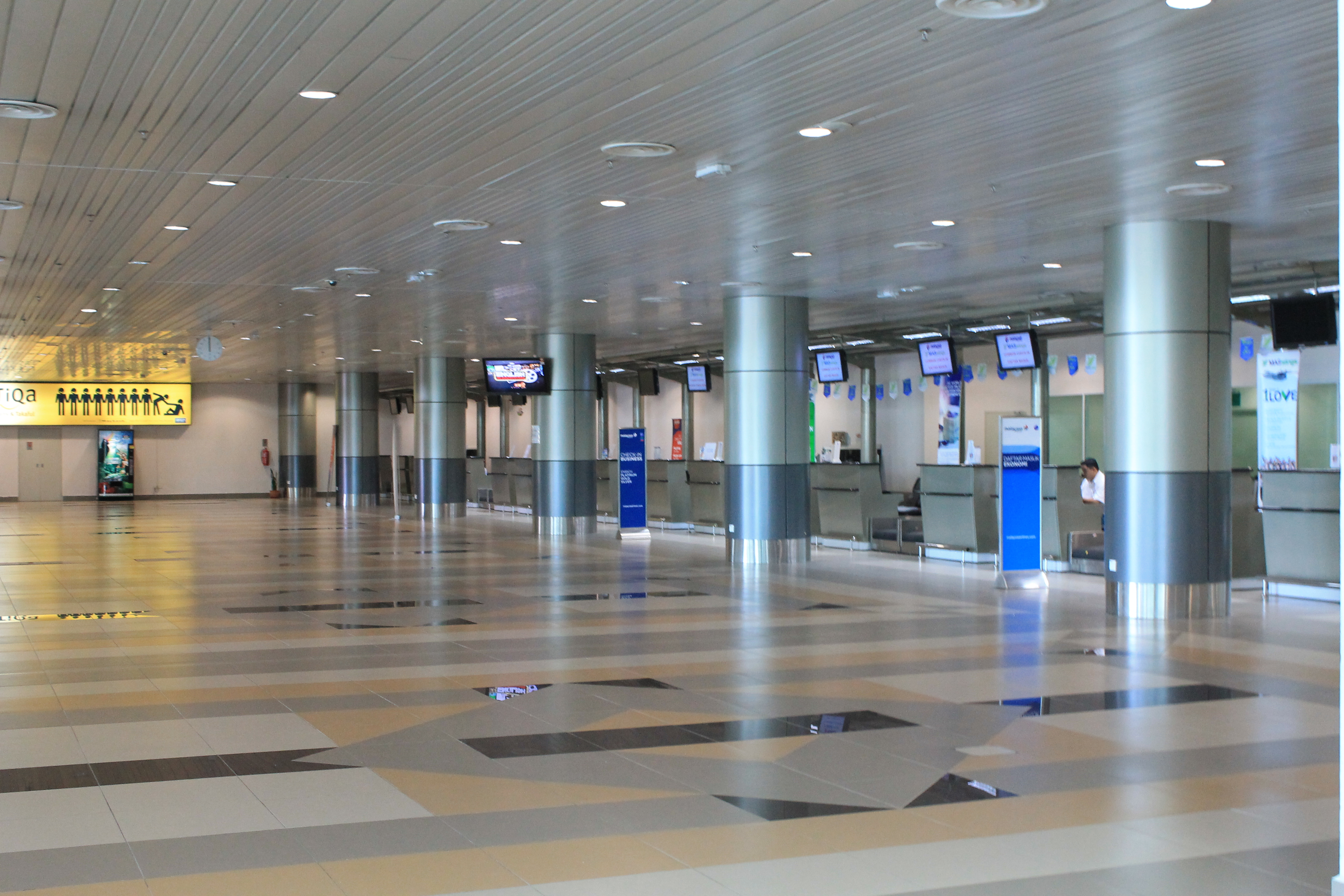
The check-in counters in 2013 after upgrade completion

In September 2010, an expansion project was underway to upgrade the terminal building and car park with the addition of more aerobridges. This upgrade increases the capacity of the airport into handling 1.9 million passengers annually. The cost of the upgrade was RM130 million. Brand new check-in counters of the airport were opened on 19 December 2011. The upgraded Sibu Airport was inaugurated on 16 September 2012.

On 29 September 2014, a Singaporean training aircraft Beechcraft King Air C90B skidded off the runway during touchdown. No one was injured during the incident.

On 8 April 2017, Malaysia Airlines Flight 2718, operated by Boeing 737-800 9M-MXX, overran the runway on landing. The nose gear collapsed. All 67 people on board survived. The incident resulted in Sibu Airport closure until 10 April, and left 1,413 passengers were affected cancellations and delays of flights. The airport was closed on 13 August 2019 to repair faulty lights on the runway. A total of 12 flights operated by MASwings and AirAsia were cancelled. The airport resumed normal operation on the next day.

== Airlines and destinations ==
=== Passenger ===
Airlines	Destinations
AirAsia	Johor Bahru, Kota Kinabalu, Kuala Lumpur–International, Kuching
AirBorneo	Bintulu, Miri, Mukah
Batik Air Malaysia	Kuala Lumpur–InternationalKuala Lumpur–Subang(begins 1 December 2026),
Firefly	Kuala Lumpur–International
Malaysia Airlines	Kuala Lumpur–International
Scoot	Singapore
Bhutan Airlines	Seasonal Charter: Paro

=== Cargo ===
Airlines	Destinations
World Cargo Airlines	Kuala Lumpur–International, Kuching

== Statistics ==
=== Traffic ===
Annual passenger numbers and aircraft statistics
Year	Passengers handled	Passenger % change	Cargo (tonnes)	Cargo % change	Aircraft movements	Aircraft % change
1995	624,738	Steady	2,455	Steady	18,905	Steady
1996	654,785	▲4.81	1,758	▼28.39	20,243	▲7.08
1997	631,701	▼3.53	1,904	▲8.30	19,551	▼3.42
1998	555,483	▼12.07	1,499	▼21.27	17,099	▼12.54
1999	620,830	▲11.76	1,745	▲16.41	16,096	▼5.87
2000	657,375	▲5.89	1,874	▲7.39	15,743	▼2.19
2001	725,449	▲10.36	2,006	▲7.04	16,995	▲7.95
2002	759,704	▲4.72	1,916	▼4.49	17,113	▲0.69
2003	817,687	▲7.63	1,701	▼11.22	16,885	▼1.33
2004	903,108	▲10.45	1,567	▼7.88	17,650	▲4.53
2005	920,930	▲1.97	1,377	▼12.13	17,330	▼1.81
2006	898,923	▼2.39	1,040	▼24.47	15,638	▼9.76
2007	809,955	▼9.90	892	▼14.23	12,536	▼19.84
2008	831,772	▲2.70	735	▼17.50	14,672	▲17.00
2009	939,732	▲12.98	856	▲16.46	17,449	▲18.93
2010	1,009,002	▲7.40	1,133	▲32.35	18,985	▲8.80
2011	1,133,903	▲12.29	1,153	▲1.77	18,211	▼4.08
2012	1,204,267	▲6.2	1,612	▲39.8	15,923	▼12.56
2013	1,383,887	▲14.9	1,413	▼12.3	17,196	▲8.0
2014	1,440,935	▲4.1	1,460	▲3.3	22,508	▲30.9
2015	1,454,360	▲0.9	1,304	▼10.7	21,172	▲5.9
2016	1,469,341	▲1.0	1,048	▼19.6	24,806	▲14.6
2017	1,497,412	▲1.9	1,285	▲22.6	18,598	▼25.0
2018	1,579,528	▲5.5	1,443	▲12.2	20,869	▲12.2
2019	1,750,876	▲10.9	1,259	▼12.8	16,748	▼19.7
2020	569,625	▼67.5	1,406	▲11.7	7,122	▼54.5
2021	242,451	▼57.4	1,633	▲16.1	3,523	▼50.5
2022	1,234,473	▲409.2	3,027	▲85.4	12,008	▲240.8
2023	1,548,423	▲25.4	2,214	▼26.9	13,603	▲13.3
2024	1,459,036	▼5.7	1,993	▼9.9	13,248	▼2.6
2025	1,577,894	▲8.1	1,714	▼14.0	14,882	▲12.3
^{Source: Ministry of Transport (Malaysia)}

=== Flight statistics ===
Busiest domestic flights out of Sibu Airport by frequency as of November 2025
Rank	Destinations	Frequency (weekly)	Airlines
1	Kuala Lumpur	56	AirAsia, Malaysia Airlines, Batik Air Malaysia, Firefly
2	Kuching, Sarawak	32	AirAsia
3	Miri, Sarawak	21	MASwings
4	Johor Bahru, Johor	13	AirAsia
5	Kota Kinabalu, Sabah	7	AirAsia
5	Bintulu, Sarawak	7	MASwings
7	Mukah, Sarawak	3	MASwings
7	Singapore	3	Scoot

Traffic movements between Sibu Airport
From	To	2008	2009	2010	2011	2012	2013	2014	2015	2016	2017	2018
Sibu	Kuala Lumpur	167,582	185,734	216,571	227,381	247,624	301,394	309,103	325,257	344,863	359,836	368,803
Kuala Lumpur	Sibu	169,787	187,536	218,651	232,530	246,075	300,070	308,265	326,003	345,427	364,552	365,752
Sibu	Kuching	35,136	156,361	167,033	206,421	215,094	233,064	239,622	236,735	226,719	232,813	260,446
Kuching	Sibu	32,801	153,711	162,872	198,833	216,898	230,304	236,371	238,600	228,843	234,019	259,492
Sibu	Miri	31,926	32,177	32,318	4,718	51,570	53,761	58,522	50,756	50,778	45,114	46,510
Miri	Sibu	26,028	32,730	32,941	4,443	49,469	52,265	56,179	50,498	51,091	44,648	47,214
Sibu	Bintulu	5,402	10,358	12,973	16,888	10,687	10,524	12,192	10,466	10,576	10,570	11,829
Bintulu	Sibu	1,263	784	106	12,831	13,881	10,396	11,383	11,568	11,407	10,104	11,274
Sibu	KotaKinabalu	18,340	47,365	40,133	38,319	35,227	34,961	35,808	34,993	34,832	31,986	30,497
KotaKinabalu	Sibu	28,549	48,234	40,101	42,413	42,690	36,485	38,166	34,826	34,337	33,027	29,674
^{Source: Malaysia Airports Holdings Berhad}

Sector traffic movements between Sibu Airport
Sector	2008	2009	2010	2011	2012	2013	2014	2015	2016	2017	2018
Sibu<->KualaLumpur	337,369	373,270	435,222	459,911	493,699	601,464	617,368	651,260	690,290	724,388	734,555
Sibu<->Kuching	67,937	310,072	329,905	405,254	431,992	463,368	475,993	475,335	455,562	466,832	519,938
Sibu<->Miri	57,954	64,907	65,259	9,161	101,039	106,026	114,701	101,254	101,869	89,762	93,724
Sibu<->Bintulu	6,665	11,142	13,079	29,719	24,568	20,920	23,575	22,034	21,983	20,674	23,103
Sibu<->KotaKinabalu	46,889	95,599	80,234	80,732	77,917	71,446	73,974	69,819	69,169	65,013	60,171
^{Source: Malaysia Airports Holdings Berhad}
