= Sayani =

Sayani ساياني
- Village
- Location within Iran
- Coordinates: 25°39′32″N 60°58′24″E
- Country: Iran
- Province: Sistan and Baluchestan
- County: Chabahar
- Bakhsh: Central
- Rural District: Pir Sohrab

Population (2006)
  - Total: 367
- Time zone: UTC+3:30 (IRST)
  - Summer (DST): UTC+4:30 (IRDT)

Sayani (Persian: ساياني, also Romanized as Sāyānī; also known as Sīānī) is a village in Pir Sohrab Rural District, in the Central District of Chabahar County, Sistan and Baluchestan Province, Iran. At the 2006 census, its population was 367, in 65 families.
