= Siani (surname) =

Siani is an Italian surname. Notable people with the surname include:

- Alessandro Siani (born 1975), Italian actor, film director, screenwriter and comedian
- Giancarlo Siani (1959–1985), Italian journalist
- Giorgio Siani (born 1997), Italian footballer
- Melvin Siani (born 2004), Canadian football player
- Mike Siani (American football) (born 1950), American football wide receiver
- Mike Siani (baseball) (born 1999), American baseball outfielder
- Sabrina Siani (born 1963), Italian actress
- Sammy Siani (born 2000), American baseball player
- Sébastien Siani (born 1986), Cameroonian footballer
- Valentino Siani (c. 1595 – 1672), Italian luthier
