= Sinai =

Sinai commonly refers to:

- Sinai Peninsula, Egypt
- Mount Sinai, a mountain in the Sinai Peninsula, Egypt
- Biblical Mount Sinai, the site in the Bible where Moses received the Law of God, often identified with the above

Sinai may also refer to:

- Sinai, South Dakota, a place in the United States
- Sinai (surname), including a list of people and fictional characters with the name
- Sinai (Noguchi), a sculpture by Isamu Noguchi
- Sinai, a game by SPI
- Sinai, a 19th-century monthly Jewish magazine in German by David Einhorn
- Sinai, a Hebrew-language academic journal (1937–2020)
- Sinai School, a Jewish primary school in London, England
- Sinai, one of two tram cars on the Angels Flight funicular in Los Angeles, U.S.

== See also ==
- Mount Sinai (disambiguation)
- Temple Sinai (disambiguation)
- Sinai Hospital (disambiguation)
- Saini, a caste of North India
- Shenoy, a surname sometime written as "Sinai" in Goa, India
- Siani (disambiguation)
- Sin (mythology)
- Sina (disambiguation)
- Sinnai, a place in Sardinia
