= Senai International Airport =

Airport serving Johor Bahru, Malaysia

Senai International Airport Lapangan Terbang Antarabangsa Senai

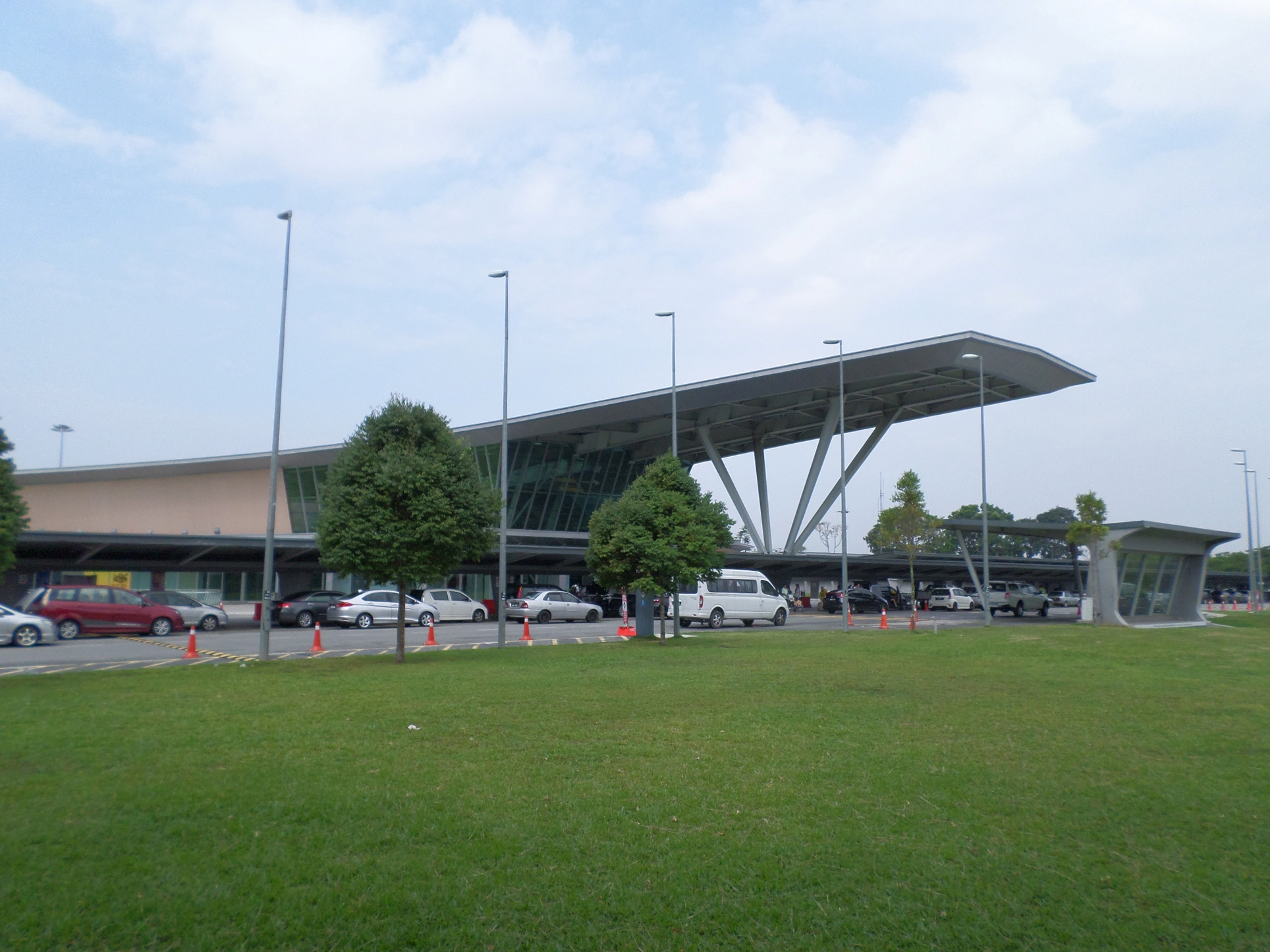
- IATA: JHB; ICAO: WMKJ

Summary
- Airport type: Public
- Owner: MMC Corporation Berhad
- Operator: Senai Airport Terminal Services Sdn Bhd
- Serves: Johor Bahru; Iskandar Malaysia
- Location: Senai, Kulai District, Johor, Malaysia
- Opened: 1974; 52 years ago
- Operating base for: AirAsia
- Time zone: MST (UTC+08:00)
- Elevation AMSL: 127 ft (39 m)
- Coordinates: 01°38′26″N 103°40′13″E
- Website: www.senaiairport.com

Maps
- Johor state in Malaysia

- Location in Senai, Kulai, Johor, West Malaysia JHB/WMKJ (Peninsular Malaysia) JHB/WMKJ (Malaysia) JHB/WMKJ (Southeast Asia) JHB/WMKJ (Asia)

Runways
Direction	Length		Surface
Direction	m	ft	Surface
16/34	3,800	12,467	Asphalt

Statistics (2024)
- Passengers: 3,360,906 (▲11.7%)
- Domestic passengers: 2,702,307 (▲21.8%)
- International passengers: 658,599 (▲58.1%)
- Aircraft movements: 58,758 (▲39.9%)
- Cargo (tonnes): 80,000 (▲30.7%)(2024)
- Sources: AIP Malaysia

Senai International Airport (IATA: JHB, ICAO: WMKJ), formerly known as Sultan Ismail International Airport or simply Sultan Ismail Airport, is an international airport serving Johor Bahru District, Malaysia's second most populous district and other regions in southern Peninsular Malaysia. Located in Kulai of the Malaysian state of Johor, it is approximately 22 km northwest of the Johor Bahru city centre. The airport is adjacent to Sedenak Tech Park, the largest data centre hub in Malaysia.

== History ==
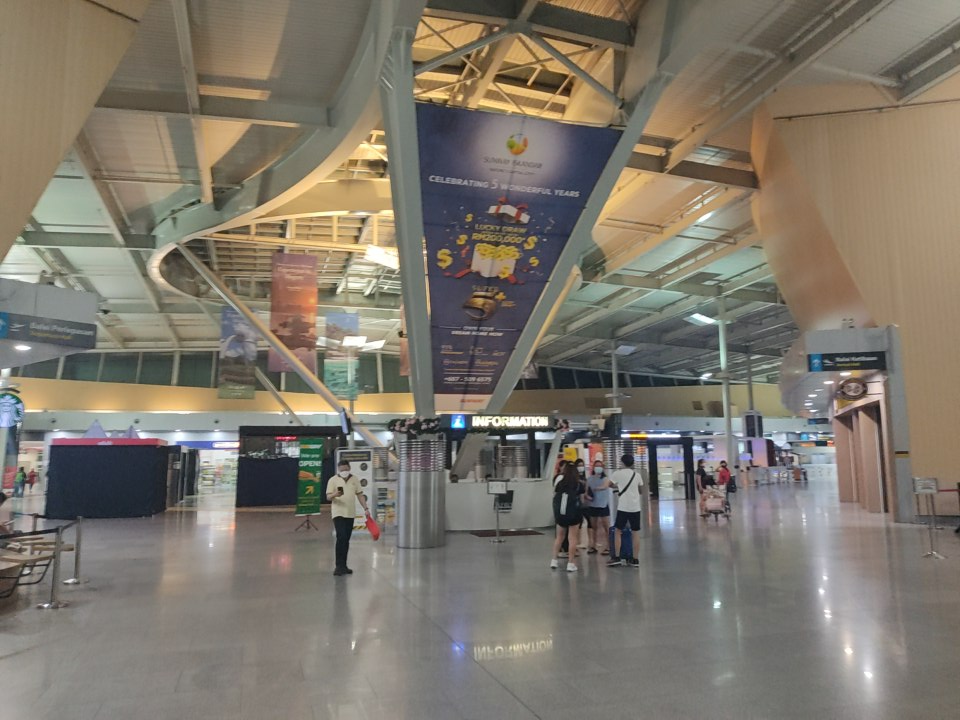
Senai airport interior

Plans for expanding the airport were announced in 1978.

The federal government planned to upgrade the airport in 1990, costing RM 100 million. It was approved in April 1990.

Meanwhile, Malaysia Airlines' planned to reroute its international flights to the airport instead of Singapore Changi as it is cheaper. The plan was approved in August 1991.

In September 1990, Malaysia Airlines began adding direct flights from the airport to Kuala Terengganu attract tourists to Terengganu and Kelantan.

In April 1992, Malaysia Airlines began weekly flights from Senai to Hong Kong, marking "a new era" for the airport.

In 1993, Senai Airport was upgraded, costing RM 93 million. The upgrade works include expansions to the terminal and runway, and the construction of an aerobridge. The upgrade would enable the airport to carry more McDonnell Douglas DC-10 aircraft than before, with traffic increased to 100 flights weekly.

A further expansion of the airport, costing RM 84.5 million, was completed in April 1998. The expansion enabled the airport to connect to more Asian cities.

In 2019, Senai International Airport handled a total of 4,254,922 passengers and 15,010 tons of freight with a combination of 52,030 scheduled and non-scheduled commercial aircraft movements. Currently the terminal is being expanded to handle 5 million passengers by 2023.

== Airlines and destinations ==
=== Passenger ===
Airlines	Destinations
AirAsia	Alor Setar, Guangzhou, Ho Chi Minh City, Ipoh, Kota Bharu, Kota Kinabalu, Kuala Lumpur–International, Kuching, Kunming, Langkawi, Sibu, Tawau
Batik Air Malaysia	Bangkok–Don Mueang, Kuala Lumpur–Subang, Penang
Firefly	Haikou, Kuala Lumpur–International, Kuala Lumpur–Subang
Malaysia Airlines	Kuala Lumpur–International
Indonesia AirAsia	Jakarta–Soekarno-Hatta, Surabaya
Thai AirAsia	Bangkok–Don Mueang

== Statistics ==
Annual passenger numbers and aircraft statistics
Year	Passengers handled	Passenger % change	Cargo (tonnes)	Cargo % change	Aircraft movements	Aircraft % change
2009	1,316,082	Steady	N/A	Steady	N/A	Steady
2010	1,235,400	▼6.1	6,239	Steady	11,934	Steady
2011	1,337,562	▲8.3	5,438	▼12.8	15,167	▲27.1
2012	1,376,383	▲3.0	3,149	▼42.1	12,506	▼17.4
2013	1,989,979	▲44.6	3,443	▲9.3	37,998	▲203.8
2014	2,325,816	▲16.9	4,934	▲43.3	42,976	▲13.1
2015	2,581,966	▲11.1	5,272	▲6.9	41,892	▼2.5
2016	2,828,074	▲12.1	6,245	▲18.0	42,744	▲2.0
2017	3,124,799	▲10.5	7,614	▲21.9	46,497	▲3.0
2018	3,522,519	▲12.7	9,691	▲27.0	52,030	▲12.0
2019	4,270,144	▲21.2	14,694	▲51.6	58,313	▲12.1
2020	1,096,517	▼74.3	10,120	▼31.1	21,481	▼63.2
2021	371,754	▼33.4	10,120	▼31.1	21,481	▼63.2
2022	2,144,036	▲476.7	10,120	▼31.1	21,481	▼63.2
2023	3,010,000	▲71.23	10,120	▼31.1	42,000	▲63.2
^{Source: Ministry of Transport}

Busiest domestic flights out of Senai International Airport by frequency as of September 2023
Rank	Destinations	Frequency (weekly)	Airlines
1	Kuala Lumpur, Kuala Lumpur	76	AK, MH, OD
2	Penang, Pulau Pinang	29	AK, FY
3	Subang, Selangor	26	FY, OD
4	Kuching, Sarawak	21	AK
5	Kota Kinabalu, Sabah	18	AK
6	Sibu, Sarawak	7	AK
7	Ipoh, Perak	7	AK
8	Langkawi, Kedah	4	AK
9	Alor Setar, Kedah	4	AK
10	Tawau, Sabah	4	AK
11	Kota Bharu, Kelantan	3	AK
12	Miri, Sarawak	3	AK

Busiest international flights out of Senai International Airport by frequency as of September 2023
Rank	Destinations	Frequency (weekly)	Airlines
1	Jakarta–Soekarno Hatta, Indonesia	18	QZ, 8B
2	Bangkok–Don Mueang, Thailand	18	FD, OD
3	Ho Chi Minh City, Vietnam	7	AK
4	Guangzhou, China	7	AK
5	Surabaya, Indonesia	4	QZ
6	Kunming, China	2	OD
7	Medina, Saudi Arabia	1	MH

== Ground transportation ==
Senai International Airport is connected to PLUS Highway, Senai–Desaru Expressway and Second Link Expressway, which are directly linked to Port of Tanjung Pelepas, the 15th busiest port in the world. The nearest train station is the Kulai railway station, connecting to the rest of Malaysia. Taxis are available outside the airport. Additionally, public and private buses are available to the Johor Bahru city centre with the option to transit to Singapore.

Causeway Link also provides the commuters a shuttle bus route to JB Sentral.

Bus no.	Destinations
AA1	JB Sentral

== Senai Business Aviation Terminal (SBAT) ==
SATSSB also operates SBAT, a private aviation terminal located just beside the airport's main terminal building and sharing the same infrastructure. True to its name, SBAT features business facilities including meeting and conference rooms, and dining and private rest facilities.

== Senai Airport Free Industrial Zone (SAFIZ) ==
SAFIZ forms part of Senai International Airport's total land area and operates as a free industrial zone with factories and distribution hubs for many multinational corporations, including Mercedes-Benz, Pokka, Dyson, Celestica and BMW.

== See also ==
- Johor Bahru District
- Kulai District
- Iskandar Malaysia Special Economic Zone
