= List of airports by ICAO code: W =

List of airports by ICAO code: A - B - C - D - EB-EG - EH-EY - FA-FM - FN-FZ - G - H - ~~I~~ - J - KA-KH - KI-KP - KR-KZ - LA-LJ - LK-LZ - M - N - O - P - Q - R - SA-SC - SD-SH - SI - SJ - SK-SM - SN-SP - SQ - SS-SU - SV-SY - T - U - V - W - ~~X~~ - Y - Z

== WA, WI, WR - Indonesia ==
Also see airport category and list.

ICAO	IATA	Airport name	Community	Coordinates	Notes
WAAA	UPG	Sultan Hasanuddin International Airport	Makassar, South Sulawesi	05°03′42″S 119°33′15″E	
WAAJ	MJU	Tampa Padang Airport	Mamuju, West Sulawesi	02°35′12″S 119°01′45″E	
WABA	WET	Waghete Baru Airport	Deiyai	04°04′03″S 136°16′25″E	
WABB	BIK	Frans Kaisiepo Airport	Biak, Papua	01°11′24″S 136°06′27″E	
WABC		Siriwo Airport	Siriwo	03°32′19″S 135°56′57″E	
WABD	ONI	Moanamani Airport	Moanamani	04°00′25″S 136°02′14″E	
WABE		Duma Airport	Duma	04°04′20″S 136°42′50″E	
WABF	FOO	Kornasoren Airport	Numfor	00°56′11″S 134°52′19″E	
WABG		Kasonaweja Airport	Kasonaweja	02°18′03″S 138°01′58″E	
WABI	NBX	Douw Aturure Airport	Nabire	03°24′03″S 135°23′48″E	
WABK		Biri Airport	Biri	02°52′41″S 137°46′05″E	
WABL		Kustera Airport	Kustera	02°44′48″S 137°55′12″E	
WABM	BXM	Batom Airport	Batom	04°26′34″S 140°53′03″E	
WABN		Bareri Airport	Mamberamo Raya	02°58′56″S 137°46′57″E	Closed
WABO	ZRI	Stevanus Rumbewas Airport	Serui	01°49′44″S 136°03′51″E	
WABP	TIM	Mozes Kilangin Airport	Timika	04°31′45″S 136°53′12″E	
WABQ		Danau Bira Airport	Mamberamo Raya	02°27′59″S 138°00′58″E	Closed
WABR		Daufo Airport	Daufo	03°10′25″S 137°15′13″E	
WABS	NKD	Sinak Airport	Puncak	03°49′19″S 137°50′17″E	
WABU		Manuhua Airport	Biak	01°10′22″S 136°04′52″E	
WABV		Derapos Airport	Waropen	02°58′26″S 137°13′24″E	
WABX		Apogomacida Airport	Dogiyai	04°03′48″S 135°33′36″E	
WADA	AMI	Selaparang Airport	Mataram, West Nusa Tenggara	08°33′38″S 116°05′39″E	Closed
WADB	BMU	Sultan Muhammad Salahuddin Airport	Bima	08°32′23″S 118°41′14″E	
WADD	DPS	Ngurah Rai International Airport	Denpasar, Bali	08°44′53″S 115°10′03″E	
WADE	WSN	Lt. Col. Wisnu Airfield	Buleleng	08°08′22″S 114°36′57″E	
WADL	LOP	Lombok International Airport	Praya, Lombok	08°45′29″S 116°16′35″E	
WADS	SWQ	Sultan Muhammad Kaharuddin III Airport	Sumbawa, West Nusa Tenggara	08°29′19″S 117°24′51″E	
WADT	PNW	Amman Mineral Poto Tano Airoprt	West Sumbawa	08°35′39″S 116°47′33″E	
WADU		Lunyuk Airport	Lunyuk	08°59′22″S 117°12′57″E	
WADY	BWX	Banyuwangi Airport	Banyuwangi, East Java	08°18′36″S 114°20′25″E	
WAEA		Mahak Baru Airport	Malinau	01°24′25″N 115°20′03″E	
WAEB		Marimoi Airport	North Halmahera	01°06′06″N 127°42′08″E	
WAEE	TTE	Sultan Babullah Airport	Ternate, North Maluku	00°49′55″N 127°22′50″E	
WAEG	GLX	Gamar Malamo Airport	Galela	01°50′14″N 127°47′08″E	Formerly WAMA
WAEH	WDB	Weda Bay Airport	Central Weda, Central Halmahera, North Maluku	00°28′04″N 127°56′59″E	
WAEJ	GEB	Gebe Airport	Gebe	00°04′35″S 129°27′39″E	
WAEK	KAZ	Kuabang Airport	Kao	01°11′14″N 127°53′45″E	Formerly WAMK
WAEL	LAH	Oesman Sadik Airport	Labuha	00°38′14″S 127°30′03″E	
WAEM	PGQ	Buli Airport	Buli	00°55′03″N 128°22′59″E	
WAEO	MAL	Mangole Airport	Mangole Island	01°46′57″S 125°28′55″E	
WAES	SQN	Emalamo Airport	Sanana	02°05′59″S 125°57′57″E	
WAEW	OTI	Pitu Airport	Morotai, North Maluku	02°02′46″N 128°19′29″E	Formerly WAMR
WAFB	TRT	Toraja Airport	Tana Toraja Regency, South Sulawesi	03°11′09″S 119°55′04″E	
WAFD	LLO	Bua Airport	Palopo	03°05′05″S 120°14′43″E	
WAFF	PLW	Mutiara SIS Al-Jufrie Airport	Palu, Central Sulawesi	00°55′07″S 119°54′35″E	
WAFJ	MJU	Tampa Padang Airport	Mamuju	02°35′22″S 119°01′32″E	
WAFK		Rampi Airport	Rampi	02°07′32″S 120°17′50″E	
WAFL	TLI	Sultan Bantilan Airport	Tolitoli	01°07′25″N 120°47′35″E	Formerly WAMI
WAFM	MXB	Andi Jemma Airport	Masamba	02°33′35″S 120°19′50″E	Formerly WAAM and WAWM
WAFN	SKO	Seko Airport	Seko	02°16′17″S 119°53′42″E	
WAFO	MOH	Maleo Airport	Morowali, Central Sulawesi	02°12′12″S 121°39′37″E	
WAFP	PSJ	Kasiguncu Airport	Poso, Central Sulawesi	01°25′00″S 120°39′28″E	Formerly WAMP
WAFQ	BQR	Maulana Prins Mandapar Airport	Banggai Sea	01°33′15″S 123°32′39″E	
WAFS		Sumarorong Airport	Sumarorong	03°09′01″S 119°18′08″E	
WAFT	TTR	Pongtiku Airport	Tana Toraja	03°02′33″S 119°49′15″E	Closed
WAFU	OJU	Tanjung Api Airport	Ampana	00°51′52″S 121°37′23″E	
WAFW	LUW	Syukuran Aminuddin Amir Airport	Luwuk, Central Sulawesi	01°02′20″S 122°46′19″E	
WAFY	UOL	Pogogul Airport	Buol	01°06′03″N 121°24′58″E	
WAFZ	PWX	Panua Pohuwato Airport	Pohuwato	00°27′53″N 121°49′06″E	
WAGA	GXM	Kuala Kurun Airport	Kuala Kurun	01°07′42″S 113°52′26″E	Formerly WRBD
WAGB	HMS	Haji Muhammad Sidik Airport	Trinsing, South Teweh, North Barito Regency, Central Kalimantan	01°01′29″S 114°55′40″E	
WAGF	KLP	Seruyan Kuala Pembuang Airport	Kuala Pembuang	03°22′35″S 112°32′13″E	
WAGG	PKY	Tjilik Riwut Airport	Palangka Raya, Central Kalimantan	02°13′30″S 113°56′33″E	
WAGI	PKN	Iskandar Airport	Pangkalan Bun	02°42′18″S 111°40′23″E	
WAGM	NGG	Sanggu Airport	Sanggu	01°40′09″S 114°53′52″E	
WAGP		Dirung Lingkin Airport	Puruk Cahu	00°41′19″S 114°26′41″E	
WAGS	SMQ	H. Asan Airport	Sampit	02°29′57″S 112°58′30″E	
WAGT	TBM	Tumbang Samba Airport	Tumbang Samba	01°28′07″S 113°04′51″E	
WAGU		Byan Airport	Tabang	00°33′03″N 116°06′03″E	
WAHH	JOG	Adisutjipto Airport	Yogyakarta, Special Region of Yogyakarta	07°47′17″S 110°25′54″E	
WAHI	YIA	Yogyakarta International Airport	Kulon Progo Regency, Special Region of Yogyakarta	07°54′27″S 110°03′16″E	
WAHL	CXP	Tunggul Wulung Airport	Cilacap	07°38′42″S 109°02′03″E	Formerly WIHL
WAHP	PWL	General Sudirman Airport	Bukateja, Purbalingga	07°27′42″S 109°25′00″E	
WAHQ	SOC	Adisoemarmo International Airport (Adi Sumarmo Wiryokusumo)	Surakarta (Solo), Central Java	07°30′58″S 110°45′25″E	
WAHS	SRG	Jenderal Ahmad Yani International Airport	Semarang, Central Java	06°58′17″S 110°22′27″E	
WAHU	KWB	Dewadaru Airport	Karimunjawa	05°48′04″S 110°28′43″E	
WAJA	ARJ	Arso Airport	Arso	02°56′00″S 140°47′00″E	Coordinates unverified
WAJC	DRH	Dabra Airport	Dabra	03°16′13″S 138°36′48″E	
WAJD		Wakde Airport	Sarmi	01°56′20″S 139°01′10″E	
WAJF		Ambisibil Airport	Pegunungan Bintang	04°40′17″S 140°34′28″E	
WAJH		Bime Airport	Bime	04°29′09″S 140°13′12″E	
WAJI	ZRM	Orai Airport	Sarmi	01°52′24″S 138°45′13″E	
WAJJ	DJJ	Sentani International Airport	Jayapura, Papua	02°34′37″S 140°30′58″E	Formerly WABS
WAJK	KWR	Kiwirok Airport	Papua	04°42′48″S 140°44′25″E	
WAJL	LHI	Lereh Airport	Lereh	03°04′46″S 139°57′08″E	
WAJO	OKL	Oksibil Airport	Oksibil	04°54′28″S 140°37′46″E	
WAJP		Oklip Airport	Pegunungan Bintang	04°45′43″S 140°46′50″E	
WAJQ		Okbap Airport	Pegunungan Bintang	04°35′09″S 140°29′59″E	
WAJS	SEH	Senggeh Airport	Senggeh	03°26′33″S 140°46′40″E	
WAJT		Manggelum Airport	Manggelum	05°25′08″S 140°26′07″E	
WAJU	UBR	Ubrub Airport	Ubrub	03°40′32″S 140°53′00″E	
WAJV		Iwur Airport	Pegunungan Bintang	05°08′20″S 140°43′05″E	
WAJW		Okyap Airport	Pegunungan Bintang	04°44′36″S 140°50′54″E	
WAJY	WRR	Werur Airport	Werur	00°25′15″S 132°11′13″E	
WAKB		Aboge Airport	Aboge	06°03′48″S 139°16′01″E	Road airstrip
WAKC		Yaniruma Airport	Yaniruma	05°25′13″S 139°49′09″E	
WAKD	MDP	Mindiptana Airport	Mindiptana	05°52′45″S 140°42′31″E	
WAKE	BXD	Bade Airport	Bade	07°10′36″S 139°34′59″E	
WAKG	EWE	Ewer Airport	Joerat	05°29′42″S 138°04′51″E	
WAKJ	KMM	Kimaam Airport	Kimaam	07°58′46″S 138°51′12″E	
WAKK	MKQ	Mopah Airport	Merauke	08°31′13″S 140°25′06″E	
WAKL	BXQ	Bomakia Airport	Bomakia	05°48′25″S 139°52′04″E	
WAKM	KCD	Kamur Airport	Kamur	06°11′07″S 138°38′27″E	
WAKO	OKQ	Okaba Airport	Okaba	08°05′40″S 139°43′19″E	
WAKP	KEI	Kepi Airport	Kepi	06°32′30″S 139°19′54″E	
WAKQ	ZEG	Senggo Airport	Senggo	05°41′27″S 139°21′04″E	
WAKS		Amazu Airport	Amazu	05°36′41″S 139°37′21″E	
WAKT	TMH	Tanah Merah Airport	Tanahmerah	06°05′49″S 140°18′13″E	
WAKW		Mina Wanam Airport	Wanam	07°32′26″S 139°06′39″E	
WAKY		Koroway Batu Airport	Danowage	05°12′50″S 140°01′24″E	
WALA	SGQ	Sangkimah Airport	Sangata	00°23′02″N 117°32′33″E	
WALB		Tanjung Bara Airport	East Kutai	00°33′38″N 117°38′40″E	
WALC	BXT	PT Badak Bontang Airport	Bontang	00°07′18″N 117°28′36″E	Formerly WRLC
WALE	GHS	Melalan Airport	Melak, East Kalimantan	00°12′14″S 115°45′36″E	
WALG		Bayan Kara Airport	Bulungan	02°43′08″N 117°07′44″E	
WALH	TNB	Tanah Grogot Airport	Tanah Grogot	01°53′16″S 116°15′20″E	
WALI		Berian Baru Airport	Nunukan	03°48′19″N 115°39′00″E	
WALJ	DTD	Datah Dawai Airport	Mahakam Ulu	00°48′37″N 114°31′49″E	
WALK	IVD	Nusantara International Airport	Nusantara, East Kalimantan	01°09′36″S 116°42′19″E	
WALL	BPN	Sultan Aji Muhammad Sulaiman Airport	Balikpapan, East Kalimantan	01°16′06″S 116°53′40″E	
WALN		Long Nawang Airport	Malinau	01°47′57″N 114°54′16″E	
WALO		Datah Dian Airport	Malinau	02°00′27″N 115°09′05″E	
WALQ		Pujangan Airport	Muara Badak	00°18′20″S 117°24′55″E	
WALS	AAP	Aji Pangeran Tumenggung Pranoto International Airport	Samarinda	00°22′25″S 117°15′20″E	
WALT	TSX	Tanjung Santan Airport	Tanjung Santan	00°05′36″S 117°26′21″E	Formerly WRLT
WALW		Muara Wahau Airport	Miau Baru	01°11′44″N 116°57′22″E	
WALX		Mangkajang Airport	Mangkajang	02°00′27″N 117°44′56″E	
WAMD		Kuripasai Airport	Jailolo	01°07′03″N 127°29′06″E	
WAMG	GTO	Djalaluddin Airport	Gorontalo	00°38′14″N 122°51′00″E	
WAMH	NAH	Naha Airport (Indonesia)	Sangihe Islands	03°40′59″N 125°31′40″E	
WAMI	LKM	Raja Loloda Mokoagow Airport	Bolaang Mongondow	00°53′19″S 124°01′19″E	
WAMM	MDC	Sam Ratulangi International Airport	Manado, North Sulawesi	01°32′57″N 124°55′35″E	
WAMN	MNA	Melangguane Airport	Melangguane	04°00′25″N 126°40′23″E	
WAMO	BRG	Siau Airport	Balirangen	02°38′55″N 125°25′24″E	
WAMP	MWS	Imip Airport	Morowali	02°48′05″S 122°08′28″E	
WAMQ		Pogogul Buol Airport	Pogogul Buol	01°06′10″N 121°24′44″E	
WAMS	IAX	Miangas Airport	Miangas	05°33′44″N 126°34′53″E	
WAOC	BTW	Batu Licin Airport	Batulicin	03°24′45″S 115°59′43″E	Formerly WRBC
WAOG		Sebuku Airport	Kotabaru	03°37′35″S 116°22′12″E	
WAOH		Mekar Putih Airport	Mekar Putih	03°59′24″S 116°06′06″E	
WAOK	KBU	Gusti Syamsir Alam Airport	Kotabaru Hilir, South Kalimantan	03°17′45″S 116°09′51″E	Formerly WRBK
WAOM	MTW	Beringin Airport	Muara Teweh	00°56′30″S 114°53′34″E	Closed
WAON	TJG	Warukin Airport	Tabalong, South Kalimantan	02°12′46″S 115°26′33″E	
WAOO	BDJ	Syamsudin Noor International Airport	Banjarmasin, South Kalimantan	03°26′32″S 114°45′45″E	
WAOU		Sanggu Airport	Buntok	01°40′11″S 114°53′58″E	
WAPA	AHI	Amahai Airport	Amahai, West Papua	03°20′49″S 128°55′34″E	
WAPB		Bula Airport	Bula	03°06′39″S 130°30′39″E	
WAPC	NDA	Bandanaira Airport	Banda	04°31′18″S 129°54′14″E	
WAPD	DOB	Rar Gwamar Airport	Dobo	05°46′18″S 134°12′45″E	
WAPF	LUV	Karel Sadsuitubun Airport	Maluku	05°45′37″S 132°45′34″E	
WAPG	NRE	Namrole Airport	South Buru, Maluku	03°51′21″S 126°41′59″E	
WAPK	BJK	Nangasuri Aru Airport	Benjina	06°03′58″S 134°16′26″E	
WAPL	LUV	Dominicus Dumatubun Air Force Base	Langgur	05°39′41″S 132°43′53″E	
WAPM	JIO	Jos Orno Imsula Airport	Tiakur	08°08′26″S 127°54′26″E	
WAPN	NAM	Namniwel Airport	Buru	03°08′37″S 126°58′40″E	
WAPO	LRC	Larat Airport	Larat	07°07′41″S 131°46′01″E	
WAPP	AMQ	Pattimura Airport	Ambon, Maluku	03°42′37″S 128°05′21″E	
WAPR	NAM	Namniwel Airport	Namlea, Buru, Maluku	03°14′13″S 127°06′01″E	
WAPS	SXK	Mathilda Batlayeri Airport	Saumlaki	07°50′58″S 131°20′02″E	
WAPT	TAX	Taliabu Airport	Taliabu Island	01°38′33″S 124°33′32″E	
WAPU	KFR	Kufar Airport	Seram Bagian Timur	03°27′48″S 130°47′16″E	
WAPV	WBA	Wahai Airport	Central Maluku	02°48′40″S 129°29′06″E	
WAQA	NNX	Nunukan Airport	Nunukan	04°08′12″N 117°40′01″E	Formerly WRLF
WAQB	BYQ	Bunyu Airport	Bunyu, East Kalimantan	03°27′21″N 117°52′03″E	
WAQC	RTU	Maratua Airport	Derawan Islands	02°11′51″N 118°35′57″E	
WAQD	TJS	Tanjung Harapan Airport	Tanjung Selor	02°50′11″N 117°22′25″E	
WAQE		Long Alango Airport	Malinau	02°55′50″N 115°51′04″E	
WAQG		S. Tipa Padan Airport	Binuang	03°46′26″N 115°51′21″E	
WAQH		Long Rungan Airport	Nunukan	03°35′56″N 115°50′27″E	
WAQJ	LBW	Juvai Semaring Airport	Long Bawan	03°54′11″N 115°41′31″E	Formerly WRLB
WAQK	MKJ	Mangkajang Airport	Mangkajang	02°00′18″N 117°44′31″E	
WAQL	LPU	Long Apung Airport	Long Apung	01°42′13″N 114°58′13″E	Formerly WALP
WAQM	LNU	Robert Atty Bessing Airport	Malinau City, North Kalimantan	03°34′31″N 116°37′11″E	
WAPQ		Long Pala Airport	Malinau	04°02′38″N 116°07′43″E	
WAQQ	TRK	Juwata Airport	Tarakan, North Kalimantan	03°19′36″N 117°33′56″E	
WAQS		Long Lebusan Airport	Long Lebusan	01°25′19″N 115°23′29″E	
WAQT	BEJ	Kalimarau Airport	Berau	02°09′19″N 117°25′56″E	
WAQU		Long Layu Airport	Nunukan	03°36′42″N 115°41′57″E	
WAQV		Long Pujungan Airport	Malinau	02°35′27″N 115°47′55″E	
WAQW		Long Sule Airport	Malinau	01°23′05″N 115°42′26″E	
WARA	MLG	Abdul Rachman Saleh Airport	Malang, East Java	07°55′42″S 112°42′48″E	
WARC	CPF	Ngloram Airport	Cepu	07°11′41″S 111°32′53″E	Formerly WRSC
WARD	DHX	Dhoho Airport	Kediri	07°45′42″S 111°57′05″E	
WARE	JBB	Notohadinegoro Airport	Jember, East Java	08°14′28″S 113°41′38″E	
WARI	MDN	Iswahjudi Air Force Base	Madiun	07°36′57″S 111°26′03″E	
WARP		Pagerungan Airport	Pagerungan Besar Island	06°57′23″S 115°55′52″E	
WARR	SUB	Juanda International Airport	Sidoarjo (near Surabaya)	07°22′47″S 112°47′13″E	
WART	SUP	Trunojoyo Airport	Sumenep	07°01′27″S 113°53′25″E	
WARW	BXW	Harun Thohir Airport	Bawean	05°43′25″S 112°40′45″E	
WASA	AYW	Ayawasi Airport	Ayawasi	01°09′35″S 132°27′55″E	
WASC	RSK	Abreso Airport	Ransiki	01°30′12″S 134°11′20″E	
WASF	FKQ	Torea Airport	Fak Fak	02°55′12″S 132°16′01″E	Closed
WASI	INX	Inanwatan Airport	Inanwatan	02°07′39″S 132°09′36″E	
WASK	KNG	Utarom Airport	Kaimana	03°38′40″S 133°41′43″E	
WASN	RJM	Marinda Airport	Waisai	00°25′32″S 130°46′33″E	
WASO	BXB	Babo Airport	Babo	02°31′56″S 133°26′20″E	
WASS	SOQ	Domine Eduard Osok Airport	Sorong	00°53′39″S 131°17′20″E	Closed
WAST	TXM	Teminabuan Airport	Teminabuan	01°26′44″S 132°01′14″E	
WASU	KBX	Kambuaya Airport	Kambuaya	01°19′08″S 132°16′55″E	
WASW		Suswa Airport	Suswa	00°56′31″S 132°17′53″E	
WATA	ABU	A. A. Bere Tallo Airport	Atambua, East Nusa Tenggara	09°04′29″S 124°54′12″E	
WATB	BJW	Bajawa Soa Airport	Bajawa, East Nusa Tenggara	08°42′27″S 121°03′27″E	Formerly WRKB
WATC	MOF	Frans Xavier Seda Airport	Maumere, East Nusa Tenggara	08°38′27″S 122°14′13″E	
WATE	ENE	H. Hasan Aroeboesman Airport	Ende, East Nusa Tenggara	08°50′57″S 121°39′38″E	
WATG	RTG	Frans Sales Lega Airport	Ruteng, East Nusa Tenggara	08°35′46″S 120°28′43″E	
WATK	TMC	Lede Kalumbang Airport	Tambolaka	09°24′35″S 119°14′40″E	Formerly WADT
WATL	LKA	Gewayantana Airport	Larantuka, East Nusa Tenggara	08°16′28″S 123°00′08″E	
WATM	ARD	Mali Airport	Alor, East Nusa Tenggara	08°07′54″S 124°35′51″E	
WATO	LBJ	Komodo International Airport	Labuan Bajo, East Nusa Tenggara	08°29′12″S 119°53′21″E	Formerly WRKO
WATP	AXO	Kabir Airport	Pantar	08°14′45″S 124°13′07″E	
WATQ	KSX	John Becker Airport	Kisar	08°00′57″S 127°12′02″E	
WATR	RTI	David Constantijn Saudale Airport	Pulau Rote, East Nusa Tenggara	10°46′01″S 123°04′30″E	
WATS	SAU	Tardamu Airport	Sabu, East Nusa Tenggara	10°29′33″S 121°50′54″E	
WATT	KOE	El Tari Airport	Kupang, East Nusa Tenggara	10°10′17″S 123°40′16″E	
WATU	WGP	Umbu Mehang Kunda Airport	Waingapu	09°40′09″S 120°18′07″E	Formerly WADW
WATW	LWE	Wunopito Airport	Lewoleba, East Nusa Tenggara	08°21′45″S 123°26′17″E	
WAUA	AGD	Anggi Airport	Anggi	01°19′48″S 133°54′40″E	Also WASG
WAUB	NTI	Bintuni Airport	Bintuni	02°06′16″S 133°31′01″E	Formerly WASB
WAUD		Keder Airport	Sarmi	02°00′51″S 139°03′33″E	
WAUI		Merdey Airport	Teluk Bintuni	01°22′49″S 133°10′25″E	
WAUK	KEQ	Kebar Airport	Kebar	00°56′57″S 133°09′52″E	Formerly WASE
WAUM	RDE	Jahabra Airport	Merdei	01°31′10″S 133°31′32″E	Formerly WASM
WAUU	MKW	Rendani Airport	Manokwari	00°53′30″S 134°02′57″E	Formerly WASR
WAUW	WSR	Wasior Airport	Wasior	02°43′10″S 134°30′21″E	Formerly WASW
WAVA	LII	Mulia Airport	Mulia	03°42′06″S 137°57′26″E	
WAVB	BUI	Bokondini Airport	Bokondini	03°41′05″S 138°40′48″E	
WAVC	IUL	Ilu Airport	Ilu	03°42′16″S 138°12′01″E	
WAVD	DEX	Nop Goliat Dekai Airport	Dekai	04°51′14″S 139°29′08″E	
WAVE	ELR	Elelim Airport	Elelim	03°46′53″S 139°23′19″E	
WAVG	KBF	Karubaga Airport	Karubaga	03°41′12″S 138°28′46″E	
WAVI		Ninia Airport	Yahukimo	04°21′46″S 139°18′09″E	
WAVJ		Silimo Airport	Yahukimo	04°27′59″S 138°56′33″E	
WAVK		Kobakma Airport	Central Mamberamo	03°39′59″S 139°03′29″E	
WAVL	LLN	Kelila Airport	Kelila	03°43′41″S 138°42′38″E	
WAVM		Manggelum Airport	Boven Digoel	05°24′59″S 140°26′10″E	
WAVN		Anggruk Airport	Anggruk	04°12′00″S 139°25′58″E	
WAVO		Beoga Airport	Puncak	03°48′59″S 137°25′31″E	
WAVP		Holuwon Airport	Yahukimo	04°28′50″S 139°16′26″E	
WAVR	AAS	Apalapsili Airport	Yalimo	03°53′05″S 139°18′38″E	
WAVS		Mamit Airport	Tolikara	03°35′21″S 138°23′50″E	
WAVT	TMY	Tiom Airport	Tiom	03°55′33″S 138°27′21″E	
WAVU		Seradala Airport	Yahukimo	04°58′45″S 139°54′09″E	
WAVV	WMX	Wamena Airport	Wamena	04°05′54″S 138°57′06″E	
WAVW		Hasan Airport	Yahukimo	04°08′07″S 139°22′38″E	
WAVZ		Taiyeve Airport	Mamberamo Raya	03°14′00″S 138°26′45″E	
WAWA	KLK	Pomala Airport	Tambea	04°10′52″S 121°36′52″E	
WAWB	BUW	Betoambari Airport	Baubau	05°29′10″S 122°34′11″E	Formerly WAAB
WAWC	TQQ	Maranggo Airport	Tomia Island, Southeast Sulawesi	05°46′02″S 123°55′10″E	
WAWD	WNI	Matahora Airport	Wangi-Wangi	05°17′32″S 123°38′11″E	
WAWH	KSR	H. Aroeppala Airport	Selayar	06°10′43″S 120°26′14″E	
WAWN	APD	Arung Palakka Airport	Bone	04°27′33″S 120°18′33″E	
WAWP	KXB	Sangia Nibandera Airport	Tanggetada, Kolaka, Southeast Sulawesi	04°20′28″S 121°31′26″E	
WAWR	RAQ	Sugimanuru Airport	Raha	04°45′38″S 122°34′10″E	
WAWS	SQR	Sorowako Airport	Soroako	02°31′52″S 121°21′28″E	
WAWW	KDI	Haluoleo Airport	Kendari, Southeast Sulawesi	04°04′54″S 122°25′06″E	
WAYA		Alama Airport	Alama	04°15′46″S 137°53′34″E	
WAYB	UGU	Bilogai-Sugapa Airport	Intan Jaya	03°44′22″S 137°01′55″E	
WAYE	EWI	Enarotali Airport	Enarotali	03°55′33″S 136°22′41″E	Formerly WABT
WAYG		Akimuga Airport	Akimuga	04°36′14″S 137°39′29″E	
WAYH		Mapanduma Airport	Mapenduma	04°18′32″S 138°14′46″E	
WAYI		Bilai Airport	Intan Jaya	03°44′29″S 136°51′33″E	
WAYJ		Jila Airport	Mimika	04°14′49″S 137°35′44″E	
WAYK	KOX	Kokonao Airport	Kokonao	04°42′41″S 136°26′06″E	
WAYL	ILA	Ilaga Airport	Ilaga	03°59′59″S 137°39′10″E	Formerly WABL
WAYM		Kebo Airport	Kebo	03°49′30″S 136°23′09″E	
WAYN		Jita Airport	Mimika	04°51′22″S 137°42′07″E	
WAYO	OBD	Obano Airport	Obano	03°54′38″S 136°13′50″E	
WAYS		Pogapa Airport	Intan Jaya	03°45′07″S 136°50′45″E	
WAYY	TIM	Mozes Kilangin Airport	Timika	04°31′42″S 136°53′15″E	
WIAA		Cut Bau Airport	Sabang	05°52′29″N 095°20′22″E	
WIAF		Bentiang Airport	Landak	00°55′13″N 109°54′57″E	
WIAQ		Kuala Randau Airport	Ketapang	00°34′56″S 110°28′22″E	
WIAU		Madya Raya Airport	Melawi	00°51′54″S 111°39′49″E	
WIBB	PKU	Sultan Syarif Kasim II International Airport	Pekanbaru, Riau	00°27′34″N 101°26′40″E	Formerly Simpang Tiga Airport
WIBD	DUM	Pinang Kampai Airport	Dumai, Riau	01°36′33″N 101°26′01″E	
WIBG		Pasir Pengaraian Airport	Pasir Pengaraian	00°50′44″N 100°22′12″E	
WIBJ	RGT	Japura Airport	Rengat, Riau	00°21′08″S 102°20′06″E	
WIBL	RPL	Sultan Syarif Haroen Setia Negara Airport	Pelalawan	00°30′17″N 101°55′22″E	
WIBR	RKI	Rokot Airport	Sipura	02°06′00″S 099°42′16″E	
WIBS	SEQ	Sei Pakning Airport	Sungai Pakning	01°22′11″N 102°08′24″E	
WICA	KJT	Kertajati International Airport	Majalengka, West Java (near Bandung)	06°40′09″S 108°11′28″E	
WICB	BTO	Budiarto Airport	Tangerang, Banten	06°17′35″S 106°34′12″E	
WICC	BDO	Husein Sastranegara International Airport	Bandung, West Java	06°54′02″S 107°34′35″E	
WICD	CBN	Cakrabhuwana Airport (aka Penggung Airport)	Cirebon, West Java	06°45′22″S 108°32′23″E	
WICK		Sulaiman Air Force Base	Bandung	06°58′57″S 107°34′21″E	
WICM	TSY	Wiriadinata Airport	Tasikmalaya, West Java	07°20′48″S 108°14′46″E	
WICN	CJN	Nusawiru Airport	Pangandaran, West Java	07°43′12″S 108°29′19″E	
WIDB	TBX	Tambelan Airport	Riau Islands	00°58′48″N 107°33′53″E	
WIDD	BTH	Hang Nadim International Airport	Batam, Riau Islands	01°07′15″N 104°07′07″E	
WIDE	PPR	Tuanku Tambusai Airport	Pasir Pengaraian	00°50′44″N 100°22′11″E	
WIDL	LMU	Letung Airport	Jemaja Island	02°57′51″N 105°45′16″E	
WIDM	MWK	Matak Airport	Anambas Islands, Riau Province	03°20′53″N 106°15′29″E	Formerly WIOM
WIDN	TNJ	Raja Haji Fisabilillah International Airport	Tanjung Pinang, Riau Islands	00°55′21″N 104°31′56″E	Formerly Kijang Airport
WIDO	NTX	Ranai-Natuna Airport	Ranai, Riau Islands	03°54′31″N 108°23′16″E	Formerly WION
WIDS	SIQ	Dabo Airport	Singkep, Riau	00°28′54″S 104°34′52″E	
WIDT	TJB	Raja Haji Abdullah Airport	Tanjung Balai Karimun	01°03′09″N 103°23′19″E	Formerly WIBT
WIEB	RKI	Mentawai Airport	Mentawai Islands	02°05′57″S 099°42′21″E	
WIEE	PDG	Minangkabau International Airport	Ketaping, Padang Pariaman, West Sumatra	00°47′12″S 100°16′50″E	
WIFD		Nanga Nyabu Airport	Kapuas Hulu	01°00′50″N 112°42′50″E	
WIFE		Nanga Pinoh II Airport	Melawi	00°20′55″S 111°44′45″E	
WIFH		Nanga Raun Airport	Kapuas Hulu	00°37′41″N 113°10′31″E	
WIFL		Riam Batu Airport	Ketapang	01°29′51″S 110°40′30″E	
WIFM		Riam Sejawak Airport	Sintang	00°58′16″N 111°05′52″E	
WIGE	ENG	Enggano Airport	Enggano Island	05°18′19″S 102°11′21″E	
WIGG	BKS	Fatmawati Soekarno Airport	Bengkulu	03°51′43″S 102°20′12″E	
WIGM	MPC	Mukomuko Airport	Mukomuko, Bengkulu	02°32′27″S 101°05′15″E	
WIHC		Wiladatika Airport	South Jakarta	06°21′22″S 106°53′59″E	
WIHG	PPJ	Panjang Island Airport	Thousand Islands	05°38′38″S 106°33′46″E	Closed
WIHH	HLP	Halim Perdanakusuma International Airport	Jakarta	06°15′59″S 106°53′28″E	
WIHI		Salakanagara Tanjung Lesung Airport	Pandeglang	06°29′30″S 105°40′10″E	
WIHJ		Atang Sendjaja Air Force Base	Kemang	06°32′20″S 106°45′19″E	
WIHK		Suryadarma Air Force Base	Subang	06°31′53″S 107°39′33″E	Formerly WIIK
WIHP	PCB	Pondok Cabe Airport	South Tangerang	06°20′13″S 106°45′54″E	
WIID	JKT	Kemayoran Airport	Jakarta	06°08′50″S 106°51′00″E	Closed
WIIG	PPJ	Pulau Panjang Airport	Pulau Panjang	05°38′40″S 106°33′45″E	
WIII	CGK	Soekarno–Hatta International Airport	Tangerang, Banten (near Jakarta)	06°07′32″S 106°39′21″E	
WIJB	BUU	Muara Bungo Airport	Muara Bungo	01°32′33″S 102°10′58″E	
WIJI	KRC	Depati Parbo Airport	Kerinci	02°05′28″S 101°27′46″E	Formerly WIPH
WIJJ	DJB	Sultan Thaha Airport	Jambi	01°38′17″S 103°38′40″E	
WIKK	PGK	Depati Amir Airport	Pangkalpinang, Bangka Belitung Islands	02°09′43″S 106°08′20″E	
WIKT	TJQ	H.A.S. Hanandjoeddin International Airport	Tanjung Pandan	02°44′44″S 107°45′17″E	Formerly Buluh Tumbang Airport
WILB		Tambling Airport	Pesisir Barat	05°55′16″S 104°33′29″E	
WILL	TKG	Radin Inten II Airport	Bandar Lampung	05°14′33″S 105°10′44″E	Formerly WIIT
WILM	AKQ	Prince M. Bunyamin Air Force Base	Tulang Bawang	04°36′41″S 105°13′56″E	
WILP	TFY	Muhammad Taufiq Kiemas Airport	Krui	05°12′40″S 103°56′12″E	
WILW		Way Jepara Airport	East Lampung	05°03′04″S 105°39′18″E	
WIMA	LSW	Malikus Saleh Airport	Aceh Utara	05°13′44″N 096°57′05″E	
WIMB	GNS	Binaka Airport	Gunungsitoli, North Sumatra	01°09′58″N 097°42′16″E	
WIME	AEG	Aek Godang Airport	Padang Sidempuan	01°24′00″N 099°25′50″E	
WIMF	JHN	Jenderal Besar Abdul Haris Nasution Airport	Mandailing Natal	00°56′53″N 099°32′00″E	
WIMG	PDG	Sutan Sjahrir Air Force Base	Padang, West Sumatra	00°52′51″S 100°21′14″E	Formerly Tabing Airport
WIMH		Helvetia Airport	Medan	03°40′59″N 098°38′39″E	
WIMI	FSH	Syekh Hamzah Fansyuri Airport	Singkil	02°16′10″N 097°58′05″E	
WIMK	MES	Soewondo Air Force Base	Medan, North Sumatra	03°33′29″N 098°40′18″E	Formerly Polonia International Airport
WIML	LKI	Lasikin Airport	Sinabang	02°24′32″N 096°19′34″E	
WIMM	KNO	Kualanamu International Airport	Deli Serdang, North Sumatra	03°38′32″N 098°53′07″E	
WIMN	DTB	Raja Sisingamangaraja XII Airport	Siborong-Borong	02°15′35″N 098°59′43″E	
WIMO		Lasondre Airport	Batu Islands	00°01′07″S 098°17′57″E	
WIMP	SIW	Sibisa Airport	Simalungun	02°36′01″N 098°57′52″E	
WIMS	FLZ	Ferdinand Lumban Tobing Airport	Sibolga	01°33′21″N 098°53′20″E	
WIMT	TPK	Teuku Cut Ali Airport	Tapak Tuan	03°10′09″N 097°17′18″E	
WIMU	LSR	Alas Leuser Airport	Kutacane	03°23′30″N 097°51′49″E	Formerly WILD
WIOD	SKJ	Singkawang Airport	Singkawang	00°47′55″N 108°57′26″E	
WIOG	NPO	Nanga Pinoh Airport	Kalimantan	00°20′54″S 111°44′44″E	
WIOH		Liku Airport	Sambas	01°44′15″N 109°19′26″E	
WIOK	KTG	Rahadi Oesman Airport	Ketapang	01°48′59″S 109°57′48″E	
WIOO	PNK	Supadio International Airport	Pontianak, West Kalimantan	00°09′02″S 109°24′14″E	
WIOP	PSU	Pangsuma Airport	Putussibau	00°50′08″N 112°56′13″E	
WIOS	SQG	Tebelian Airport	Sintang	00°02′31″S 111°27′24″E	
WIOY		Suti Airport	Bengkayang	00°52′42″N 109°49′34″E	
WIPB	LLJ	Silampari Airport	Lubuklinggau	03°16′48″S 102°55′02″E	Formerly WIKL
WIPD		Banding Agung Airport	Pasar Bandingagung	04°47′13″S 103°55′59″E	
WIPO	WYK	Gatot Subroto Airport	Way Tuba	04°23′30″S 104°24′05″E	
WIPP	PLM	Sultan Mahmud Badaruddin II International Airport	Palembang, South Sumatra	02°54′01″S 104°42′00″E	
WIPQ	PDO	Pendopo Airport	Pendopo	03°17′10″S 103°52′47″E	
WIPV	KLQ	Keluang Airport	Keluang	02°38′27″S 103°54′52″E	Closed
WIPY	PXA	Atung Bungsu Airport	Pagar Alam	04°01′21″S 103°22′45″E	
WIQB		Tembaga Airport	Sekadau	00°30′07″S 110°40′42″E	
WIRC		Cengkareng Heliport	Tangerang Regency	06°08′26″S 106°39′20″E	
WIRR	RTO	Budiarto Airport	Tangerang	06°17′25″S 106°34′09″E	
WISA		Smart Semelagi Airport	Singkawang	00°59′53″N 109°03′07″E	
WITC	MEQ	Cut Nyak Dhien Airport	Meulaboh, Aceh	04°02′37″N 096°15′03″E	
WITG	SMG	Lasikin Airport	Sinabang, Aceh	02°25′00″N 096°19′45″E	
WITK	TXE	Rembele Airport	Takengon	04°43′15″N 096°50′58″E	
WITL	LSX	Lhok Sukon Airport	Lhok Sukon (Lhoksukon), Aceh	05°04′10″N 097°15′33″E	
WITM	LSW	Malikus Saleh Airport	Lhokseumawe	05°13′36″N 096°57′01″E	
WITN	SBG	Maimun Saleh Airport	Sabang, Aceh	05°52′29″N 095°20′24″E	Formerly WIAB
WITO	KJX	Blangpidie Airport	Blangpidie	03°44′04″N 096°47′28″E	
WITT	BTJ	Sultan Iskandar Muda International Airport (Blangbintang Airport)	Banda Aceh, Aceh	05°31′24″N 095°25′13″E	
WREF		Aurime Airport	Sarmi	02°10′55″S 138°26′04″E	
WREK		Bataf Airport	Sarmi	02°07′19″S 139°15′32″E	
WREN		Bomela Airport	Yahukimo	04°41′37″S 139°54′46″E	
WREX		Doyo Baru Airport	Jayapura	02°32′20″S 140°27′52″E	
WRFB		Eipomek Airport	Yahukimo	04°27′22″S 140°01′31″E	
WRFC		Endomen Airport	Yahukimo	04°13′27″S 139°52′54″E	
WRFH		Eri Airport	Mamberamo Raya	02°38′14″S 138°06′07″E	
WRFJ		Foao Airport	Sarmi	03°03′58″S 139°05′57″E	
WRFL		Geyarek Airport	Nduga	04°39′00″S 138°45′08″E	
WRFR		Haya Airport	Mamberamo Raya	02°48′55″S 138°06′36″E	
WRFT		Hulu Atas Airport	Jayapura	03°40′48″S 140°13′47″E	
WRFV		Ilugwa Airport	Central Mamberamo	03°50′09″S 138°55′18″E	
WRGA		Kaiy Airport	Mamberamo Raya	02°59′14″S 138°06′23″E	
WRGC		Kanggime Airport	Tolikara	03°39′57″S 138°21′42″E	
WRGD		Kaure Airport	Keerom	03°28′11″S 140°21′43″E	
WRGG		Keneyan Airport	Nduga	04°35′58″S 138°23′04″E	
WRGK		Kiwi Airport	Pegunungan Bintang	04°41′52″S 140°43′21″E	
WRGO		Kono Airport	Yahukimo	04°16′33″S 139°44′09″E	
WRGP		Koropun Airport	Yahukimo	04°28′46″S 139°39′00″E	
WRGQ		Kosarek Airport	Yahukimo	04°07′38″S 139°31′53″E	
WRGS		Kwelamdua Airport	Yahukimo	04°41′25″S 139°45′19″E	
WRGT		Kuyawage Airport	Lanny Jaya	04°01′34″S 138°12′14″E	
WRGX		Lamdikma Airport	Yalimo	03°49′16″S 139°14′32″E	
WRHA		Langda Airport	Yahukimo	04°40′42″S 139°58′28″E	
WRHC		Makki Airport	Lanny Jaya	03°58′07″S 138°37′43″E	
WRHD		Mbuwa Airport	Nduga	04°14′18″S 138°27′56″E	
WRHI		Nalca Airport	Yahukimo	04°21′49″S 139°50′07″E	
WRHK		Nenei Airport	South Manokwari	01°29′31″S 133°59′45″E	
WRHL		Nipsan Airport	Yahukimo	04°07′00″S 139°38′50″E	
WRHO		Pagai Airport	Jayapura	03°32′14″S 139°46′55″E	
WRHP		Papasena Airport	Mamberamo Raya	02°54′55″S 138°35′16″E	
WRHR		Pass Valley Airport	Yalimo	03°51′31″S 139°06′01″E	
WRHV		Piramid Airport	Jayawijaya	03°54′12″S 138°45′47″E	
WRIB		Pit River Airport	Lanny Jaya	03°58′56″S 138°31′59″E	
WRIC		Poga Airport	Lanny Jaya	03°48′05″S 138°35′15″E	
WRID		Polimo Airport	Yahukimo	04°13′10″S 139°02′02″E	
WRIE		Pronggoli Airport	Yahukimo	04°11′18″S 139°20′32″E	
WRIF		Puldamat Airport	Yahukimo	04°19′11″S 139°52′14″E	
WRIH		Sape Airport	Pegunungan Bintang	04°45′55″S 140°30′19″E	
WRIJ		Sela Airport	Yahukimo	04°33′02″S 139°44′05″E	
WRIL		Sikari Airport	Mamberamo Raya	02°45′43″S 138°23′11″E	
WRIP		Soba Airport	Yahukimo	04°20′46″S 139°10′44″E	
WRIQ		Somanente Airport	Sarmi	02°12′05″S 138°52′09″E	
WRIR		Sukubatom Airport	Pegunungan Bintang	04°26′34″S 140°53′01″E	
WRIS		Sumo Airport	Yahukimo	04°45′02″S 139°21′12″E	
WRIW		Tangma Airport	Yahukimo	04°15′35″S 139°02′48″E	
WRJK		Walerek Airport	Yalimo	03°59′36″S 139°29′31″E	
WRJL		Walma Airport	Yahukimo	04°13′04″S 139°23′37″E	
WRJR		Wolo Airport	Jayawijaya	03°51′01″S 138°51′37″E	
WRJS		Wunin Airport	Tolikara	03°39′02″S 138°33′16″E	
WRJU		Yapil Airport	Pegunungan Bintang	04°32′26″S 140°33′58″E	
WRJV		Yigi Airport	Nduga	04°13′42″S 138°23′38″E	
WRKA		Yogosem Airport	Yahukimo	04°14′52″S 139°10′08″E	
WRLA		Bugalaga Airport	Intan Jaya	03°37′25″S 136°35′46″E	
WRLB		Dagai Airport	Puncak Jaya	03°18′21″S 137°56′37″E	
WRLD		Eaopoto Airport	Paniai	03°56′59″S 136°20′17″E	
WRLG		Faowi Airport	Puncak Jaya	03°13′49″S 137°43′34″E	
WRLH		Hitadipa Airport	Intan Jaya	03°44′03″S 137°07′03″E	
WRLI		Illaga III Airport	Puncak	03°59′57″S 137°39′11″E	
WRLJ		Iratoi Airport	Puncak	03°14′19″S 137°20′02″E	
WRLL		Karas Airport	Fakfak	03°28′24″S 132°52′03″E	
WRLM		Kegata Airport	Dogiyai	04°02′44″S 135°33′32″E	
WRLN		Komopa Airport	Paniai	03°48′00″S 136°28′39″E	
WRLQ		Lumo Airport	Puncak Jaya	03°40′04″S 137°48′28″E	
WRLR		Modio Airport	Dogiyai	04°03′59″S 135°47′25″E	
WRLS		Obogwy Airport	Mamberamo Raya	02°50′06″S 137°58′20″E	
WRLT		Omban Airport	Pegunungan Bintang	04°22′10″S 140°23′33″E	
WRLV		Wapoga Airport	Waropen	03°02′25″S 136°22′38″E	
WRLX		Tigi Airport	Deiyai	04°01′32″S 136°12′42″E	
WRLY		Timepa Airport	Dogiyai	04°00′17″S 135°47′14″E	
WRMA		Basiem Airport	Asmat	06°03′32″S 138°23′02″E	
WRMH		Miaro Airport	Mappi	06°11′52″S 139°00′29″E	
WRMJ		Yaosakor Airport	Asmat	05°36′13″S 138°27′55″E	
WRNA		Turimo Airport	Puncak Jaya	03°16′25″S 137°33′29″E	
WRNB		Weri Airport	Puncak Jaya	03°17′21″S 137°49′54″E	
WRPO		Kwerba Airport	Mamberamo Raya	02°38′36″S 138°24′32″E	
WRPS		Magode Airport	Dogiyai	03°59′26″S 135°51′12″E	
WRQO		Noyadi Airport	Mamberamo Raya	02°43′26″S 137°49′44″E	
WRRP		Mayado Airport	Bintuni Bay	01°54′33″S 133°09′28″E	
WRSJ		Waaf Airport	Sarmi	02°19′47″S 138°44′56″E	

== WB - Brunei and East Malaysia ==
All airports are in Malaysia unless otherwise noted.

- Brunei: Also see airport category and list.
- Malaysia: Also see airport category and list.

ICAO	IATA	Airport name	Community	Coordinates	Notes
WBAK	KUB	Anduki Airfield	Seria, Brunei	04°38′12″N 114°22′52″E	
WBGA	LKH	Long Akah Airport	Long Akah	03°18′46″N 114°47′11″E	
WBGB	BTU	Bintulu Airport	Bintulu, Sarawak	03°07′27″N 113°01′11″E	
WBGC	BLG	Belaga Airport	Belaga, Sarawak	02°38′10″N 113°45′38″E	
WBGD	LSM	Long Semado Airport	Long Semado / Lawas, Sarawak	04°12′59″N 115°34′58″E	Closed
WBGF	LGL	Long Lellang Airport	Long Lellang, Sarawak	03°25′16″N 115°09′12″E	
WBGG	KCH	Kuching International Airport	Kuching, Sarawak	01°29′14″N 110°20′31″E	
WBGI	ODN	Long Seridan Airport	Long Seridan, Sarawak	03°58′34″N 115°04′02″E	
WBGJ	LMN	Limbang Airport	Limbang, Sarawak	04°48′29″N 115°00′37″E	
WBGK	MKM	Mukah Airport	Mukah, Sarawak	02°52′55″N 112°02′36″E	
WBGL	LBP	Long Banga Airport	Long Banga, Sarawak	03°12′08″N 115°24′07″E	
WBGM	MUR	Marudi Airport	Marudi, Sarawak	04°10′39″N 114°19′19″E	
WBGN	BSE	Sematan Airport	Sematan	01°48′49″N 109°45′46″E	
WBGP	KPI	Kapit Airport	Kapit, Sarawak	02°00′35″N 112°55′55″E	
WBGQ	BKM	Ba'kelalan Airport	Ba'kelalan, Sarawak	03°59′19″N 115°37′08″E	
WBGR	MYY	Miri Airport	Miri, Sarawak	04°19′31″N 113°59′18″E	
WBGS	SBW	Sibu Airport	Sibu, Sarawak	02°15′51″N 111°58′57″E	
WBGU	LSU	Long Sukang Airport	Long Sukang, Sarawak	04°33′08″N 115°29′38″E	
WBGW	LWY	Lawas Airport	Lawas, Sarawak	04°50′57″N 115°24′10″E	
WBGZ	BBN	Bario Airport	Bario, Sarawak	03°44′13″N 115°28′10″E	
WBKA	SMM	Semporna Airport	Semporna, Sabah	04°26′59″N 118°35′47″E	
WBKB		Kota Belud Airport	Kota Belud, Sabah	06°21′59″N 116°27′48″E	
WBKD	LDU	Lahad Datu Airport	Lahad Datu, Sabah	05°01′59″N 118°19′16″E	
WBKE	TEL	Telupid Airport	Telupid	05°37′43″N 117°07′32″E	
WBKG	KGU	Keningau Airport	Keningau, Sabah	05°21′26″N 116°09′33″E	
WBKH	SXS	Sahabat Airport	Sahabat, Sabah	05°05′22″N 119°05′16″E	
WBKK	BKI	Kota Kinabalu International Airport	Kota Kinabalu, Sabah	05°55′57″N 116°02′57″E	
WBKL	LBU	Labuan Airport	Labuan, Sabah	05°18′06″N 115°14′54″E	
WBKM	TMG	Tommanggong Airport	Tommanggong	05°23′59″N 118°38′47″E	Closed
WBKN	GSA	Long Pasia Airport	Long Pasia, Sabah	04°24′34″N 115°43′28″E	
WBKO	SPE	Sepulot Airport	Sepulot	04°42′44″N 116°27′13″E	
WBKP	PAY	Pamol Airport	Pamol	05°59′34″N 117°23′47″E	
WBKR	RNU	Ranau Airport	Ranau, Sabah	05°57′29″N 116°40′25″E	
WBKS	SDK	Sandakan Airport	Sandakan, Sabah	05°54′06″N 118°02′55″E	
WBKT	KUD	Kudat Airport	Kudat, Sabah	06°55′27″N 116°49′51″E	
WBKU		Kuala Penyu Airport	Kuala Penyu, Sabah	05°35′59″N 115°34′28″E	
WBKW	TWU	Tawau Airport	Tawau, Sabah	04°18′48″N 118°07′19″E	
WBMU	MZV	Mulu Airport	Mulu, Sarawak	04°03′02″N 114°48′33″E	
WBSB	BWN	Brunei International Airport	Bandar Seri Begawan, Brunei	04°56′39″N 114°55′42″E	
WBTM	TGC	Tanjung Manis Airport	Tanjung Manis	02°10′40″N 111°12′07″E	

== WM - Peninsular Malaysia ==
Also see airport category and list.

ICAO	IATA	Airport name	Community	Coordinates	Notes
WMAC		Benta Airport	Benta, Pahang	04°02′59″N 101°58′55″E	Military
WMAD		Bentong Airport	Bentong, Pahang	03°32′59″N 101°52′55″E	Military
WMAH		RMAF Grik	Grik	05°25′59″N 101°06′55″E	
WMAJ		Jendarata Airport	Jendarata	03°53′59″N 100°56′55″E	
WMAN		Sungai Tiang Airport	Sungai Tiang	04°19′49″N 102°23′42″E	Closed
WMAP		Kluang Airport	Kluang, Johor	02°02′38″N 103°18′27″E	
WMAU	MEP	Mersing Airport	Mersing, Johor	02°23′00″N 103°51′34″E	Closed
WMAV		Muar Airport	Muar, Johor	02°03′00″N 102°38′54″E	
WMAZ		Segamat Airport	Segamat, Johor	02°30′00″N 102°49′54″E	
WMBA	SWY	Sitiawan Airport	Sitiawan, Perak	04°12′59″N 100°41′55″E	
WMBE		Temerloh Airport	Temerloh, Pahang	03°27′59″N 102°22′54″E	Military
WMBF		Ulu Bernam Airport	Ulu Bernam	03°44′59″N 101°10′05″E	
WMBH		RMAF Kroh	Kroh	05°40′59″N 100°58′55″E	
WMBI	TPG	Tekah Airport / Taiping Airport	Taiping, Perak	04°51′49″N 100°42′55″E	
WMBR		Bernam River Airfield	Seri Keledang	03°45′58″N 101°19′08″E	
WMBT	TOD	Tioman Airport	Tioman Island (Pulau Tioman), Pahang	02°49′09″N 104°09′36″E	
WMGK		RMAF Gong Kedak Air Base	Gong Kedak, Terengganu	05°47′56″N 102°29′25″E	
WMKA	AOR	Sultan Abdul Halim Airport	Alor Star, Kedah	06°11′40″N 100°24′03″E	
WMKB	BWH	RMAF Butterworth Air Base	Butterworth, Penang	05°27′58″N 100°23′28″E	
WMKC	KBR	Sultan Ismail Petra Airport	Kota Bharu, Kelantan	06°10′02″N 102°17′32″E	
WMKD	KUA	Sultan Haji Ahmad Shah Airport / (RMAF Kuantan)	Kuantan, Pahang	03°46′11″N 103°12′34″E	Formally Padang Geroda Airport
WMKE	KTE	Kerteh Airport	Kerteh, Terengganu	04°32′15″N 103°25′36″E	
WMKF		RMAF Kuala Lumpur Air Base	Sungai Besi, Kuala Lumpur	03°06′41″N 101°42′10″E	Closed
WMKI	IPH	Sultan Azlan Shah Airport	Ipoh, Perak	04°34′09″N 101°05′35″E	
WMKJ	JHB	Senai International Airport	Senai / Johor Bahru, Johor	01°38′26″N 103°40′13″E	
WMKK	KUL	Kuala Lumpur International Airport	Sepang, Selangor	02°44′36″N 101°41′53″E	
WMKL	LGK	Langkawi International Airport	Langkawi (Pulau Langkawi), Kedah	06°20′00″N 099°44′00″E	
WMKM	MKZ	Malacca Airport	Malacca	02°15′47″N 102°15′09″E	
WMKN	TGG	Sultan Mahmud Airport	Kuala Terengganu, Terengganu	05°22′53″N 103°06′17″E	
WMKP	PEN	Penang International Airport	George Town, Penang	05°17′50″N 100°16′37″E	
WMLH		Lumut Airport	Lumut, Perak	04°13′58″N 100°37′04″E	Military
WMLU	LUT	Lutong Airport	Lutong, Sarawak	04°27′17″N 114°00′13″E	In East Malaysia; closed
WMPA		Pangkor Airport	Pulau Pangkor	04°14′41″N 100°33′12″E	
WMPR		Redang Airport	Pulau Redang	05°45′55″N 103°00′25″E	
WMSA	SZB	Sultan Abdul Aziz Shah Airport	Subang Jaya, Selangor	03°07′52″N 101°32′53″E	

== WP - Timor-Leste ==
Also see airport category and list.

ICAO	IATA	Airport name	Community	Coordinates
WPAT	AUT	Atauro Airport	Atauro	08°12′38″S 125°36′58″E
WPDB	UAI	Suai Airport	Suai	09°18′14″S 125°17′13″E
WPDH	DIC	Dili City Heliport	Dili	08°33′32″S 125°32′13″E
WPDL	DIL	Presidente Nicolau Lobato International Airport (Comoro Int'l)	Dili	08°32′47″S 125°31′29″E
WPEC	BCH	Baucau Airport	Baucau	08°29′06″S 126°23′56″E
WPFL		Fuiloro Airport	Fuiloro	08°26′37″S 126°59′20″E
WPMN	MPT	Maliana Airport	Maliana	08°58′20″S 125°12′55″E
WPOC	OEC	Oecusse Airport	Pante Macassar	09°11′53″S 124°20′41″E
WPVQ		Viqueque Airport	Viqueque	08°53′02″S 126°22′23″E

== WS - Singapore ==
Also see airport category and list.

ICAO	IATA	Airport name	Community	Coordinates	Notes
WSAG		Sembawang Air Base (RSAF)	Sembawang	01°25′31″N 103°48′46″E	
WSAP	QPG	Paya Lebar Air Base (RSAF)	Paya Lebar	01°21′37″N 103°54′34″E	
WSAT	TGA	Tengah Air Base (RSAF)	Tengah	01°23′14″N 103°42′31″E	
WSSL	XSP	Seletar Airport	Seletar	01°25′01″N 103°52′04″E	
WSSS	SIN	Singapore Changi Airport/Changi Air Base (Joint civilian-military usage)	Changi	01°21′33″N 103°59′22″E	Eastern portion of air base uses code WSAC
