= List of Malaysia Airlines destinations =

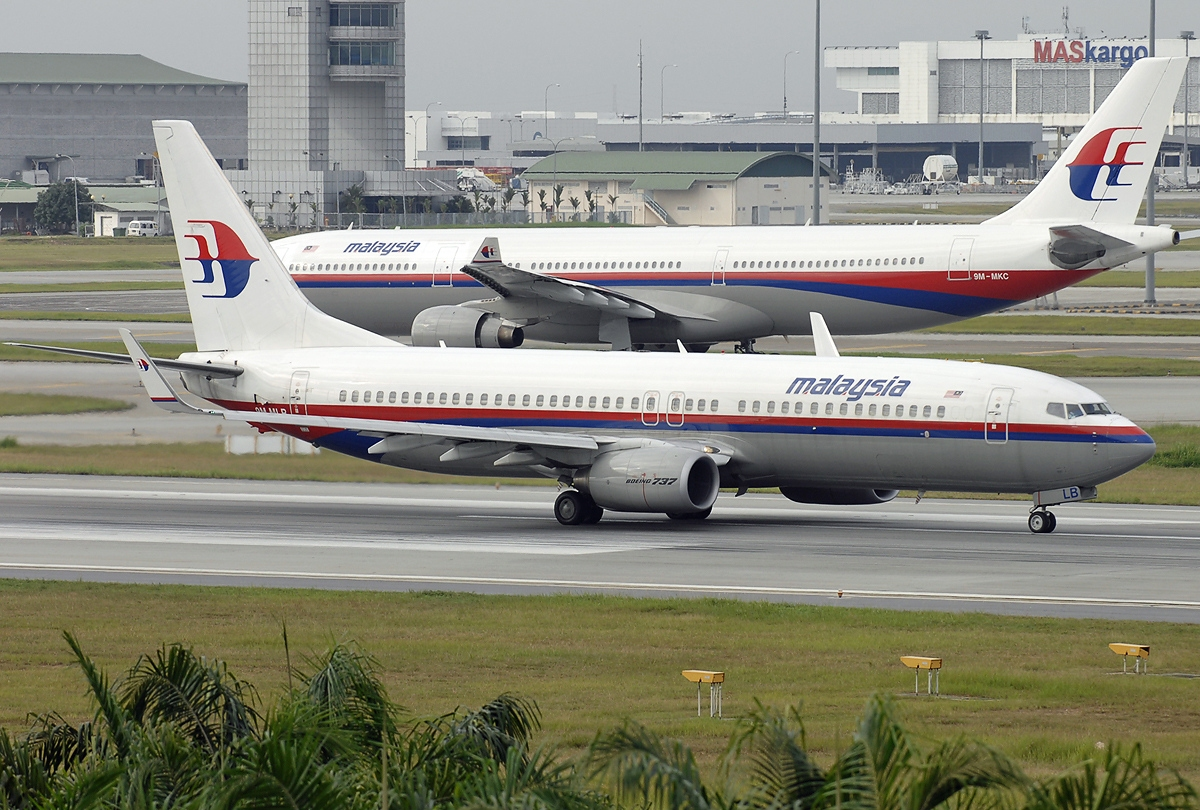
Malaysia Airlines operations at Kuala Lumpur International Airport

Malaysia Airlines, Malaysia's flag carrier, traces its origins back to 1947, when Malayan Airways was jointly formed by Singapore's Straits Steamship Company and the Ocean Steamship Company of Liverpool. The carrier was registered in Singapore and was set up to link several cities within Malaya, as well as to provide an air connection with Borneo and other parts of the region. In 1947, the newly formed airline started scheduled operations with a single Airspeed Consul, linking Singapore-Kallang Airport with Kuala Lumpur and Penang, and Kuala Lumpur with Kota Bharu and Kuantan.

By 1948, the domestic route network comprised Ipoh, Kuala Lumpur, Penang, Singapore, Kota Bharu and Kuantan, whereas international flights to Batavia, Bangkok, Medan, Saigon and Palembang were also operated. In May 1949, Malayan Airways took over the Singapore–Kuching–Labuan–Jesselton route, which had been operated by the Royal Air Force since May 1946 and was the only air link between Singapore and Borneo. The run was extended to Sandakan in October that same year. In early 1950, the route network was 6,504 miles (10,467 km) long.

Following the formation of Malaysia, Malayan Airways was renamed Malaysian Airways in November 1963. On 14 May 1966, the airline officially became the national airline of Malaysia and Singapore, jointly operated by both countries.

The company was re-christened again on 1 January 1967, this time to Malaysia–Singapore Airlines (MSA). MSA began to deploy its de Havilland Comet aircraft on the Kuala Lumpur–Singapore route, and also on services radiating from these two cities to Bangkok, Hong Kong, Manila, Perth and Taipei. These aircraft were used on selected domestic routes as well. A year later, Jakarta and Sydney were already incorporated into the international route network, with the Singapore–Jakarta–Perth–Sydney service using a Boeing 707 that was leased from Qantas, and by April 1969 Tokyo was included as well. The inauguration of services to Colombo and Madras were announced in April 1970 for commencement in June that year and flights to these two cities were operative by May 1971.

Based at Subang International Airport, Malaysian Airlines System Berhad (MAS) was formed by the Malaysian government in April 1971 to succeed MSA, starting operations on 1 October 1972, a day after MSA became defunct over its splitting between MAS and Singapore Airlines. The new airline's route network initially consisted of domestic flights plus international services to Bangkok, Hong Kong, Jakarta, Medan and Singapore. By March 1975, Bandar Seri Begawan, Dubai, Haadyai, Kota Kinabalu, Kuching, London, Madras, Manila, Sydney, Taipei and Tokyo were added to these destinations, with Amsterdam, Frankfurt, Jeddah, Melbourne, Paris, Perth and Seoul also being served ten years later.

In April 2000, from its main hub at Kuala Lumpur International Airport, Malaysia Airlines operated scheduled services to domestic destinations including Alor Setar, Bakalalan, Bario, Belaga, Bintulu, Ipoh, Johor Bahru, Kota Bharu, Kota Kinabalu, Kuala Terengganu, Kuantan, Kuching, Kudat, Labuan, Lahad Datu, Langkawi, Lawas, Layang-Layang, Limbang, Long Lellang, Marudi, Medan, Miri, Mukah, Mulu, Penang, Pulau, Sandakan, Semporna, Sibu, Tarakan, Tawau and Tomanggong. International destinations served at the time included Adelaide, Amsterdam, Auckland, Bandar Seri Begawan, Bangkok, Beijing, Beirut, Brisbane, Buenos Aires, Cairns, Cairo, Cape Town, Cebu, Chennai, Chiang Mai, Darwin, Delhi, Bali, Dhaka, Dubai, Frankfurt, Fukuoka, Guangzhou, Hanoi, Hat Yai, Ho Chi Minh City, Hong Kong, Istanbul, Jakarta, Jeddah, Johannesburg, Kaohsiung, Karachi, London, Los Angeles, Malé, Manchester, Manila, Melbourne, Munich, Nagoya, New York, Osaka, Paris, Perth, Phnom Penh, Phuket, Pontianak, Rome, Seoul, Shanghai, Singapore, Surabaya, Sydney, Taipei, Tokyo, Vienna, Xiamen, Yangon, Zagreb and Zürich.

== List ==
As of June 2026, Malaysia Airlines flies to the following destinations.

Country	City	Airport	Notes	Refs
Argentina	Buenos Aires	Ministro Pistarini International Airport	Terminated	
Australia	Adelaide	Adelaide Airport		
Australia	Brisbane	Brisbane Airport		
Australia	Cairns	Cairns Airport	Terminated	
Australia	Canberra	Canberra Airport	Terminated	
Australia	Darwin	Darwin International Airport	Terminated	
Australia	Gold Coast	Gold Coast Airport	Terminated	
Australia	Hobart	Hobart Airport	Terminated	
Australia	Melbourne	Melbourne Airport		
Australia	Perth	Perth Airport		
Australia	Sydney	Sydney Airport		
Austria	Vienna	Vienna International Airport	Terminated	
Bahrain	Manama	Bahrain International Airport	Terminated	
Bangladesh	Dhaka	Hazrat Shahjalal International Airport		
Belgium	Brussels	Brussels Airport	Terminated	
Brunei	Bandar Seri Begawan	Brunei International Airport	Terminated	
Cambodia	Phnom Penh	Phnom Penh International Airport		
Cambodia	Siem Reap	Siem Reap International Airport	Airport closed	
Canada	Vancouver	Vancouver International Airport	Terminated	
China	Beijing	Beijing Capital International Airport	Terminated	
China	Beijing	Beijing Daxing International Airport		
China	Changsha	Changsha Huanghua International Airport		
China	Chengdu	Chengdu Shuangliu International Airport	Terminated	
China	Chengdu	Chengdu Tianfu International Airport		
China	Chongqing	Chongqing Jiangbei International Airport	Terminated	
China	Fuzhou	Fuzhou Changle International Airport	Terminated	
China	Guangzhou	Guangzhou Baiyun International Airport		
China	Guilin	Guilin Liangjiang International Airport	Terminated	
China	Haikou	Haikou Meilan International Airport	Terminated	
China	Hangzhou	Hangzhou Xiaoshan International Airport	Terminated	
China	Kunming	Kunming Changshui International Airport	Terminated	
China	Nanjing	Nanjing Lukou International Airport	Terminated	
China	Shanghai	Shanghai Pudong International Airport		
China	Shenzhen	Shenzhen Bao'an International Airport		
China	Tianjin	Tianjin Binhai International Airport	Terminated	
China	Wuhan	Wuhan Tianhe International Airport	Terminated	
China	Xi'an	Xi'an Xianyang International Airport	Terminated	
China	Xiamen	Xiamen Gaoqi International Airport		
Croatia	Zagreb	Zagreb Airport	Terminated	
Egypt	Cairo	Cairo International Airport	Terminated	
France	Paris	Charles de Gaulle Airport		
Germany	Frankfurt	Frankfurt Airport	Terminated	
Germany	Munich	Munich Airport	Terminated	
Hong Kong	Hong Kong	Hong Kong International Airport (Note: Operations were transferred from Kai Tak Airport in July 1998 when Kai Tak was closed.)		
Hong Kong	Hong Kong	Kai Tak Airport (Note: Operations were transferred to Hong Kong International Airport in July 1998 when Kai Tak was closed.)	Airport closed	
India	Ahmedabad	Ahmedabad Airport		
India	Amritsar	Sri Guru Ram Das Ji International Airport		
India	Bengaluru	Kempegowda International Airport		
India	Chennai	Chennai International Airport		
India	Delhi	Indira Gandhi International Airport		
India	Hyderabad	Rajiv Gandhi International Airport		
India	Kochi	Cochin International Airport		
India	Kolkata	Netaji Subhas Chandra Bose International Airport		
India	Mumbai	Chhatrapati Shivaji Maharaj International Airport		
India	Thiruvananthapuram	Thiruvananthapuram International Airport		
Indonesia	Balikpapan	Sultan Aji Muhammad Sulaiman Sepinggan Airport		
Indonesia	Bandung	Husein Sastranegara Airport	Terminated	
Indonesia	Bandung	Kertajati International Airport	Terminated	
Indonesia	Denpasar	Ngurah Rai International Airport		
Indonesia	Jakarta	Soekarno–Hatta International Airport		
Indonesia	Makassar	Sultan Hasanuddin International Airport		
Indonesia	Medan	Kualanamu International Airport		
Indonesia	Medan	Polonia International Airport	Airport closed	
Indonesia	Padang	Minangkabau International Airport	Terminated	
Indonesia	Pekanbaru	Sultan Syarif Kasim II International Airport		
Indonesia	Pontianak	Supadio International Airport	Terminated	
Indonesia	Surabaya	Juanda International Airport		
Indonesia	Surakarta	Adisoemarmo International Airport	Terminated	
Indonesia	Tarakan	Juwata Airport	Terminated	
Indonesia	Yogyakarta	Adisutjipto Airport	Terminated	
Indonesia	Yogyakarta	Yogyakarta International Airport		
Iran	Tehran	Mehrabad International Airport	Terminated	
Italy	Rome	Rome Fiumicino Airport	Terminated	
Japan	Fukuoka	Fukuoka Airport		
Japan	Nagoya	Chubu Centrair International Airport	Terminated	
Japan	Osaka	Kansai International Airport		
Japan	Tokyo	Haneda Airport		
Japan	Tokyo	Narita International Airport		
Kuwait	Kuwait City	Kuwait International Airport	Terminated	
Lebanon	Beirut	Beirut–Rafic Hariri International Airport	Terminated	
Macau	Macau	Macau International Airport	Terminated	
Malaysia	Alor Setar	Sultan Abdul Halim Airport		
Malaysia	Bakalalan	Ba'kelalan Airport	Terminated	
Malaysia	Bario	Bario Airport	Terminated	
Malaysia	Belaga	Belaga Airport	Terminated	
Malaysia	Bintulu	Bintulu Airport		
Malaysia	Ipoh	Sultan Azlan Shah Airport	Terminated	
Malaysia	Johor Bahru	Senai International Airport		
Malaysia	Kapit	Kapit Airport	Terminated	
Malaysia	Kota Bharu	Sultan Ismail Petra Airport		
Malaysia	Kota Kinabalu	Kota Kinabalu International Airport		
Malaysia	Kuala Lumpur	Kuala Lumpur International Airport	Hub	
Malaysia	Kuala Lumpur	Sultan Abdul Aziz Shah Airport	Terminated	
Malaysia	Kuala Terengganu	Sultan Mahmud Airport		
Malaysia	Kuantan	Sultan Haji Ahmad Shah Airport		
Malaysia	Kuching	Kuching International Airport		
Malaysia	Kudat	Kudat Airport	Terminated	
Malaysia	Labuan	Labuan Airport		
Malaysia	Lahad Datu	Lahad Datu Airport	Terminated	
Malaysia	Langkawi	Langkawi International Airport		
Malaysia	Lawas	Lawas Airport	Terminated	
Malaysia	Limbang	Limbang Airport	Terminated	
Malaysia	Long Banga	Long Banga Airport	Terminated	
Malaysia	Long Lellang	Long Lellang Airport	Terminated	
Malaysia	Long Pasia	Long Pasia Airport	Terminated	
Malaysia	Long Semado	Long Semado Airport	Terminated	
Malaysia	Long Seridan	Long Seridan Airport	Terminated	
Malaysia	Marudi	Marudi Airport	Terminated	
Malaysia	Miri	Miri Airport		
Malaysia	Mulu	Mulu Airport	Terminated	
Malaysia	Mukah	Mukah Airport	Terminated	
Malaysia	Penang	Penang International Airport		
Malaysia	Sandakan	Sandakan Airport		
Malaysia	Semporna	Semporna Airport	Terminated	
Malaysia	Sibu	Sibu Airport		
Malaysia	Tawau	Tawau Airport		
Malaysia	Tommanggong	Tommanggong Airport	Terminated	
Maldives	Malé	Velana International Airport		
Mauritius	Port Louis	Sir Seewoosagur Ramgoolam International Airport	Terminated	
Mexico	Mexico City	Mexico City International Airport	Terminated	
Myanmar	Yangon	Yangon International Airport		
Nepal	Kathmandu	Tribhuvan International Airport		
Netherlands	Amsterdam	Amsterdam Airport Schiphol	Terminated	
New Zealand	Auckland	Auckland Airport		
New Zealand	Christchurch	Christchurch Airport	Terminated	
Pakistan	Karachi	Jinnah International Airport	Terminated	
Philippines	Cebu	Mactan–Cebu International Airport	Terminated	
Philippines	Davao	Francisco Bangoy International Airport	Terminated	
Philippines	Manila	Ninoy Aquino International Airport		
Philippines	Zamboanga	Zamboanga International Airport	Terminated	
Qatar	Doha	Hamad International Airport		
Saudi Arabia	Dammam	King Fahd International Airport	Terminated	
Saudi Arabia	Jeddah	King Abdulaziz International Airport		
Saudi Arabia	Medina	Prince Mohammad bin Abdulaziz International Airport		
Singapore	Singapore	Changi Airport		
South Africa	Cape Town	Cape Town International Airport	Terminated	
South Africa	Johannesburg	O. R. Tambo International Airport	Terminated	
South Korea	Busan	Gimhae International Airport	Resumes 2 December 2026	
South Korea	Seoul	Gimpo International Airport (Note: Was replaced by Incheon International Airport as Seoul's main international airport in late March 2001.)	Terminated	
South Korea	Seoul	Incheon International Airport		
Spain	Madrid	Madrid–Barajas Airport	Terminated	
Sri Lanka	Colombo	Bandaranaike International Airport		
Sweden	Stockholm	Stockholm Arlanda Airport	Terminated	
Switzerland	Zurich	Zurich Airport	Terminated	
Taiwan	Kaohsiung	Kaohsiung International Airport	Terminated	
Taiwan	Taipei	Taoyuan International Airport		
Thailand	Bangkok	Don Mueang International Airport (Note: Except for a small number of low-cost carriers, the airport was closed in 2006 for all scheduled commercial traffic in favour of Suvarnabhumi Airport.)	Terminated	
Thailand	Bangkok	Suvarnabhumi Airport		
Thailand	Chiang Mai	Chiang Mai International Airport		
Thailand	Hat Yai	Hat Yai International Airport	Terminated	
Thailand	Krabi	Krabi International Airport	Terminated	
Thailand	Phuket	Phuket International Airport		
Turkey	Istanbul	Atatürk Airport	Terminated	
Turkey	Istanbul	Sabiha Gökçen International Airport ^{Charter}	Terminated	
United Arab Emirates	Dubai	Al Maktoum International Airport	Terminated	
United Arab Emirates	Dubai	Dubai International Airport	Terminated	
United Kingdom	Belfast	Belfast International Airport	Terminated	
United Kingdom	Edinburgh	Edinburgh Airport	Terminated	
United Kingdom	Glasgow	Glasgow Airport	Terminated	
United Kingdom	London	Heathrow Airport		
United Kingdom	Manchester	Manchester Airport	Terminated	
United Kingdom	Teesside	Teesside International Airport	Terminated	
United States	Los Angeles	Los Angeles International Airport	Terminated	
United States	New York City	John F. Kennedy International Airport	Terminated	
United States	Newark	Newark Liberty International Airport	Terminated	
Uzbekistan	Tashkent	Tashkent International Airport	Begins 5 December 2026	
Vietnam	Da Nang	Da Nang International Airport		
Vietnam	Hanoi	Noi Bai International Airport		
Vietnam	Ho Chi Minh City	Tan Son Nhat International Airport		

== See also ==
- Transport in Malaysia
