= List of airports in Malaysia =

This is a list of airports in Malaysia, sorted by state or territory.

== Airports ==
In total, Malaysia has 90 airports (39 in East Malaysia and 51 in Peninsular Malaysia (all that have existed)). Among them, 38 airports have scheduled passenger service on commercial airlines (shown in bold). Other than that, Malaysia has 12 international airports (existing).

City	IATA	ICAO	Airport	Status	Notes
**JOHOR**					
Batu Pahat		WMAB	UTHM Tanjung Laboh Airport	Active	Functional for UTHM flight training and private charters
Felda Air Tawar 2, Kota Tinggi		MY-0039	Felda Air Tawar Airstrip	Closed	Historical agricultural strip
Felda Lok Heng, Kota Tinggi		My-0040	Felda Lok Heng Airstrip	Active	owned by FELDA
Felda Semenchu, Bandar Penawar		My-0041	Felda Semenchu Airstrip	Inactive	Historical agricultural strip
Kluang		WMAP	Kluang Airport	Active	Restricted to ATM
Kong Kong		WMAO	Kong Kong Airstrip	Closed	Due to industrial takeover, safety and modernization
Labis		WMAQ	Labis Airport	Active	Non-Commercial
Mersing	MEP	WMAU	Mersing Airport	Closed	
Muar		WMAV	Muar / Bakri Airport	Active	Restricted to PDRM PGU
Segamat		WMAZ	Segamat Airport	Active	Non-Comercial
Senai (near Johor Bahru)	JHB	WMKJ	**Senai International Airport**	Active	International Airport.
Sungai Tekai	GTK		Sungai Tekai Airport	Active	Non-Cormercial
**KEDAH**					
Alor Setar	AOR	WMKA	**Sultan Abdul Halim Airport** / RMAF Alor Setar	Active	Domestic Airport
Langkawi	LGK	WMKL	**Langkawi International Airport**	Active	International Airport
Sungai Petani		WMBB/MY-0053	Sungai Petani Airport	Closed	Redeveloped into residential areas
Sungai Petani			Sungei Petani Airstrip	Active	Restricted to ATM
**KELANTAN**					
Gong Kedak		WMGK	RMAF Gong Kedak	Active	Restricted to RMAF
Kota Bharu	KBR	WMKC	**Sultan Ismail Petra International Airport**	Active	International Airport.
Kuala Gris		WMCA	Kuala Gris Airstrip	Closed	Abandoned
**KUALA LUMPUR**					
Sungai Besi		WMKF/WMKS(RMAF and PDRM PGU)	Simpang International Airport/RMAF Kuala Lumpur/PDRM PGU Semenanjung	Closed	Making way for Bandar Malaysia
**LABUAN**					
Labuan	LBU	WBKL	**Labuan Airport** / RMAF Labuan	Active	Domestic Airport
**MALACCA**					
Batu Berendam	MKZ	WMKM	**Malacca International Airport**	Active	International Airport
**NEGERI SEMBILAN**					
Bahau		WMAA	Bahau Airport	Closed	Making way for IOI Bahau
**PAHANG**					
Benta		WMAC	Benta Airport	Closed.	Demolished and Abandoned due to Economic Viability
Bentong		WMAD	Bentong Airport	Closed.	Demolished and Repurposed into Bentong Golf Club in 1970
Cameron Highlands		MY-0003	Cameron Highlands Airstrip	Closed.	
Kuala Lompat		WMAK	Kuala Lompat Airstrip	Closed.	Reclaimed by the Krau Wildlife Reserve rainforest due to strictly protected
Kuantan	KUA	WMKD	**Sultan Haji Ahmad Shah Airport** / RMAF Kuantan	Active	As a Domestic Airport.
Pekan		WMBP	Pekan Airstrip	Active.	Only for Pahang Royal family and government VIPs.
Taman Negara		WMAN	Sungai Tiang Airstrip	Closed.	Reclaimed by primary rainforest due to environmental protection, shifting to Eco-Tourism, end of the Insurgency
Termeloh		WMBE	Temerloh Airstrip	Active	But owned by Malaysian Armed Forces
Tioman Island	TOD	WMBT	Tioman Airport	Active	As a STOLport.
**PENANG**					
Bayan Lepas (near George Town)	PEN	WMKP	**Penang International Airport**	Active	International Airport
Butterworth	BWH	WMKB	RMAF Butterworth	Active	Owned by RMAF
**PERAK**					
Bidor		WMAE	Bidor Airport	Closed.	Demolished and Repurposed into Batang Padang Golf Club
Gerik		WMAH	Grik Airstrip/RMAF Gerik	Active	STOLport
Ipoh	IPH	WMKI	**Sultan Azlan Shah International Airport**/RMAF Ipoh/PDRM PGU Ipoh	Active	International Airport.
Jendarata Estate, Teluk Intan		WMAJ	Jendarata Airport	Active	Owned by Jenderata Estate
Kroh		WMBH	Kroh Airstrip	Active	Owned by Malaysian Armed Forces and the Royal Malaysian Police
Kroh		WMAI	Kroh Airstrip (Old)	Closed.	Due to safety concerns regarding terrain, security risks during the Insurgency period, and the 1983 administrative renaming of the town.
Lumut		WMLH/WMLT(Tactical)	Lumut Naval Air Station	Active	Owned by Navy
Pangkor Island	PKG	WMPA	Pangkor Airport	Active	STOLport.
Sitiawan	SWY	WMBA	Sitiawan Airport	Active	But restricted
Sitiawan		WMAF	Sitiawan Airport (Old)	Closed.	Redeveloped into the Sitiawan Settlement Museum and surrounding residential areas
Sungkai			Sungkai Airstrip	Closed	Abandoned after the Malayan Emergency
Taiping	TPG	WMBI	Taiping Airport (Tekah Airport)	Active	No commercial flights
Ulu Bernam		WMBF	Ulu Bernam Airstrip	Active	Owned by United Plantations Berhad
**PERLIS**					
Kangar			Kangar Airstrip	Active	Not Commercial
**PUTRAJAYA**					
Putrajaya		My-0044	Putrajaya Recreational Airport	Active	But restricted
**SABAH**					
Kota Kinabalu	BKI	WBKK	**Kota Kinabalu International Airport**/PDRM PGU Kota Kinabalu		
Kudat	KUD	WBKT	Kudat Airport		
Lahad Datu	LDU	WBKD	**Lahad Datu Airport**		
Long Pasia	GSA	WBKN	Long Pasia Airport		
Pamol	PAY	WBKP	Hutan Bakau Pamol Airport		
Ranau	RNU	WBKR	Ranau Airport		
Sahabat	SXS	WBKH	Sahabat Airport	Active	Owned by FELDA
Sandakan	SDK	WBKS	**Sandakan Airport**		
Semporna	SMM	WBKA	Semporna Airport		
Sepulot	SPE	WBKO	Sepulot Airport		
Sipitang	SPT		Sipitang Airport		
Swallow Reef	LAC		Layang-Layang Airport		
Tawau	TWU	WBKW	**Tawau Airport**		
Tommanggong	TMG	WBKM	Tommanggong Airport		
**SARAWAK**					
Ba'kelalan	BKM	WBGQ	**Ba'kelalan Airport**		
Bario	BBN	WBGZ	**Bario Airport**		
Belaga	BLG	WBGC	Belaga Airport	Closed	Under Planning
Bintulu	BTU	WBGB	**Bintulu Airport**	Active	Domestic Airport
Kapit	KPI	WBGP	Kapit Airport		
Kuching	KCH	WBGG	**Kuching International Airport /** RMAF Kuching/PDRM PGU Kuching		
Lawas	LWY	WBGW	**Lawas Airport**		
Limbang	LMN	WBGJ	**Limbang Airport**		
Long Akah	LKH	WBGL	**Long Akah Airport**		
Long Atip		WBGA	Long Atip Airport	Closed.	
Long Banga	LBP		**Long Banga Airport**		
Long Geng		WBGE	Long Geng Airport	Closed	Submerged in Bakun Dam
Long Lellang	LGL	WBGF	**Long Lellang Airport**	Active	STOLport
Long Semado	LSM	WBGD	Long Semado Airport	Closed.	
Long Seridan	ODN	WBGI	**Long Seridan Airport**		
Long Sukang	LSU	WBGU	Long Sukang Airport		
Lutong		WMLU	Lutong Airport		
Marudi	MUR	WBGM	**Marudi Airport**		
Miri	MYY	WBGR	**Miri Airport**/PDRM PGU Miri		
Mukah	MKM	WBGK	**Mukah Airport**		
Mulu	MZV	WBMU	**Mulu Airport**		
Sematan	BSE	WBGN	Sematan Airport		
Sibu	SBW	WBGS	**Sibu Airport**		
Sri Aman	SGG	WBGY	Simanggang Airport		
Tanjung Manis, Mukah	TGC	WBGT	**Tanjung Manis Airport**		
**SELANGOR**					
Jugra		WMBJ	Jugra Airstrip	Active	Owned by RMAF
Seri Keledang		WMBR	Bernam River Airfield	Active	Owned by Bernam River Flying Club.
Ladang Lima Belas		My-0038	Ladang Lima Blas Airstrip	Active	Owned by United Plantations Berhad
Sepang, Selangor	KUL	WMKK	**Kuala Lumpur International Airport**	Active	International Airport
Subang (outskirts of Shah Alam, Subang Jaya and Petaling Jaya)	SZB	WMSA/WMSB(for RMAF)	**Sultan Abdul Aziz Shah International Airport** / RMAF Subang/PDRM PGU Subang	Active	International Airport.
**TERENGGANU**					
Kerteh	KTE	WMKE	Kerteh Airport	Active	Owned by Petronas
Kuala Dungun		WMAG	Dungun Airport	Closed.	Repurposed into Dungun Golf & Country Club
Kuala Terengganu	TGG	WMKN	**Sultan Mahmud Airport**	Active	Domestic/International(Sometimes) Airport
Pulau Kucing		WMBC	Pulau Kucing airstrip	Inactive	Airstrip never built
Redang Island	RDN	WMPR	Redang Airport	Active	STOLport
Perhentian Islands		WMPB	Berhentian Airport	Inactive	Airstrip never built
