= SKS Airways =

Malaysian airline

IATA	ICAO	Call sign
KI	SJB	SOUTHERN TIGER
- Founded: 13 November 2017; 8 years ago
- Commenced operations: 25 January 2022; 4 years ago
- Ceased operations: January 16, 2025; 20 months ago
- Hubs: Sultan Abdul Aziz Shah Airport
- Fleet size: 1
- Destinations: 3
- Parent company: SKS Group
- Key people: Dato' Rohman Ahmad (Director)
- Website: www.sksairways.com

SKS Airways was a regional airline based in Johor Bahru, Malaysia. Founded in November 2017, the airline received its Air Operator's Certificate (AOC) in October 2021 and began its first commercial operations on 25 January 2022, with a flight from Subang to Pangkor. Its flights were suspended starting November 2023, and the company announced they would cease operations after nearly two years of operation on January 16, 2025, due to failing to sustain the market.

== History ==
=== Early operations and fleet development ===
Founded in November 2017, SKS Airways received its Air Operator's Certificate (AOC) in October 2021 and commenced its first commercial flight from Subang to Pangkor on 25 January 2022. The airline added its first DHC 6-300 Twin Otter to its fleet on 15 July 2019, followed by a second Twin Otter on 23 December 2020.

In 2021, reports indicated that SKS Airways was planning to order ATR 72-500 aircraft, as job postings for ATR72-500 pilots and cabin crew appeared online, and the aircraft was featured in a Malaysia Independence Day advertisement. However, these plans did not come to fruition, and there have been no further mentions of the ATR aircraft since.

=== Lease agreement and operational challenges ===
On 25 May 2023, SKS Airways signed a lease agreement for ten Embraer E195-E2 aircraft with Azorra Aviation during the Langkawi International Maritime & Aerospace Exhibition (LIMA). The airline also entered into a long-term services agreement with Embraer for spare parts, parts repair, maintenance and fleet monitoring. These aircraft were intended to support the airline's regional expansion based at Kuala Lumpur's Subang Airport.

However, on 20 November 2023, SKS Airways suspended all flights. While the online booking portal remained active, no flights were available for booking. The New Straits Times reported that the airline was under significant financial strain due to unprofitable operations and limited funding sources. Despite SKS Airways denying financial difficulties, they did not provide reasons for halting operations.

On 10 July 2024, SKS Airways announced it had canceled its plans to lease the Embraer E195-E2 jets from Azorra Aviation. This decision came after failing to secure a sufficient number of slots at Kuala Lumpur Subang Airport to support jet operations. The original agreement with Azorra and Embraer in May 2023 aimed to introduce the E195-E2s by early 2024 to drive new growth opportunities.

== Destinations ==
Prior to November 2023, SKS Airways served the following scheduled passenger destinations:

Country	State	City	Airport	Notes	Reference
Malaysia	Pahang	Tioman Island	Tioman Airport		
Malaysia	Selangor	Kuala Lumpur	Sultan Abdul Aziz Shah Airport		
Malaysia	Terengganu	Redang Island	Redang Airport		
Malaysia	Perak	Pangkor Island	Pangkor Airport	Terminated	

== Fleet ==
=== Current fleet ===
As of July 2026, SKS Airways operates the following aircraft:

SKS Airways Fleet
Aircraft	In service	Orders	Passengers	Notes
De Havilland DHC 6-300 Twin Otter	1	-	19	

=== Former fleet ===
As of May 2023, the SKS Airways operated 2 De Havilland Canada DHC-6 Twin Otter.
