= WMAQ =

WMAQ may refer to:

- WMAQ-TV, a TV station in Chicago, U.S.
- WSCR, a radio station in Chicago, U.S., former call sign WMAQ (1922–2000)
- WKQX (FM), a radio station in Chicago, U.S., former call sign WMAQ-FM (1948–74)
- WMAQ. an ICAO airport code for Labis Airport, Johor, Malaysia
