= WBGP =

WBGP may refer to:

- WBGP (FM), a radio station (91.3 FM) licensed to Moultrie, Georgia, United States
- WBGP (The CW Plus), a cable television licensed to Long Beach, Mississippi
- Kapit Airport (ICAO code WBGP)
