= WBKM =

WBKM may refer to:

- WBKM-LP, a defunct television station(channel 46) formerly licensed to serve Chana, Illinois; an America One affiliate
- WWFK, a radio station (107.1 FM) licensed to serve Dannemora, New York, United States, which held the call sign WBKM from 2016 to 2017
- Tommanggong Airport (ICAO code WBKM), Sabah, Malaysia
