= WBGN =

WBGN may refer to:

- WBGN (FM), a former radio station (102.3 FM) licensed to serve Munfordville, Kentucky, United States
- WBVR (AM), a radio station (1340 AM) licensed to serve Bowling Green, Kentucky, United States, which held the call sign WBGN from 1959 to 2025
- Sematan Airport (ICAO code WBGN)
