= WBKA =

WBKA may refer to:

- WBKA (FM), a radio station (107.7 FM) licensed to serve Bar Harbor, Maine, United States
- WCBZ-CD, a low-power television station (channel 28, virtual 22) licensed to Bucyrus, Ohio, United States that held the call signs WBKA-LP or WBKA-CA from 1995 to 2009
- Semporna Airport (ICAO code WBKA)
