= Jenderata Estate =

Large palm oil estate, in Malaysia

Coordinates: 3°54′45″N 100°56′42.72″E

Jendarata in Bagan Datuk District

Jenderata Estate (Chinese: 仁拿打园丘) is a large palm oil estate in Bagan Datuk District, Perak, Malaysia. Established in 1906, it is owned by United Plantations. It has been converted partly to cocoa cash crops.

It was the first estate to have a football club enter the professional M-League. Formed as the Jenderata FC in 2004, the team became the UPB-MyTeam FC in 2006.

It has its own small airstrip, known as Jendarata Airport.
