= Long Geng Airport =

- IATA: none; ICAO: WBGE

Summary
- Airport type: Public
- Operator: Malaysia Airports Berhad
- Serves: Belaga, Sarawak, Malaysia
- Time zone: MST (UTC+08:00)
- Elevation AMSL: 350 ft / 107 m
- Coordinates: 02°37′N 114°08′E

Map
- Location in East Malaysia
- Source: Great Circle Mapper

Long Geng Airport (ICAO: WBGE) is located in Long Geng, Malaysia. There are no scheduled flights at this airport.

== See also ==
- List of airports in Malaysia
