= List of airports in Brunei =

This list of airports in Brunei contains all airports in the Sultanate of Brunei Darussalam.

== Airports ==
airport name	ICAO	IATA	runway dimensions	city served	district	coordinates
Brunei International Airport	WBSB	BWN	3,685 m × 46 m (12,090 ft × 151 ft)	Bandar Seri Begawan	Brunei-Muara	04°56′39″N 114°55′42″E
Anduki Airfield	WBAK	KUB	820 m × 32 m (2,690 ft × 105 ft)	Seria / Anduki	Belait	04°38′12″N 114°22′52″E

== See also ==
- Transport in Brunei
- List of airports by ICAO code: W#WB - Brunei and Malaysia
- Wikipedia:WikiProject Aviation/Airline destination lists: Asia#Brunei Darussalam
