= Sitiawan Airport =

Airport in Manjung, Perak, Malaysia

Sitiawan Airport Lapangan Terbang Sitiawan
- IATA: SWY; ICAO: WMBA

Summary
- Operator: Department of Civil Aviation Malaysia
- Serves: Sitiawan
- Location: Sitiawan, Perak, Malaysia
- Time zone: MST (UTC+08:00)
- Elevation AMSL: 25 ft / 8 m
- Coordinates: 04°13′20″N 100°41′57.6″E

Map
- Location in West Malaysia

Runways
Direction	Length		Surface
Direction	m	ft	Surface
03/21	549	1,801	Grass
- Sources: AIP Malaysia

Sitiawan Airport (IATA: SWY, ICAO: WMBA) is an airport in Sitiawan, Manjung, Perak, Malaysia. The airport complements the existing Pangkor Airport.

== History ==
Construction began in late 1993 at a cost of RM 25 million, using an existing airstrip converted into a 1,350 metre runway.

== See also ==
- List of airports in Malaysia
