= Jendarata Airport =

Airport in Bagan Datuk, Perak, Malaysia

Jenderata Airport Lapangan Terbang Jenderata
- IATA: none; ICAO: WMAJ

Summary
- Airport type: Private
- Operator: United Plantations
- Serves: Teluk Intan, Malaysia
- Location: Bagan Datuk District, Malaysia
- Time zone: MST (UTC+08:00)
- Elevation AMSL: 8 ft / 2 m
- Coordinates: 03°53′59″N 100°56′55″E

Map
- Location in West Malaysia

Runways
Direction	Length		Surface
Direction	m	ft	Surface
03/21	830	2,723	Paved
- Source: AIP Malaysia

Jendarata Airport (ICAO: WMAJ) is a private airport located in the Jendarata town of Bagan Datuk District, Perak, Malaysia and near Hutan Melintang, in Perak. The airport is owned and operated by the plantation company United Plantations, which started their venture into plantations with the opening of the estate in 1906.

There are no scheduled flights into this airport; it is used by private aeroplanes and all operations require prior permission from the company.

== See also ==
- List of airports in Malaysia
