= Sematan Airport =

- IATA: BSE; ICAO: WBGN

Summary
- Airport type: Private
- Operator: Malaysia Airports Berhad
- Serves: Sematan, Sarawak, Malaysia
- Time zone: MST (UTC+08:00)
- Coordinates: 01°48′49″N 109°45′46″E

Map
- Location in East Malaysia
- Source: Great Circle Mapper

Sematan Airport (IATA: BSE, ICAO: WBGN) is located in Sematan, Lundu District, Sarawak, Malaysia.

== History ==
The Sematan airfield was officiated in September 1958 where Borneo Airways Twin Pioneer was the first aircraft landed here.

There are no scheduled flights at this airport. The fact that this airport is for RMAF. In 1974 there was a helicopter crash killing 2 or 3 generals. From then, no more than one high tanking officer was allowed per helicopter.

== See also ==
- List of airports in Malaysia
