= Taiping Airport =

Airport in Perak, Malaysia

Taiping Aerodrome Lapangan Terbang Taiping
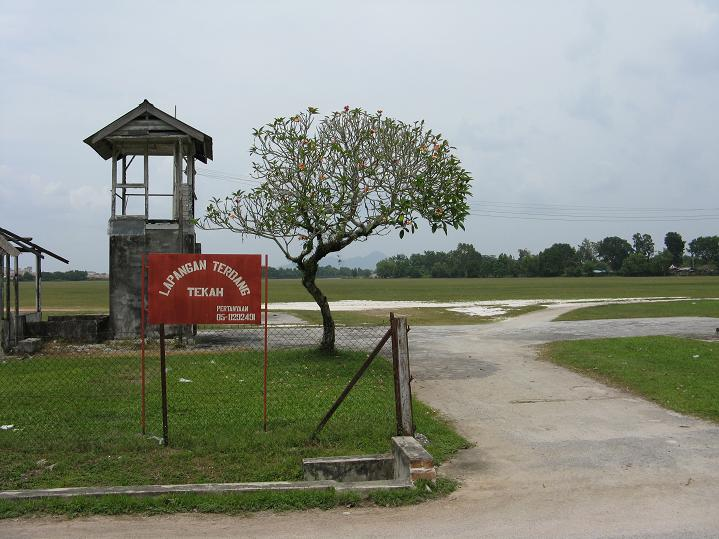
- IATA: TPG; ICAO: WMBI

Summary
- Airport type: Military/Public
- Operator: Flytrike Sdn Bhd
- Serves: Taiping, Malaysia
- Time zone: MST (UTC+08:00)
- Elevation AMSL: 40 ft (12 m)
- Coordinates: 04°51′49″N 100°42′55″E

Map
- Location in West Malaysia

Runways
Direction	Length		Surface
Direction	m	ft	Surface
18/36	1,320	4,331	Concrete/Grass
- Source: AIP Malaysia

Taiping Aerodrome (IATA: TPG, ICAO: WMBI) is an aerodrome in Taiping, Larut, Matang and Selama, Perak, Malaysia. It is located at Jalan Muzaffar Shah formerly Creagh Road, Assam Kumbang and also called Tekah Airstrip. The airport was built in early 1929, this wooden structure aerodrome was the first airfield in the state of Perak and also in Peninsular Malaysia.

Taiping Airport is the oldest airstrip in Malaysia. It was built by the British in 1929 for non-military use. Along with Alor Setar Airport which was built in the same year, it was one of the earliest airports in Malaya. However, in 1933, more airports were built in Singapore, Selangor and Penang, and Taiping Airport was no longer important.

In February 2007, the airport was chosen to be the hub for the Global Flying Hospitals, GFH. However, in July 2007, it was decided that Taiping Airport was not suitable as the flying hub, and the Chairman of GFH, Neill Newton, announced a new location will be selected, but not in Malaysia.

Since 2024, the airport has been the host airstrip of the annual Taiping Air Festival (also known as the Festival Udara Taiping), hosted by its current operator and major tenant Flytrike.

== History ==
The Taiping Airport which is located in Assam Kumbang is also called Tekah Airport. The airport was built in 1929 and claimed as the first airport officially established in Federated Malay States and also in South East Asia. The airport was not as important when compared to other airports that were established after the first at Taiping. Besides serving as a commercial airport for the use of the British officers and European merchants, it also served as the airstrip for the Royal Malaysian Air Force (RMAF). The airport served short-distance destinations such as to Alor Star, Kuala Lumpur and Penang. The Penang to Singapore flight routes runs a daily stop by at the Taiping Airport. The first Malaya airway company, the Wearne Air Service Company made a daily flight to Taiping, to deliver newspapers to the town. After the end of the Japanese Occupation, flight to other Malay states were cancelled, and the airport only served flights to airports within the Perak state; only Ipoh Airport was authorized to serve flights to other states. The airport also achieved fame through the famous American aviator, Amelia Earhart, in 1937, when she was doing her world flight. Amelia Earhart was flying between Thailand and Singapore and permission to land at Taiping Airport was granted on 7 June 1937 by the then Resident-General of Malaya. The airport was also significant in the history of Malaysia when Sukarno and Mohammad Hatta, who later became the president and vice-president of Indonesia, landed at the airport on 12 August 1945 for a meeting with Dr. Burhanuddin al-Helmy and Ibrahim Yaakub who were leaders of a political party named KRIS to talk about the possibility of joining Malaya with Indonesia when Indonesia achieved independence. The meeting was arranged by the Japanese officers during World War II. However, the plan was never put into place and Indonesia announced its independence without Malaya.

In February 2007, the Chief State Minister of Perak, Datuk Seri Tajol Rosli Mohd Ghazali announced that the airport had been chosen as the hub for Global Flying Hospitals (GFH), which is an international organization that brings humanitarian medical support to developing nations. However, the plan was not carried out, because the runway at the airport was too short (about 200 feet long) to accommodate the GFH's planes, as the GFH is using the Airbus A320. The GFH is now stationed at Subang Airport.

On 22 August 2014, a military EC725 Super Cougar owned by the Royal Malaysian Air Force bringing funeral victims of Malaysia Airlines Flight 17, arrived and landed safely in Taiping Airport at 12:35 PM for victim burial at Al-Hidayah Muslim Cemetery.

In recent years, Taiping Airport has been operated by Flytrike Sdn Bhd, and is utilized as an airstrip specifically for light-sport aircraft and general aviation activities.

== See also ==
- List of airports in Malaysia
