= Lutong =

Town in Miri

- Town
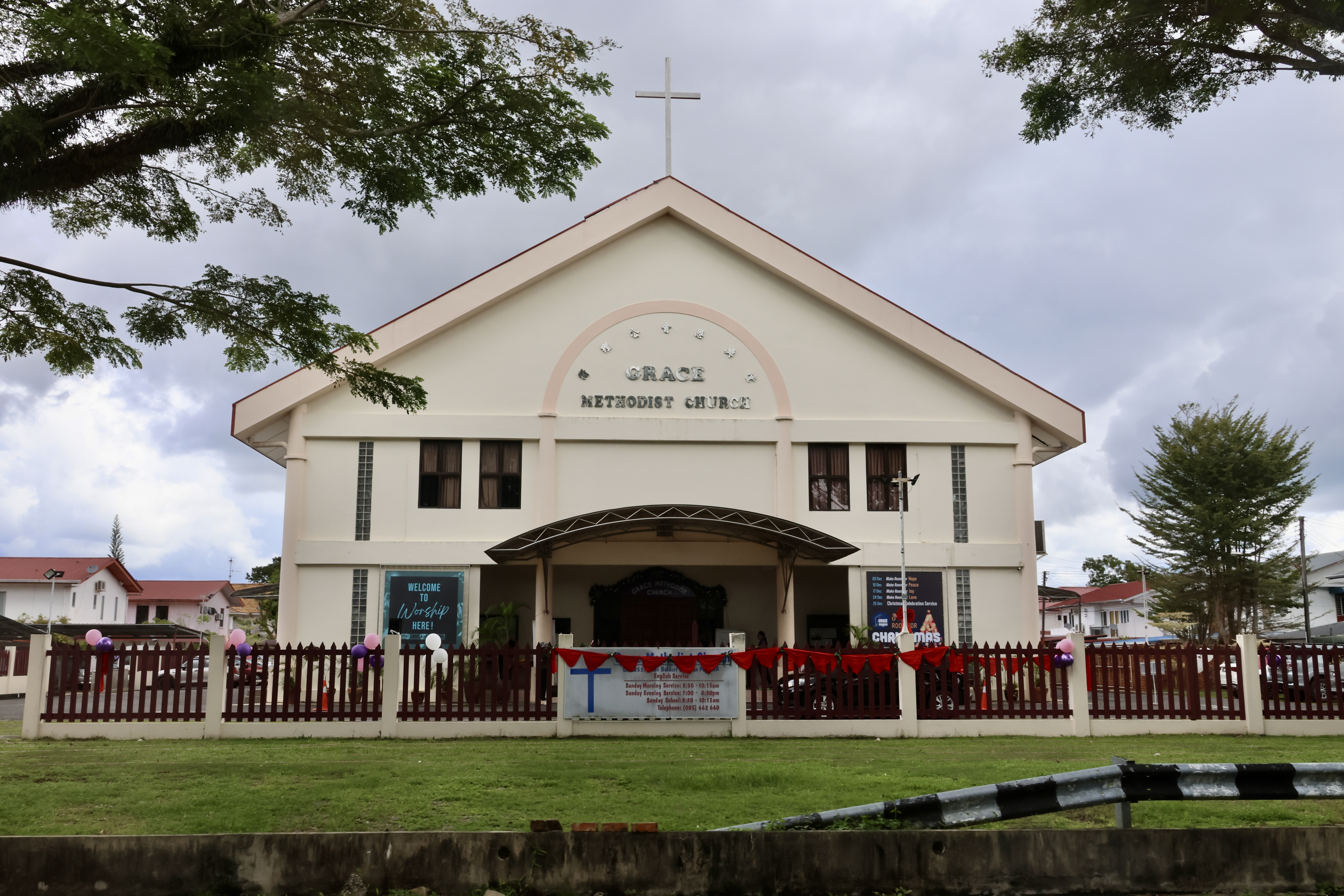
- Grace Methodist Church

- Location within Malaysia
- Coordinates: 4°28′20″N 114°00′39″E
- Country: Malaysia
- State: Sarawak
- Division: Miri
- District: Miri
- Time zone: UTC+8 (MYT)
- Postcode: 98100, 98107, 98109

Lutong is a suburban township in Miri, a city in the state of Sarawak in Malaysia. An oil refinery was built in Lutong by Shell Oil Company. Lutong's economy is generated mainly from staff of the oil and gas companies located nearby.

== History ==
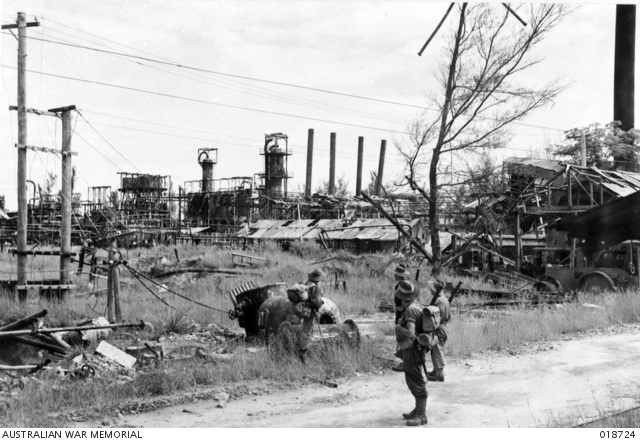
Australian soldiers inspecting a damaged oil refinery in 1945

On 23 June 1945, the Australian Army landed and took control of the oil refinery and airstrip in three hours, with little resistance from the 553rd Independent Infantry Battalion. It was thought that a week earlier, the Japanese garrison had left the region and moved 6 kilometres (3.7 mi) to the southwest of Lutong, toward Miri. With the capture of Lutong, the Australians have gained control over the entire west coast of Borneo, extending our reach 80 miles (130 km) below Brooketon on the tip of the Brunei, where they landed just 12 days ago. They have also cut off the enormously valuable oilfield of Seria and placed the Australians across the main Japanese line of retreat down the coast.

The key to the main oil fields on the west coast was Lutong. After being processed there, the oil from Seria was sent via sea lines to ships. The Japanese made every effort to further the development of Seria, which has the potential to be the largest field in the British Empire. They also made great efforts to maintain the Lutong refinery, which employed over 200 Indian POWs and an unknown number of Javanese as forced labor. Huge quantities of machinery and other equipment were also brought by them. The refinery had been completely destroyed by intense Allied bombing for several months, and the airstrip on which they landed had also been abandonment by the Japanese a few months prior, when the Australians burst into Lutong on Wednesday morning.

Allied bombs had damaged the hangar and the huts, but the field had fared better than the Labuan or Brunei strips, and it could be restored fast and simply. When the Australians arrived at Lutong, 135 Indian POWs, including Sikhs and Punjabis, were released. They were taken prisoner upon Singapore's collapse and sent to Lutong to labor in the refineries. They displayed symptoms of semi-starvation, maltreatment, and neglect spanning three years. and several were discovered by their patrols within the compound, so frail they were unable to leave.

== Transportation ==
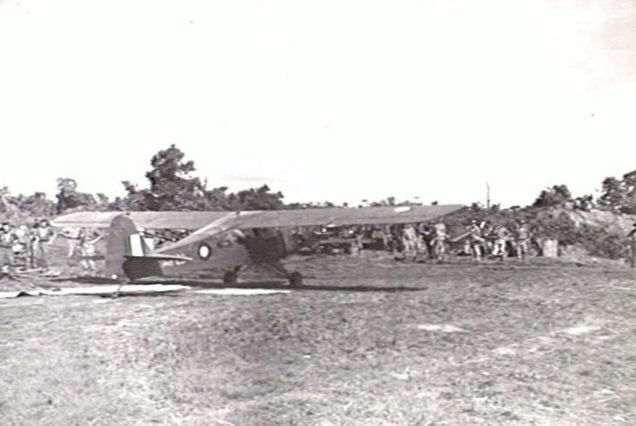
RAAF Taylorcraft Auster at Lutong airstrip in July 1945

=== Road ===
Drivers who wish to avoid the excessive traffic on the main routes have taken to using Lutong Beach Road. Additionally, and sporadically, vehicles on this route from Lutong to Miri across the Piasau bridge have a nice glimpse of the sea. It used to be the sole path that connected Brunei with Miri. The beach was more resilient to the weight of the cars that were traveling through it to get to both locations back then. In 2021, emergency construction to construct a 185 metres (607 ft) gabion wall was initiated as a temporary solution to prevent waves from Lutong Beach each from further damaging the coastline road near the Lutong Old Airport.

=== Water ===
In the Second World War, soldiers and equipment were transported over rivers using jetties equipped with ferries (operated by the 2/13th Battalion). A Westland Hovercraft was seen skimming onto Lutong Beach. Since there were no concrete roads, the only way to go from Lutong to Kuala Belait was to take boats across the Baram and Belait rivers and utilise the sandy beach.

=== Air ===
Lutong Airstrip is a remnant of the Japanese occupation of World War II, with them operating Nakajima Ki-43s on the airstrip. It was repeatedly bombed by allied forces during the Japanese occupation. It was later captured by the Australians to allow reconnaissance aircraft such as the Taylorcraft Austers, to land. After being restored and put into service in 1954, when Malayan Airways expanded its Borneo service air network, the airstrip began to receive commercial passenger planes. This continued until the runway at Miri Airport was constructed.

== Infrastructure ==
Royal Dutch Shell constructed the first oil refinery in Sarawak in Tanjung Lobang, and then relocated it to Lutong. West Lutong discharged its first extract of foreign oil in 1968. The first refinery in Malaysia, Shell's Lutong Refinery, received MS-ISO 9002-1991 certification from SIRIM in 1993. In 1996, the Lutong Refinery became the second refinery in shell and the first in Malaysia to hold the record of holding no lost time injuries after ten years. The Lutong Refinery in Miri was shut down in June 2003, having been in operation since 1917 and having gone 17 years without a license to operate.

=== Religion ===
Grace Methodist Church is a large membership organisation that is a component of the SCAC (Sarawak Chinese Annual Conference) under the General Conference of the Malaysian Methodist Church. Another church, Good Shepherd Church Lutong, also sits within the area.

=== Places of interest ===
Lutong Beach is a beachfront located in front of the former Lutong Airfield. A botched effort at building a breakwater resulted in the numerous concrete pillars that protrude chaotically from the shorelines along the beach front. Piasau is a short drive away, and the beach is reachable from the roadside. Having been frequently battered by powerful waves in 2022, the beach started to show signs of wear and tear. Sea debris and logs that were carried ashore by heavy waves at high tide during the previous several days are all over the beach and the adjacent regions, including the roadways.

== See also ==
- Atago Maru
