= Belaga Airport =

Belaga Airport Lapangan Terbang Belaga
- IATA: BLG; ICAO: WBGC

Summary
- Airport type: Public
- Operator: Malaysia Airports Berhad
- Serves: Belaga, Sarawak, Malaysia
- Time zone: MST (UTC+08:00)
- Elevation AMSL: 200 ft / 61 m
- Coordinates: 02°38′10″N 113°45′38″E

Map
- Location in Sarawak, East Malaysia BLG/WBGC (East Malaysia) BLG/WBGC (Malaysia) BLG/WBGC (Southeast Asia) BLG/WBGC (Asia)

Runways
| Direction | Length | | Surface |
| Direction | m | ft | Surface |
|---|---|---|---|
| 05/23 | 427 | 1,401 | Bitumen |
- Source: AIP Malaysia

Belaga Airport (IATA: BLG, ICAO: WBGC) is an airport in Belaga, Sarawak, Malaysia.

== Airlines and destinations ==
Following the takeover routes by MASwings from FlyAsianXpress, the Bintulu-Belaga route has been ceased.

== See also ==
- List of airports in Malaysia
