= Mulu Airport =

Airport in Sarawak, Malaysia

Mulu Airport Lapangan Terbang Mulu
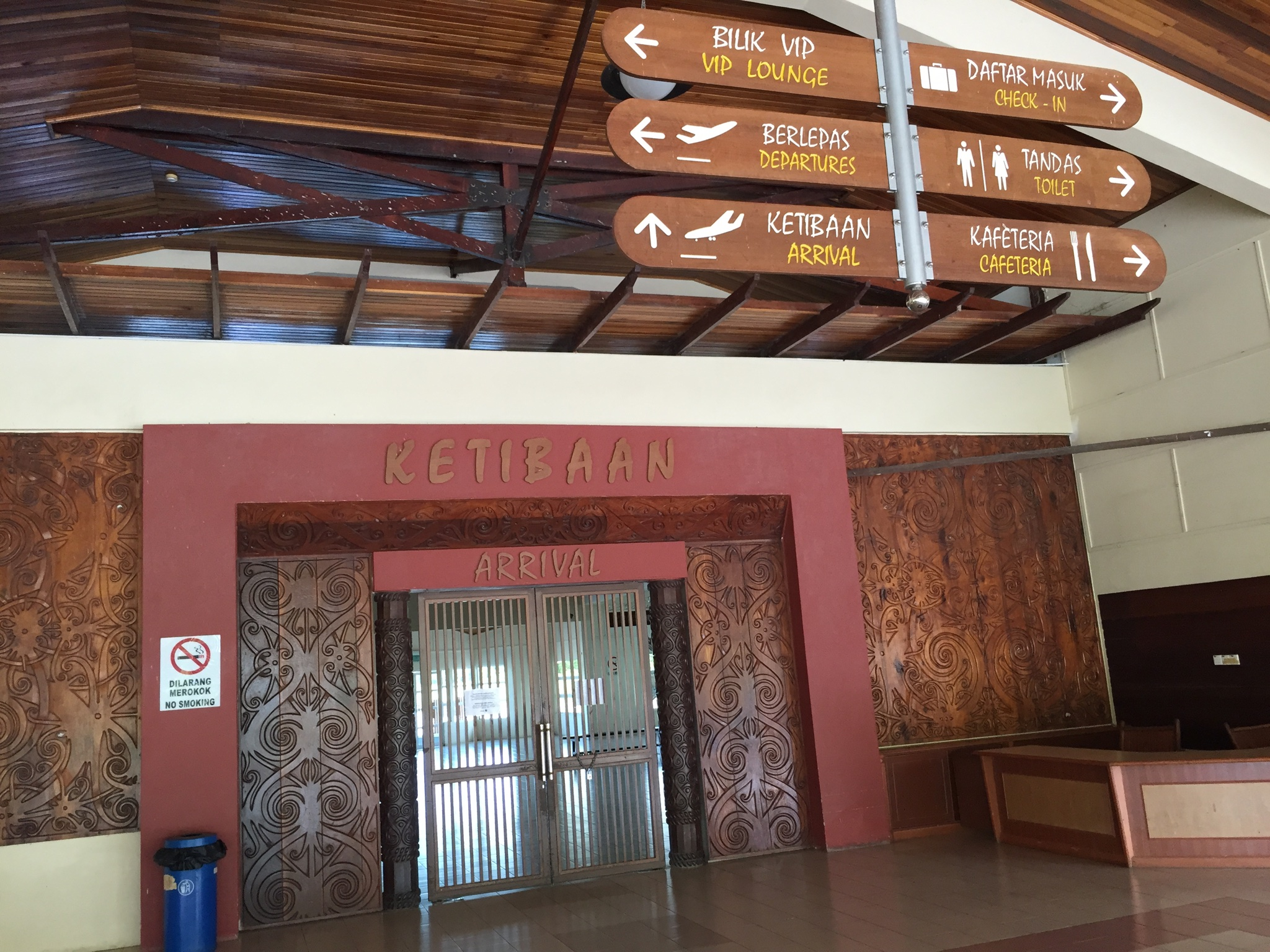
- IATA: MZV; ICAO: WBMU

Summary
- Airport type: Public
- Owner: Government of Malaysia
- Operator: Malaysia Airports Berhad
- Serves: Gunung Mulu National Park, Sarawak, East Malaysia
- Location: Mulu, Sarawak, East Malaysia
- Time zone: MST (UTC+08:00)
- Elevation AMSL: 80 ft / 24 m
- Coordinates: 04°03′02″N 114°48′33″E

Maps
- Sarawak state in Malaysia

- Location on Mulu Borneo, in Sarawak, East Malaysia, Malaysia MZV/WBMU (East Malaysia) MZV/WBMU (Malaysia) MZV/WBMU (Southeast Asia) MZV/WBMU (Asia)

Runways
Direction	Length		Surface
Direction	m	ft	Surface
03/21	1,500	4,921	Bitumen

Statistics (2023)
- Passenger: 72,150 (▲15.4%)
- Airfreight (tonnes): 247 (▲7.9%)
- Aircraft movements: 2,824 (▲3.8%)
- Sources: MAHB and AIP Malaysia

Mulu Airport (IATA: MZV, ICAO: WBMU) is an airport in the state of Sarawak in Malaysia and a gateway to the Gunung Mulu National Park. There are resort accommodations at the national park, but the nearest villages are Long Terawan, downstream 21.7 km (13.5 mi) to the west, and Long Atip 26.1 km (16.2 mi) to the south. Rumah Bawang Grang in Brunei is only 23.1 km (14.4 mi) to the north-northwest, but there is no road connected to the airport.

== Airlines and destinations ==
Airlines	Destinations
AirBorneo	Kota Kinabalu, Kuching, Miri

== Traffic and statistics ==
Annual passenger numbers and aircraft statistics
Year	Passengers handled	Passenger % change	Cargo (tonnes)	Cargo % change	Aircraft movements	Aircraft % change
2011	67,041	Steady	370	Steady	1,920	Steady
2012	49,670	▼25.9	322	▼13.0	1,780	▼7.3
2013	49,432	▼0.5	354	▲9.9	2,306	▲29.6
2014	60,761	▲22.9	319	▼9.9	2,739	▲18.8
2015	51,387	▼15.4	232	▼27.3	2,385	▼12.9
2016	60,074	▲16.9	391	▲68.5	2,389	▲0.2
2017	62,656	▲4.3	315	▼19.4	2,231	▼6.6
2018	57,574	▼8.1	299	▼5.1	2,318	▲3.9
2019	59,501	▲3.3	304	▲1.7	2,800	▲20.8
2020	17,917	▼69.9	111	▼63.5	1,218	▼56.5
2021	11,304	▼36.9	108	▼2.7	722	▼40.7
2022	62,497	▲452.9	229	▲112.0	2,720	▲276.7
2023	72,150	▲15.4	247	▲7.9	2,824	▲3.8
^{Source: Ministry of Transport (Malaysia)}

== See also ==
- List of airports in Malaysia
