= Long Semado Airport =

Long Semado Airport Lapangan Terbang Long Semado (No longer in operation closed down 4 years ago)
- IATA: LSM; ICAO: WBGD

Summary
- Airport type: Public
- Operator: Malaysia Airports Sdn. Bhd.
- Serves: Long Semado, Sarawak, Malaysia
- Time zone: MST (UTC+08:00)
- Elevation AMSL: 2,150 ft / 655 m
- Coordinates: 04°12′59″N 115°34′58″E

Map
- Location in Sarawak, East Malaysia LSM/WBGD (East Malaysia) LSM/WBGD (Malaysia) LSM/WBGD (Southeast Asia) LSM/WBGD (Asia)

Runways
Direction	Length		Surface
Direction	m	ft	Surface
02/20	487	1,598	Crushed Stone
- Source: AIP Malaysia

Long Semado Airport (IATA: LSM, ICAO: WBGD) is an airport serving Long Semado in the state of Sarawak in Malaysia. There are no scheduled flights at this airport.

== See also ==
- List of airports in Malaysia
