= Pangkor Airport =

Airport in Manjung, Perak, Malaysia

Pangkor Airport Lapangan Terbang Pangkor
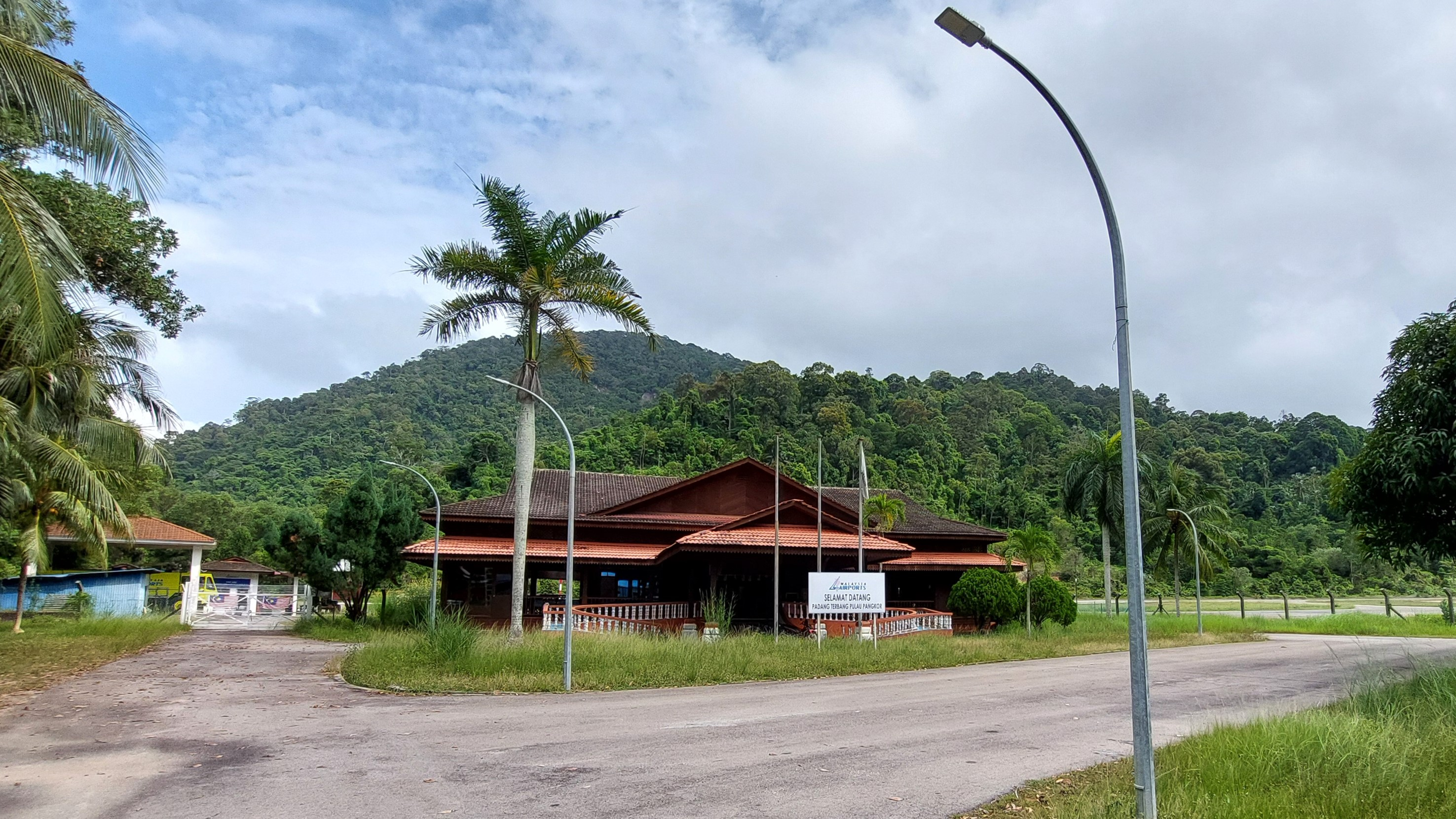
- IATA: PKG; ICAO: WMPA

Summary
- Airport type: Public
- Owner: Government of Malaysia
- Operator: Malaysia Airports Berhad
- Serves: Pangkor, Perak, Malaysia
- Location: Pangkor Island, Perak, West Malaysia
- Time zone: MST (UTC+08:00)
- Elevation AMSL: 19 ft / 6 m
- Coordinates: 04°14′41″N 100°33′12″E

Maps
- Perak State in Malaysia

- Location in Pangkor Island, Perak, Peninsular Malaysia, Malaysia PKG /WMPA (Peninsular Malaysia) PKG /WMPA (Malaysia) PKG /WMPA (Southeast Asia) PKG /WMPA (Asia)

Runways
Direction	Length		Surface
Direction	m	ft	Surface
04/22	792	2,598	Semi Grout

Statistics (2012)
- Passengers: 4,068
- Passenger change 11-12: ▲643.7%
- Aircraft movements: 324
- Movements change 11-12: ▲912.5%
- Source: AIP Malaysia

Pangkor Airport (IATA: PKG, ICAO: WMPA) is an airport on Pangkor Island, Manjung District, Perak, Malaysia.

The airport is complemented by Sitiawan Airport located in the mainland.

== History ==
In 1970, the Perak state government studied a site for an airstrip, located near the government rest house at Pasir Bogak. The 2,500 feet (760 m) airstrip would be used by light aircraft and helicopters.

Plans to construct the airport – then only an airstrip – were announced in 1984.

The airport was expected to be completed in July 1992, but was delayed to January 1993.

Technical defects on the airstrip were discovered in May 1993, delaying the airport's opening to June. At that time, the airstrip could only fit the 12-seater Dornier and Twin Otter.

== Traffic and statistics ==
Annual passenger numbers and aircraft statistics
Year	Passengers handled	Passenger % Change	Aircraft Movements	Aircraft % Change
2003	6,095	Steady	657	Steady
2004	10,247	▲68.1	698	▲6.2
2005	11,193	▲9.2	752	▲7.7
2006	9,866	▼11.9	541	▼28.1
2007	8,906	▼9.7	589	▲8.9
2008	8,132	▼8.7	545	▼7.5
2009	7,617	▼6.3	502	▼7.9
2010	2,588	▼66.0	174	▼65.3
2011	547	▼78.9	32	▼81.6
2012	4,068	▲643.7	324	▲912.5

Busiest routes out of Pangkor Airport by frequency
Rank	Destinations	Frequency (Weekly)|

== See also ==
- List of airports in Malaysia
