= Bernam River Airfield =

- IATA: none; ICAO: WMBR

Summary
- Airport type: Private
- Owner: Private
- Operator: Private
- Serves: Slim River & Northern Kuala Lumpur, West Malaysia
- Location: Hulu Selangor, Selangor, Malaysia
- Time zone: MST (UTC+08:00)
- Elevation AMSL: 56 ft / 17 m
- Coordinates: 03°45′58″N 101°19′8″E
- Website: https://web.archive.org/web/20120405204337/http://www.bernamriver.com/

Map
- Location in West Malaysia

Runways
Direction	Length		Surface
Direction	ft	m	Surface
16/34	2,200	671	Tarmac
- Source: official web site

Bernam River Airfield (ICAO: WMBR) is an airport located in Hulu Selangor District, Selangor, Malaysia.

Bernam River Airfield (BRA) is the first private airpark in the country. The airport which covers an area of 221 acres (89 ha), was built to provide infrastructure for the general aviation (GA) industry in Malaysia. The recent increase in air traffic at the Subang Airport and the imminent closure of the Sungei Besi Air Base (WMKF) has accelerated the need for an alternative site for light aircraft to operate.
