= Long Pasia Airport =

Long Pasia Airport Lapangan Terbang Long Pasia
- IATA: GSA; ICAO: WBKN

Summary
- Airport type: Public
- Operator: Malaysia Airports Berhad
- Serves: Long Pasia, Sabah, Malaysia
- Time zone: MST (UTC+08:00)
- Elevation AMSL: 3,175 ft / 968 m
- Coordinates: 04°24′34″N 115°43′28″E

Map
- Location in Malaysia

Runways
Direction	Length		Surface
Direction	m	ft	Surface
18/36	610	2,001	Grass over gravel
- Source: AIP Malaysia

Long Pasia Airport (IATA: GSA, ICAO: WBKN) is an airport serving Long Pasia in the state of Sabah in Malaysia.

== See also ==
- List of airports in Malaysia
