= Lutong Airport =

Former airport of Miri, Malaysia

Lutong Airport Lutong Airstrip
- IATA: ~~LUT~~; ICAO: ~~WMLU~~

Summary
- Serves: Lutong, Miri, Sarawak, Borneo
- Time zone: MST (UTC+08:00)
- Coordinates: 04°27′17″N 114°00′13″E

Map
- Location in Borneo

Runways
Direction	Length		Surface
Direction	m	ft	Surface
~~11/29~~

Lutong Airport ~~(IATA: LUT, ICAO: WMLU)~~ was an airport serving Lutong, a satellite town north of Miri, Sarawak, Malaysia. The airstrip used to belong to Royal Dutch Shell. It was opened during World War II and renovated in 1954, and it continued to operate until the inauguration of the new Miri Airport during the 1980s. The airport was decommissioned in the early 2000s and its terminal and hangars have been demolished, with only the landing strip preserved. The strip was used for racing until the deteriorating condition of the strip rendered it unsuitable for car drag racing.
