= Semporna Airport =

Semporna Airport Lapangan Terbang Semporna
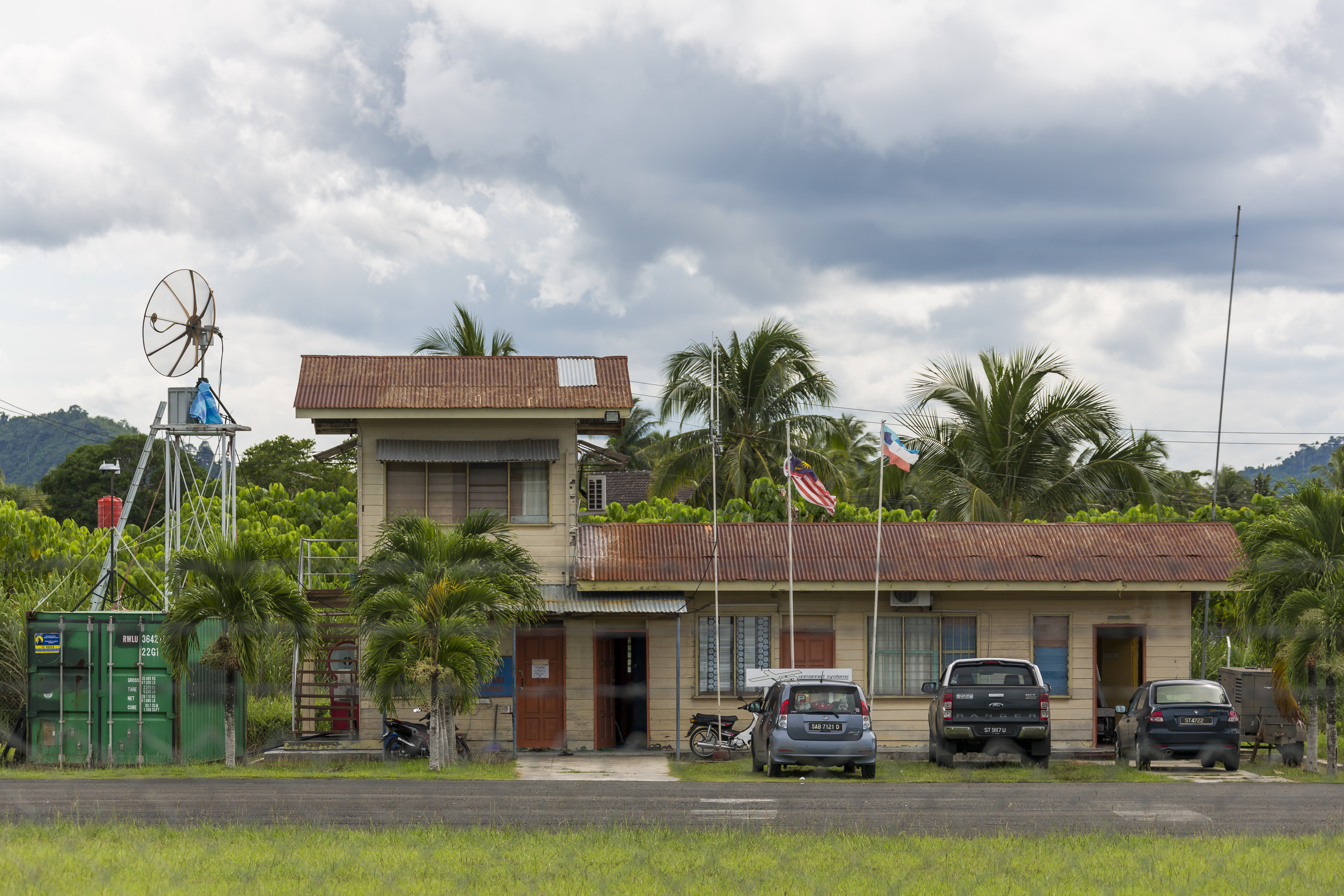
- IATA: SMM; ICAO: WBKA

Summary
- Airport type: Public
- Operator: Malaysia Airports Berhad
- Serves: Semporna, Sabah, Malaysia
- Time zone: MST (UTC+08:00)
- Elevation AMSL: 60 ft / 18 m
- Coordinates: 04°26′59″N 118°35′47″E

Map
- Location in East Malaysia

Runways
Direction	Length		Surface
Direction	m	ft	Surface
18/36	609	1,998	Gravel
- Source: AIP Malaysia

Semporna Airport (IATA: SMM, ICAO: WBKA) is an airport serving the town of Semporna in the east Malaysian state of Sabah. At present, the airport is not served by any commercial civilian flights.

== See also ==
- List of airports in Malaysia
