= United Plantations =

Malaysia-based oil palm plantation company

United Plantations Berhad
- Company type: Public limited company
- Traded as: MYX: 2089
- ISIN: MYL2089OO000
- Industry: Agriculture
- Founded: 1917
- Headquarters: Teluk Intan, Perak, Malaysia
- Key people: Johari Mat, Chairman; Carl Bek-Nielsen, Chief Executive Director
- Website: www.unitedplantations.com

United Plantations Berhad (MYX: 2089) is a Malaysia-based oil palm plantation company.

== History ==
United Plantations Limited was founded in 1917 through the amalgamation of several existing plantations. The company was listed on the Copenhagen Stock Exchange on February 28, 1932. In 1962, United Plantations Ltd. was merged with Bernam Oil Palms Ltd. under the present name, United Plantations Berhad, which was then listed on the Kuala Lumpur Stock Exchange in 1969.

== Present Operations ==
Across their various estates in Malaysia and Indonesia United Plantations had 45,810 hectares of oil palm planted as of their 2013 annual report. An additional 3,090 hectares in Malaysia was planted with coconut.
