= Tommanggong Airport =

Tommanggong Airport Lapangan Terbang Tommanggong
- IATA: TMG; ICAO: WBKM

Summary
- Airport type: Public
- Operator: Tommanggong Estate
- Serves: Tommanggong, Sabah, Malaysia
- Time zone: MST (UTC+08:00)
- Elevation AMSL: 26 ft / 8 m
- Coordinates: 05°23′59″N 118°38′47″E

Map
- Location in East Malaysia

Runways
Direction	Length		Surface
Direction	m	ft	Surface
11/29	670	2,198	Gravel
- Source: AIP Malaysia

Tommanggong Airport (IATA: TMG, ICAO: WBKM) was an airport in Tommanggong in Kinabatangan District, Sabah, Malaysia. The airport permitted landings on runway 11 only and departures on 29.

The airport has been decommissioned and is no longer in use.

== Former airlines and destinations ==
FlyAsianXpress used to fly to Tommanggong Airport from Sandakan Airport. When MASwings took over the operation, they ended the Sandakan-Tommanggong route and hence there is no scheduled commercial airlines currently flying to the airport. There are no plans to restart the air service between Sandakan and Tomanggong as the current method of access would be via estate gravel road belonging to Hap Seng Plantation Holdings Berhad, under their Tomanggong Group of Estates. This airport is accessible via roads leading to Tagas Estate and Litang Estate from Sungai Segama Group of Estates via a ferry crossing.

== See also ==
- List of airports in Malaysia
