= Sematan =

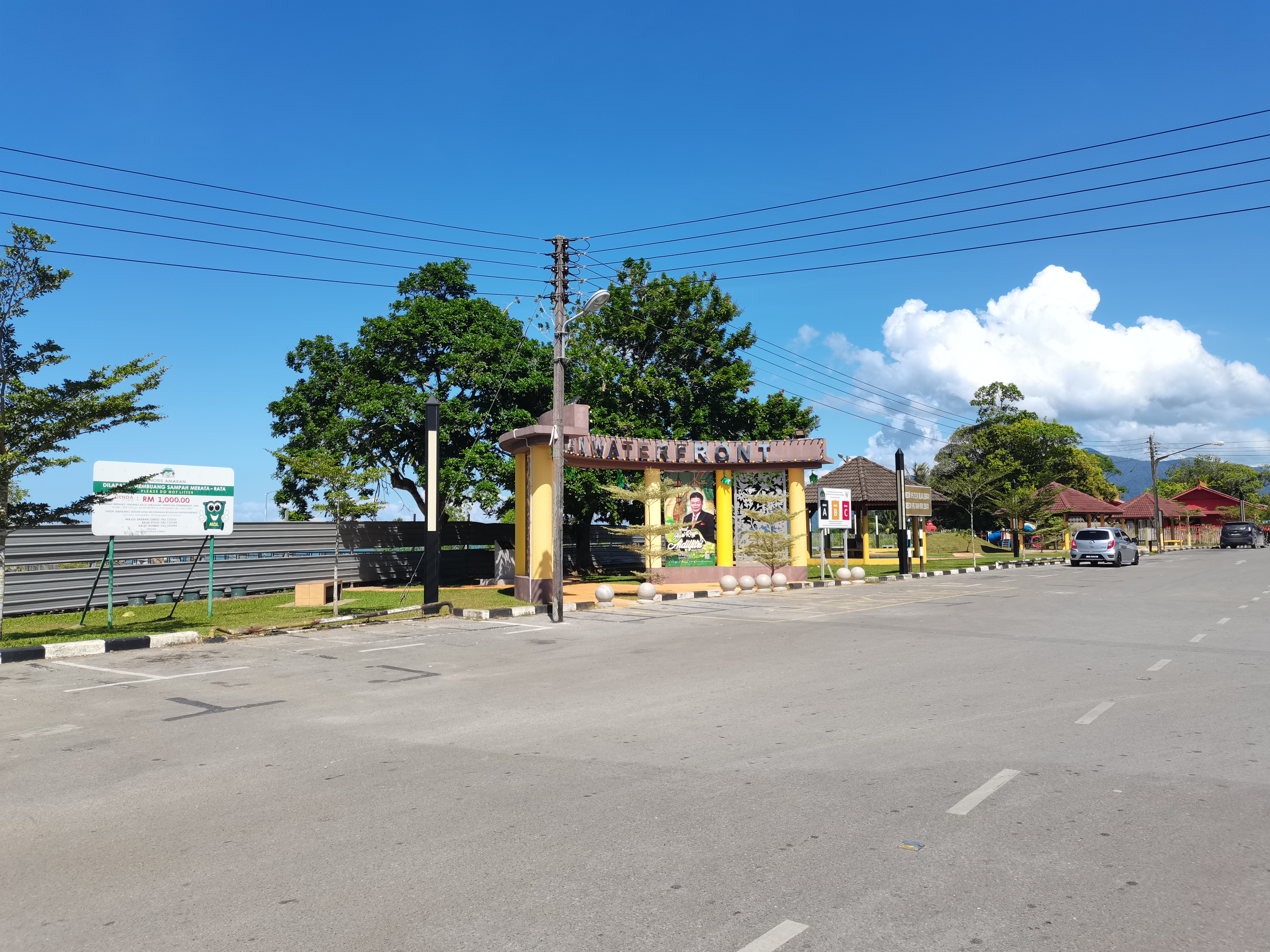
- The Sematan town waterfront

- Location within Borneo
- Coordinates: 1.800°N 109.767°E
- Country: Malaysia
- State: Sarawak
- Administrative Division: Lundu
- Elevation: 1 m (3.3 ft)
- Website: lundudc.sarawak.gov.my

Sematan (known historically as Simatan) is a small town in Lundu District, Sarawak, Malaysia. It lies approximately 67.5 kilometres (42 mi) west-north-west of the state capital Kuching, which is a two-hour drive.

Sematan is a fishing village looking out over the South China Sea. It has reasonably clean beaches, a promenade along the waterfront and a concrete pier into the sea. At the north end, there is a park celebrating early Malay fishermen in the Sematan area. Accommodation in Sematan can be had at the Sematan Hotel.

== Local bus ==
| Route No. | Operating Route | Operator | Remark |
|---|---|---|---|
| K26 | Kuching-Bau-Lundu-Sematan | CPL | |

== Climate ==
Sematan has a tropical rainforest climate (Af) with heavy to very heavy rainfall year-round and with extremely heavy rainfall in January and February.

Climate data for Sematan
| Month | Jan | Feb | Mar | Apr | May | Jun | Jul | Aug | Sep | Oct | Nov | Dec | Year |
|---|---|---|---|---|---|---|---|---|---|---|---|---|---|
| Mean daily maximum °C (°F) | 29.3 (84.7) | 29.6 (85.3) | 30.5 (86.9) | 31.5 (88.7) | 31.9 (89.4) | 31.7 (89.1) | 31.5 (88.7) | 31.4 (88.5) | 31.2 (88.2) | 31.2 (88.2) | 30.8 (87.4) | 30.2 (86.4) | 30.9 (87.6) |
| Daily mean °C (°F) | 25.8 (78.4) | 26.1 (79.0) | 26.5 (79.7) | 27.2 (81.0) | 27.4 (81.3) | 27.3 (81.1) | 27.0 (80.6) | 27.0 (80.6) | 26.9 (80.4) | 26.9 (80.4) | 26.7 (80.1) | 26.4 (79.5) | 26.8 (80.2) |
| Mean daily minimum °C (°F) | 22.4 (72.3) | 22.6 (72.7) | 22.6 (72.7) | 22.9 (73.2) | 23.0 (73.4) | 22.9 (73.2) | 22.6 (72.7) | 22.6 (72.7) | 22.6 (72.7) | 22.7 (72.9) | 22.6 (72.7) | 22.6 (72.7) | 22.7 (72.8) |
| Average rainfall mm (inches) | 754 (29.7) | 680 (26.8) | 407 (16.0) | 189 (7.4) | 132 (5.2) | 109 (4.3) | 139 (5.5) | 148 (5.8) | 162 (6.4) | 233 (9.2) | 290 (11.4) | 539 (21.2) | 3,782 (148.9) |
Source: Climate-Data.org

== Attractions and recreational spots ==
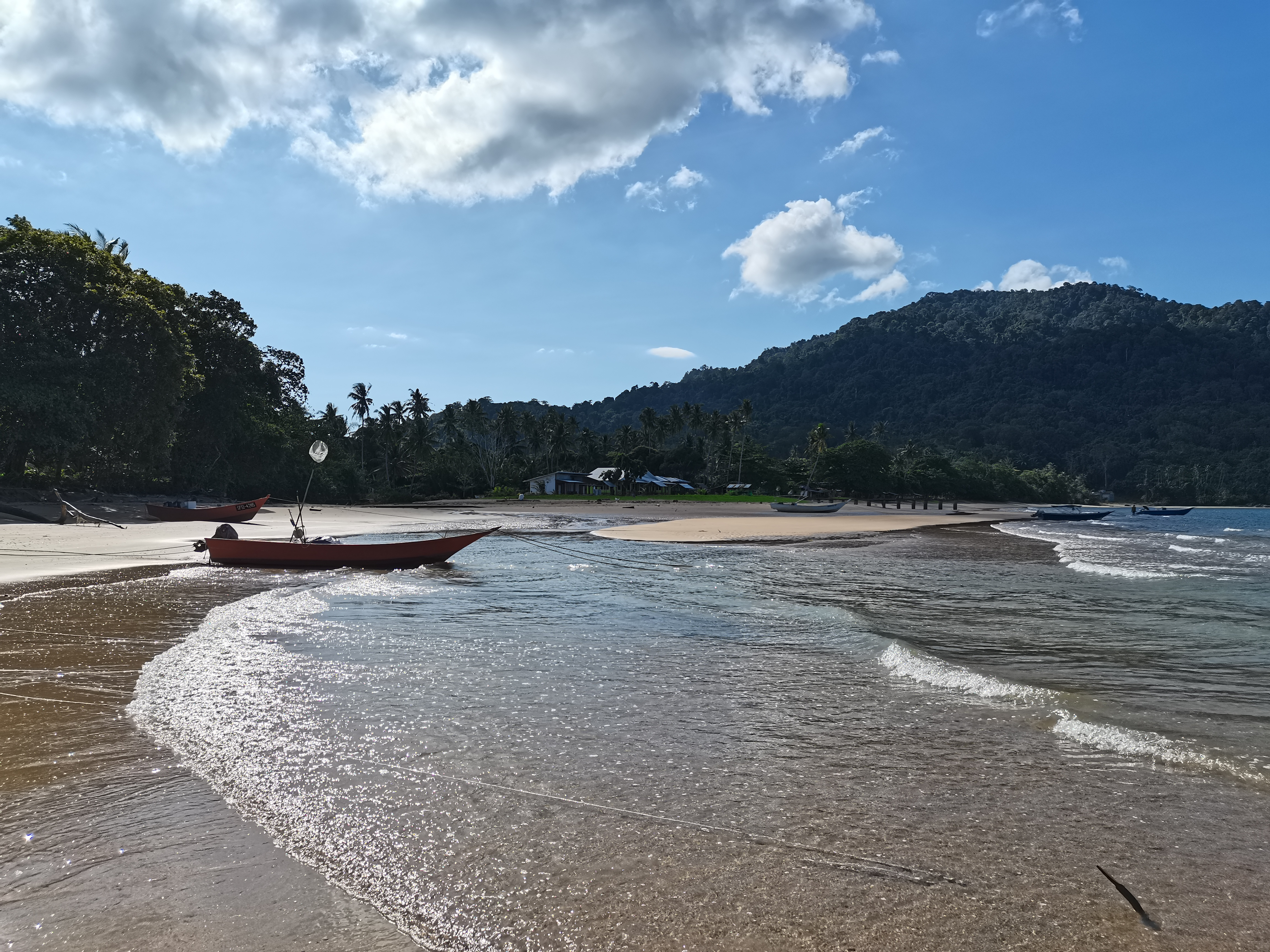
Fishing boats at the Telok Melano beach.

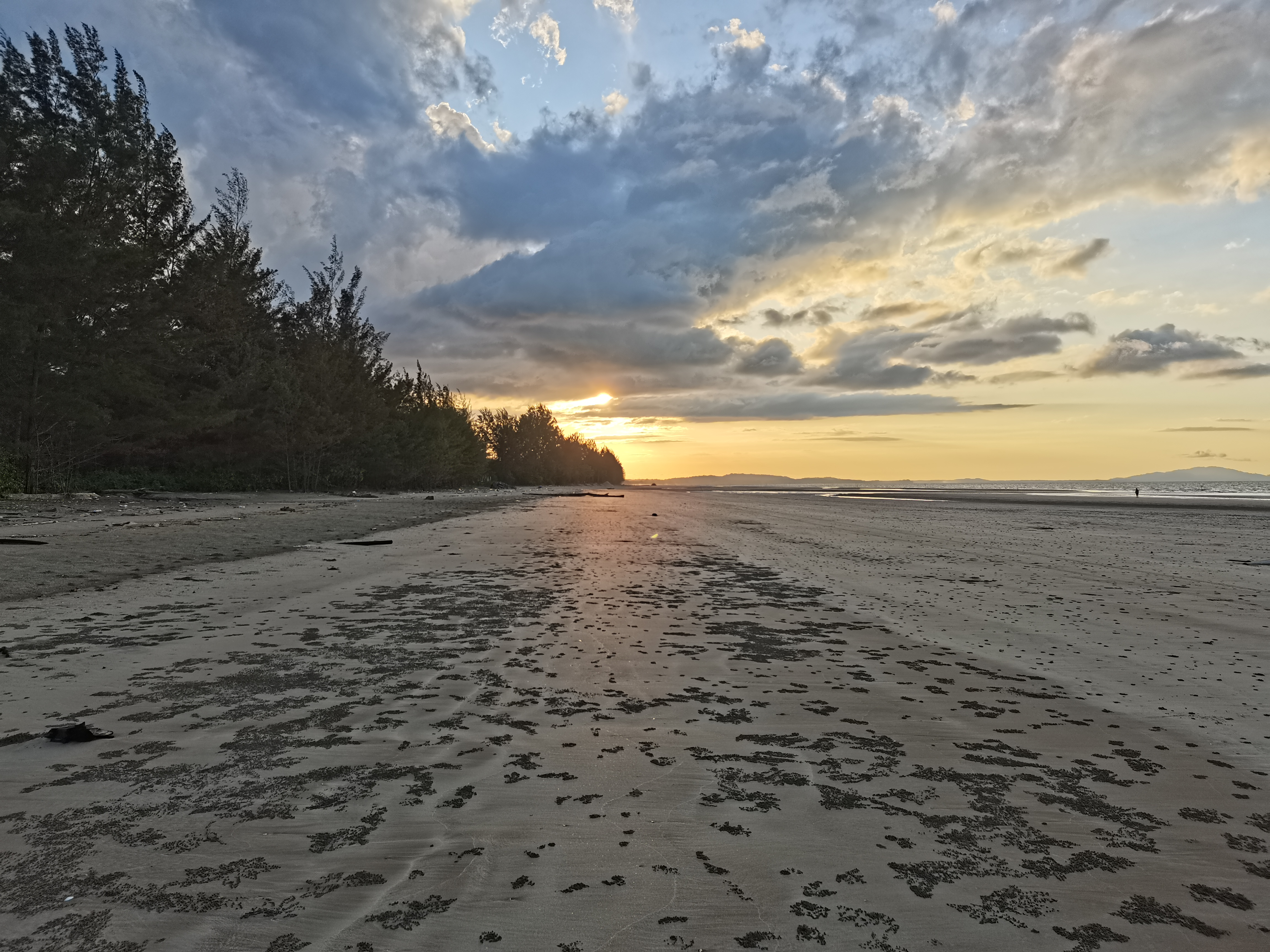
Sunset at Palm Beach Resort Sematan.

Telok Melano is located at the southern tip of Sarawak, a 15-minute drive away from the town of Sematan.
