= Kapit Airport =

Kapit Airport Lapangan Terbang Kapit
- IATA: KPI; ICAO: WBGP

Summary
- Airport type: Public
- Operator: Malaysia Airports Berhad
- Serves: Kapit, Sarawak, Malaysia
- Time zone: MST (UTC+08:00)
- Elevation AMSL: 65 ft / 20 m
- Coordinates: 02°00′35″N 112°55′55″E

Map
- Location in East Malaysia

Runways
Direction	Length		Surface
Direction	m	ft	Surface
16/34	427	1,401	Crushed stone
- Source: AIP Malaysia; Great Circle Mapper

Kapit Airport (IATA: KPI, ICAO: WBGP) is an airport serving Kapit, a town in the state of Sarawak in Malaysia. It used to be operated by Malaysia Airlines, using the Twin Otter aircraft. However it was discontinued due to low demands, and the airport was abandoned. Unscheduled helicopter services continued to land at Kapit Airport.

However in 2018, MASwings had announced plans to reinstate services to Kapit, but only when the infrastructure at the current airport site is restored. The announcement is received with mixed response, with comments from Sarawak Deputy Chief Minister, James Jemut Masing citing it as 'outdated idea', and calling for the proposal of building a new airport at Sungai Tunuh area, which can cater ATR aircraft.

== See also ==
- List of airports in Malaysia
