= Kampung Puteh =

- Location within Borneo
- Coordinates: 4.76667°N 115.53333°E
- Country: Malaysia
- State: Sarawak
- Administrative Division: Lawas
- Elevation: 515 m (1,690 ft)

Kampung Puteh is a settlement in the Lawas division of Sarawak, Malaysia. It lies approximately 677.7 kilometres (421 mi) east-north-east of the state capital Kuching.

Neighbouring settlements include:

- Kampung Tagar 1.9 kilometres (1.2 mi) south
- Kampung Pangaleh 10.8 kilometres (6.7 mi) northwest
- Long Sabuloh 14.8 kilometres (9.2 mi) west
- Kampung Belu 14.9 kilometres (9.3 mi) west
- Long Tuma 15.2 kilometres (9.4 mi) west
- Kampung Surabaya 15.7 kilometres (9.8 mi) northwest
- Kampung Sitakong 15.9 kilometres (9.9 mi) northwest
- Kampung Lawas 15.9 kilometres (9.9 mi) northwest
- Kampung Gaya 16.5 kilometres (10.3 mi) northwest
- Lawas 17.5 kilometres (10.9 mi) northwest
