= Pa Brayong =

- Location within Borneo
- Coordinates: 4.45°N 115.51667°E
- Country: Malaysia
- State: Sarawak
- Administrative Division: Lawas
- Elevation: 1,028 m (3,373 ft)

Pa Brayong (also known as Pa Bryong or Pa Berayong) is a settlement in the Lawas division of Sarawak, Malaysia. It lies approximately 658.5 kilometres (409 mi) east-north-east of the state capital Kuching.

Neighbouring settlements include:

- Long Buang 5.9 kilometres (3.7 mi) south
- Long Berayong 6.7 kilometres (4.2 mi) northwest
- Long Sukang 11.7 kilometres (7.3 mi) north
- Long Merarap 12.4 kilometres (7.7 mi) southwest
- Long Lutok 14.1 kilometres (8.8 mi) northwest
- Long Remirang 18.3 kilometres (11.4 mi) northwest
- Long Lopeng 18.9 kilometres (11.7 mi) south
- Long Lapukan 20.5 kilometres (12.7 mi) south
- Punang Terusan 21.6 kilometres (13.4 mi) southeast
- Long Kinoman 23.2 kilometres (14.4 mi) southeast
