= Long Tanid =

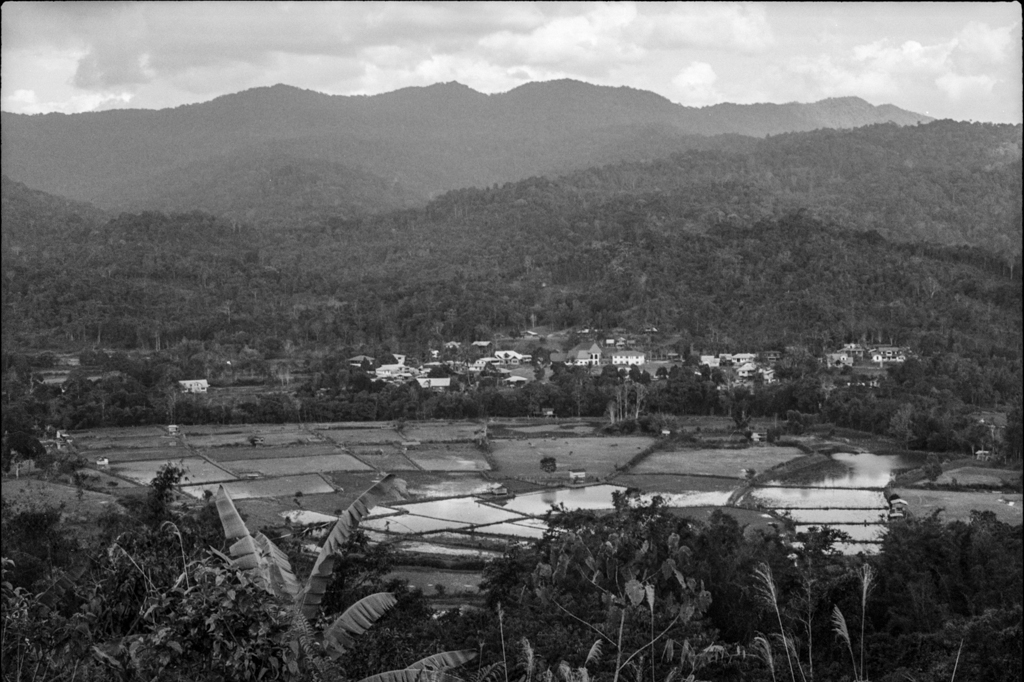
- Rice fields in Long Tanid

- Location within Borneo
- Coordinates: 4.21667°N 115.58333°E
- Country: Malaysia
- State: Sarawak
- Administrative Division: Lawas
- Elevation: 1,231 m (4,039 ft)

Long Tanid (also known as Long Tanla) is a settlement in the Lawas division of Sarawak, Malaysia. It is about 3 hours drive from Lawas just before entering Ba'kelalan.

== Geography ==
Neighbouring settlements include:

- Long Semado Nasab 2.6 kilometres (1.6 mi) northeast
- Long Beluyu 2.6 kilometres (1.6 mi) southwest
- Long Semado 3.7 kilometres (2.3 mi) north
- Long Karabangan 4.1 kilometres (2.5 mi) southwest
- Long Kinoman 6.7 kilometres (4.2 mi) northeast
- Long Lapukan 7.9 kilometres (4.9 mi) northwest
- Punang Terusan 8.3 kilometres (5.2 mi) northeast
- Long Lopeng 13.3 kilometres (8.3 mi) northwest
- Long Ugong 15.3 kilometres (9.5 mi) south
- Budok Aru 18.9 kilometres (11.7 mi) south
