= Long Sukang =

- Location within Borneo
- Coordinates: 4.55°N 115.48333°E
- Country: Malaysia
- State: Sarawak
- Administrative Division: Lawas
- Elevation: 467 m (1,532 ft)

Long Sukang (also known as Sukang) is a Lun Bawang settlement in the Lawas division of Sarawak, Malaysia. It lies approximately 660.7 kilometres (411 mi) east-north-east of the state capital Kuching.

The village has over 60 households, with a total population of about 500. Facilities include a clinic, primary school, a Sidang Injil Borneo (SIB) Church and solar hybrid power. Long Sukang Airport is nearby.

The four villages, Long Lidung, Long Remirang, Puneng Brayong and Long Tuyo are close to Long Sukang, and they all co-operate in social and welfare activities.

The surrounding settlements include:

- Long Lutok 2.6 kilometres (1.6 mi) northwest
- Long Berayong 5.6 kilometres (3.5 mi) south
- Long Remirang 6.7 kilometres (4.2 mi) northwest
- Pa Brayong 11.7 kilometres (7.3 mi) south
- Long Buang 16.8 kilometres (10.4 mi) south
- Long Tengoa 18.2 kilometres (11.3 mi) northwest
- Long Merarap 22.3 kilometres (13.9 mi) south
- Kampung Tagar 22.9 kilometres (14.2 mi) north
- Kampung Kuala Beriwan 23.7 kilometres (14.7 mi) northwest
- Kampung Belu 24.1 kilometres (15.0 mi) northwest
