= Long Remirang =

- Location within Borneo
- Coordinates: 4.6°N 115.45°E
- Country: Malaysia
- State: Sarawak
- Administrative Division: Lawas
- Elevation: 587 m (1,926 ft)

Long Remirang is a settlement in Lawas District, Sarawak, Malaysia. It lies approximately 660.3 kilometres (410 mi) east-north-east of the state capital Kuching.

== Orientation ==
It is one of four villages, Long Lidung, Long Remirang, Puneng Brayong and Long Tuyo, which are close to Long Sukang, and which co-operate in social and welfare activities.

Other neighbouring settlements include:

- Long Lutok 4.1 kilometres (2.5 mi) southeast
- Long Sukang 6.7 kilometres (4.2 mi) southeast
- Long Berayong 11.7 kilometres (7.3 mi) south
- Long Tengoa 13.1 kilometres (8.1 mi) west
- Kampung Kuala Beriwan 17.5 kilometres (10.9 mi) northwest
- Kampung Belu 17.6 kilometres (10.9 mi) north
- Pa Brayong 18.3 kilometres (11.4 mi) southeast
- Kampung Tagar 19.1 kilometres (11.9 mi) northeast
- Long Sabuloh 19.4 kilometres (12.1 mi) north
- Long Tuan 19.7 kilometres (12.2 mi) northwest
