= Long Berayong =

- Location within Borneo
- Coordinates: 4.5°N 115.48333°E
- Country: Malaysia
- State: Sarawak
- Elevation: 911 m (2,989 ft)

Long Berayong (also known as Long Brayong) is a settlement in Sarawak, Malaysia. It lies approximately 657.9 kilometres (409 mi) east-north-east of the state capital Kuching.

Neighbouring settlements include:

- Long Sukang 5.6 kilometres (3.5 mi) north
- Pa Brayong 6.7 kilometres (4.2 mi) southeast
- Long Lutok 7.6 kilometres (4.7 mi) north
- Long Buang 11.3 kilometres (7.0 mi) south
- Long Remirang 11.7 kilometres (7.3 mi) north
- Long Merarap 16.8 kilometres (10.4 mi) south
- Long Tengoa 21.1 kilometres (13.1 mi) northwest
- Long Lopeng 24.1 kilometres (15.0 mi) south
- Long Lapukan 26.6 kilometres (16.5 mi) south
- Kampung Kuala Beriwan 27.5 kilometres (17.1 mi) northwest
