= MRSM Pengkalan Chepa =

MARA Junior Science College Pengkalan Chepa
- Maktab Rendah Sains MARA Pengkalan Chepa
- Kota Bharu, Kelantan, Malaysia

Information
- School type: MRSM, Secondary School, Boarding School
- Motto: Look Ahead, Go Beyond
- Established: February 1973
- Principal: Tuan Haji Ahmad Naszeri bin Salleh
- Vice Principals: Puan Nor Azlyana binti Aziz (Academic Affairs); Encik Nik Mohd Ariff bin Hj. Nik Ab Rahman (Students Affairs); Encik Abang Johanizam bin Abang Robil (Co-Curricular Affairs)
- Head Warden: Encik W. Muhammad Syahmi bin W. Noor Zuhari
- Enrollment: Approximately 250 students every year
- Officiation: 12 August 1975 by HRH Sultan of Kelantan, Ismail Petra of Kelantan
- Website: pchepa.mrsm.edu.my/index.html

Maktab Rendah Sains MARA Pengkalan Chepa, commonly known as MRSM Pengkalan Chepa (formerly known as MRSM Kota Bharu) is the oldest operating pioneer junior science college set up by Majlis Amanah Rakyat or MARA in Malaysia. The slogan of MRSM PENGKALAN CHEPA is #PCNO1 becomes the source of undying motivation to all students.

The college was set up to enable more Bumiputera students to take up and excel in science stream before pursuing courses such engineering, architecture, surveying and medicine at the tertiary level in Malaysian and foreign institutions of higher learning.

== History ==
The college was established in 1973 when it admitted its 149 pioneer students who completed their Malaysian Certificate of Examination in 1977. This college is now known as Maktab Rendah Sains Mara Pengkalan Chepa as the college was built on a 17 acres (69,000 m^{2}) land in Pengkalan Chepa, a suburb located at the outskirt of Kota Bharu. MRSM Kota Bharu was inaugurated on 12 August 1975 by Sultan Yahya Petra.
