= Long Merarap =

- Location within Borneo
- Coordinates: 4.35°N 115.46667°E
- Country: Malaysia
- State: Sarawak
- Administrative Division: Lawas
- Elevation: 486 m (1,594 ft)

Long Merarap is a settlement in the Lawas division of Sarawak, Malaysia. It lies approximately 648.3 kilometres (403 mi) east-north-east of the state capital Kuching.

On 4 May 1963 a Belvedere helicopter crashed near the village of Long Merarap in the Trusan Valley. A patrol from 22 SAS searched for survivors; they found the wreck, but all nine men on the helicopter were dead. The casualties were: Flight-Lieutenant A.P.J. Dodson (RAF), Flight-Lieutenant D.R.E. Viner (RAF), Corporal (Tech) J.L. Williams (RAF), Major H.A.I. Thompson MC (RHF & 22 SAS), Major R.H.D. Norman MBE (Para & 22 SAS), Corporal M.P. Murphy (Para and 22 SAS), Captain J. Conington (RF and 22 SAS), M.H. Day (Foreign Office) and D. Reddish (The Borneo Company).

Neighbouring settlements include:

- Long Buang 6.7 kilometres (4.2 mi) northeast
- Long Lopeng 7.6 kilometres (4.7 mi) south
- Long Lapukan 11.9 kilometres (7.4 mi) southeast
- Pa Brayong 12.4 kilometres (7.7 mi) northeast
- Long Berayong 16.8 kilometres (10.4 mi) north
- Long Semado 17.1 kilometres (10.6 mi) southeast
- Punang Terusan 18.2 kilometres (11.3 mi) southeast
- Long Kinoman 19.1 kilometres (11.9 mi) southeast
- Long Karabangan 19.1 kilometres (11.9 mi) southeast
- Long Semado Nasab 19.7 kilometres (12.2 mi) southeast
