= Long Karabangan =

- Location within Borneo
- Coordinates: 4.2°N 115.55°E
- Country: Malaysia
- State: Sarawak
- Administrative Division: Lawas
- Elevation: 1,734 m (5,689 ft)

Long Karabangan is a settlement in the Lawas division of Sarawak, Malaysia. It lies approximately 648.8 kilometres (403 mi) east-north-east of the state capital Kuching.

Neighbouring settlements include:

- Long Beluyu 1.9 kilometres (1.2 mi) east
- Long Tanid 4.1 kilometres (2.5 mi) northeast
- Long Semado Nasab 6.7 kilometres (4.2 mi) northeast
- Long Semado 6.7 kilometres (4.2 mi) northeast
- Long Lapukan 7.6 kilometres (4.7 mi) north
- Long Kinoman 10.5 kilometres (6.5 mi) northeast
- Long Lopeng 11.9 kilometres (7.4 mi) northwest
- Punang Terusan 11.9 kilometres (7.4 mi) northeast
- Long Ugong 14.9 kilometres (9.3 mi) southeast
- Budok Aru 18.3 kilometres (11.4 mi) southeast
