= Kampung Pangaleh =

- Location within Borneo
- Coordinates: 4.81667°N 115.45°E
- Country: Malaysia
- State: Sarawak
- Administrative Division: Lawas
- Elevation: 151 m (495 ft)

Kampung Pangaleh is a settlement in the Lawas division of Sarawak, Malaysia. It lies approximately 672.8 kilometres (418 mi) east-north-east of the state capital Kuching.

Neighbouring settlements include:

- Kampung Lawas 5.2 kilometres (3.2 mi) northwest
- Kampung Sitakong 5.2 kilometres (3.2 mi) northwest
- Kampung Gaya 5.8 kilometres (3.6 mi) west
- Long Tuma 5.8 kilometres (3.6 mi) west
- Kampung Surabaya 5.9 kilometres (3.7 mi) north
- Lawas 6.7 kilometres (4.2 mi) northwest
- Long Sabuloh 7.9 kilometres (4.9 mi) southwest
- Kampung Belu 9.3 kilometres (5.8 mi) southwest
- Kampung Puteh 10.8 kilometres (6.7 mi) southeast
- Kampung Melipat 10.8 kilometres (6.7 mi) northwest
