= WBGU =

WBGU may refer to:

- WBGU, the German Advisory Council on Global Change
- WBGU (FM), a radio station (88.1 FM) licensed to Bowling Green, Ohio, United States
- WBGU-TV, a television station (channel 22, virtual 27) licensed to Bowling Green, Ohio, United States
- Long Sukang Airport (ICAO code WBGU)
