= LSU (disambiguation) =

LSU refers to Louisiana State University, a public university in Baton Rouge, Louisiana, United States.

LSU may also refer to:

== Education ==
- La Sainte Union College of Higher Education, teacher training college in Southampton, United Kingdom
- La Salle University (Ozamiz), a Lasallian university in the Philippines
- La Sierra University, a Seventh-day Adventist university in Riverside, California, United States
- Lambda Sigma Upsilon, a Latino collegiate fraternity
- Leyte State University, a public university in Baybay, Leyte, Philippines
- Lithuanian Sports University, a university in Kaunas, Lithuania
- Liverpool Students' Union, the students' union for Liverpool John Moores University, United Kingdom
- Loughborough Students' Union, the students' union for Loughborough, Leicestershire, United Kingdom
- LSU Tigers and Lady Tigers, Louisiana State University's athletic program
- Lupane State University, Zimbabwe

== Other uses ==
- LSU rRNA, large subunit ribosomal ribonucleic acid
- Latin-Script Uyghur, also known as the Uyghur Latin alphabet
- Lifesavers Underground, a Christian rock band
- Link state update, a type of OSPF protocol message
- Livestock Unit, a measure of livestock density
- Long Sukang Airport by IATA code
- Load–store unit, a specialized execution unit of CPUs
