= Awang Bemee Awang Ali Basah =

Malaysian politician and lawyer (born 1959)

Yang Berhormat Senator Dato Sri Awang Bemee Awang Ali Basah PNBS DIMP PSBS PBS
- أواڠ بيمي أواڠ علي باشا
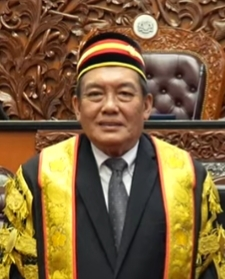

21st President of the Dewan Negara
- Incumbent
- Assumed office 22 July 2024
- Monarch: Ibrahim
- Prime Minister: Anwar Ibrahim
- Deputy: Nur Jazlan Mohamed
- Preceded by: Mutang Tagal

Senator (Appointed by the Yang di-Pertuan Agong)
- Incumbent
- Assumed office 15 July 2024
- Monarch: Ibrahim
- Prime Minister: Anwar Ibrahim

Member of the Sarawak State Legislative Assembly for Nangka
- In office 8 September 1996 – 16 April 2011
- Preceded by: Position established
- Succeeded by: Annuar Rapaee (BN–PBB)
- Majority: Walkover (1996); 7,005 (2001); 4,815 (2006)

Personal details
- Born: Awang Bemee bin Awang Ali Basah; 22 June 1959 (age 67) Sibu, Crown Colony of Sarawak (now Sarawak, Malaysia)
- Citizenship: Malaysia
- Party: Parti Pesaka Bumiputera Bersatu (PBB)
- Other political affiliations: Barisan Nasional (BN) (until 2018); Gabungan Parti Sarawak (GPS) (since 2018)
- Children: Dayang Hazirah
- Education: University of Malaya (LLB)
- Occupation: Politician
- Profession: Lawyer

Awang Bemee bin Awang Ali Basah (born 22 June 1959) is a Malaysian politician and lawyer who has served as the 21st President of the Dewan Negara and Senator since July 2024. He served as Member of the Sarawak State Legislative Assembly (MLA) for Nangka from September 1996 to April 2011. He is a member, Member of the Supreme Council, Legal Advisor and was Youth Secretary-General of the Parti Pesaka Bumiputera Bersatu (PBB), a component party of the Gabungan Parti Sarawak (GPS) and formerly Barisan Nasional (BN) coalition. He is also the Public Officer of GPS. He has been the Chairman of Kuching Port Authority since 1997 and has practised as an advocate and solicitor and legal practitioner since being admitted to the High Court of Borneo, Sarawak in 1984. He is an independent non-executive director of the Sarawak Plantation Berhad (SPB) and a partner in the legal firm Messrs. Awang Lai Sandhu and Co.

== Political career ==
=== Member of the Sarawak State Legislative Assembly (1996–2011) ===
==== 1996 Sarawak state election ====
In the 1996 Sarawak state election, Awang Bemee made his electoral debut after being nominated by BN to contest for the Nangka state seat. He won the seat and was elected to the Sarawak State Legislative Assembly as the Nangka MLA for the first term in a walkover.

==== 2001 Sarawak state election ====
In the 2001 Sarawak state election, Awang Bemee was renominated by BN to defend the Nangka state seat. He defended the seat and was reelected to the Sarawak Assembly as the Nangka MLA for the second term after defeating independent candidate Abang Abdul Haili Abang Naili and Abd Rahman Putit of the National Justice Party (keADILan) by a majority of 7,005 votes.

==== 2006 Sarawak state election ====
In the 2006 Sarawak state election, Awang Bemee was renominated by BN to defend the Nangka state seat. He defended the seat and was reelected to the Sarawak Assembly as the Nangka MLA for the third term after defeating Abang Ariffin Abang Sebli of the People's Justice Party (PKR) by a decreased majority of 4,815 votes.

=== President of the Dewan Negara and Senator (since 2024) ===
On 15 July 2024, Awang Bemee was appointed to the Parliament as a Senator. A week later on 22 July 2024, he was appointed 21st President of the Dewan Negara, replacing Mutang Tagal who died in office more than two months prior on 10 May 2024.

== Election results ==
Sarawak State Legislative Assembly
Year	Constituency	Candidate	Votes	Pct	Opponent(s)	Votes	Pct	Ballots cast	Majority	Turnout
1996	N55 Nangka	Awang Bemee Awang Ali Basah (PBB)	Walkover							
2001	N55 Nangka	Awang Bemee Awang Ali Basah (PBB)	7,559	87.37%	Abang Abdul Halil Abang Naili (IND)	554	6.40%	8,652	7,005	69.18%
2001	N55 Nangka	Awang Bemee Awang Ali Basah (PBB)	7,559	87.37%	Abd Rahman Putit (keADILan)	539	6.23%	8,652	7,005	69.18%
2006	N55 Nangka	Awang Bemee Awang Ali Basah (PBB)	6,202	81.72%	Abang Ariffin Abang Sebli (PKR)	1,387	18.28%	7,589	4,815	60.42%

== Honours ==
- Pahang
  - Knight Companion of the Order of the Crown of Pahang (DIMP) – Dato' (2008)
- Sarawak
  - Knight Commander of the Order of the Star of Sarawak (PNBS) – Dato Sri (2026)
  - Commander of the Most Exalted Order of the Star of Sarawak (PSBS) – Dato (2019)
  - Officer of the Most Exalted Order of the Star of Sarawak (PBS)
  - Silver Medal of the Sarawak Independence Diamond Jubilee Medal (2024)

== See also ==
- Members of the Dewan Negara, 15th Malaysian Parliament
