= Annuar Rapaee =

Malaysian cardiologist and politician

Yang Berhormat Datuk Annuar Rapaee PGBK JBS MLA
- أنوار رباعى
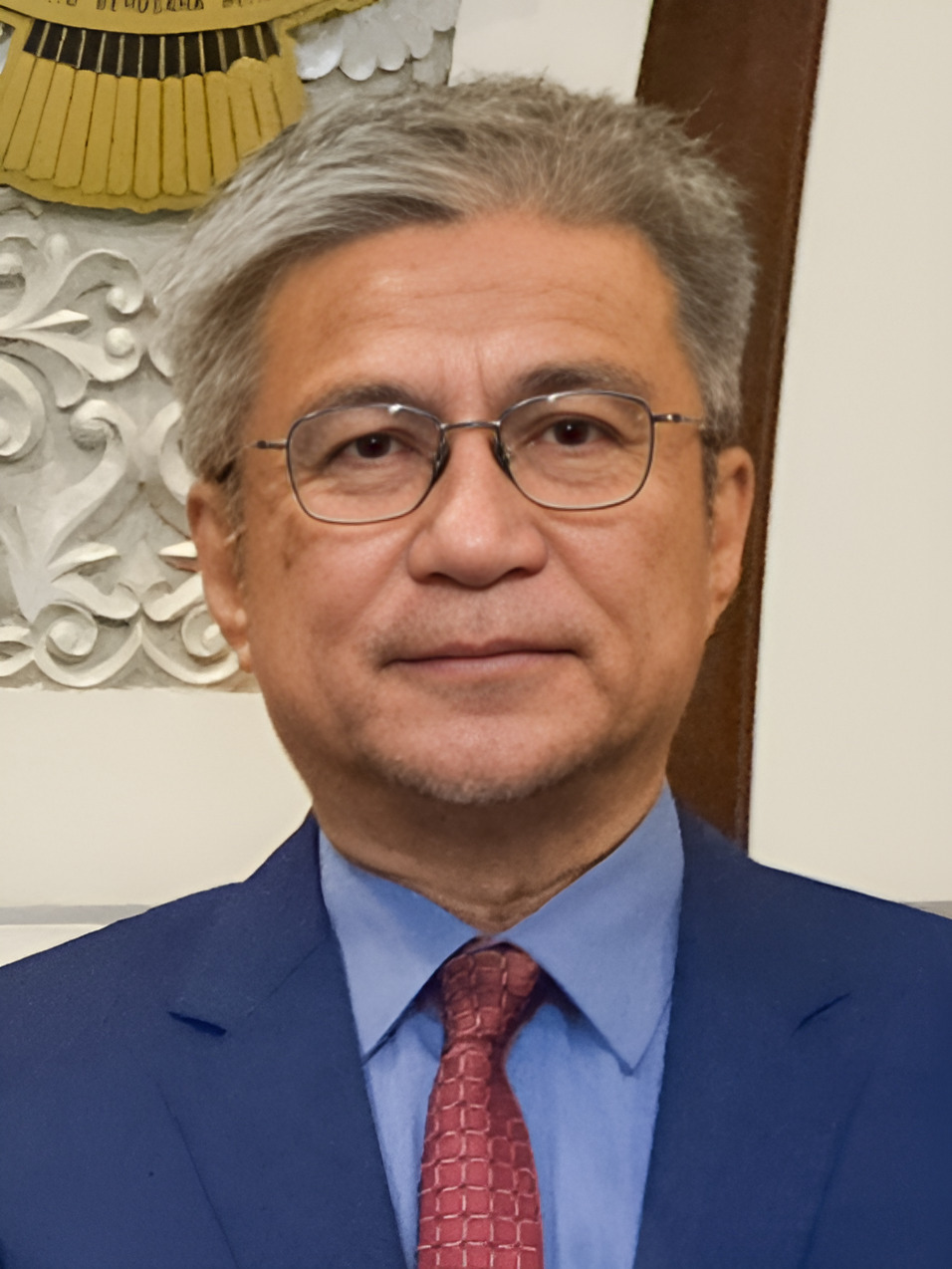
- Annuar in 2025

Vice President of the Parti Pesaka Bumiputera Bersatu
- Incumbent
- Assumed office 10 February 2018 Serving with Julaihi Narawi, Abdul Karim Rahman Hamzah, Abdul Rahman Junaidi, Gerawat Gala, Roland Sagah, Stephen Rundi Utom
- President: Abang Abdul Rahman Zohari Abang Openg

Chairman of the Board of Directors of University of Technology Sarawak
- Incumbent
- Assumed office 30 March 2021
- Chancellor: Abdul Taib Mahmud
- Preceded by: Wong Soon Koh

Ministerial roles (Sarawak)
- 2016–2017: Deputy Minister in the Chief Minister's Department
- 2017–2022: Deputy Minister of Education, Science and Technological Research
- 2017–2022: Deputy Minister of Housing and Public Health
- 2022–: Deputy Minister of Education, Innovation and Talent Development

Faction represented in Sarawak State Legislative Assembly
- 2011–2018: Barisan Nasional
- 2018–: Gabungan Parti Sarawak

Personal details
- Born: Annuar bin Rapaee; 18 November 1963 (age 62) Kampung Datu Lama, Sibu, Sarawak, Malaysia
- Citizenship: Malaysian
- Party: Parti Pesaka Bumiputera Bersatu (PBB)
- Other political affiliations: Barisan Nasional (BN) (2011–2018); Gabungan Parti Sarawak (GPS) (since 2018)
- Spouse: Haniza Zainal Abidin
- Children: 2
- Education: University of Malaya (MBBS); St James's University Hospital (MMed); National University of Malaysia; University of Hertfordshire (LLB)
- Occupation: Politician
- Profession: Cardiologist

Annuar bin Rapaee (Jawi: أنور بن رباعى; born 18 November 1963) is a Malaysian cardiologist and politician who has served as State Deputy Minister of Education, Innovation and Talent Development in the Gabungan Parti Sarawak (GPS) state administration under Premier Abang Abdul Rahman Johari Abang Openg since January 2022, Member of the Sarawak State Legislative Assembly (MLA) for Nangka since April 2011 and Chairman of the Board of Directors of University of Technology Sarawak since March 2021. He is a member and Vice-President of Parti Pesaka Bumiputera Bersatu (PBB), a component party of the ruling GPS coalition. He served as State Deputy Minister of Housing and Public Health, State Deputy Minister of Education, Science and Technological Research and State Deputy Minister in the Chief Minister's Department of Sarawak in the Barisan Nasional (BN) and GPS state administrations under Premiers Adenan Satem and Abang Johari from May 2016 to December 2021.

== Early life and education ==
Annuar started his primary education at Sekolah Kebangsaan Bandaran Sibu No.3 from 1970 to 1975, later continuing his secondary education at Sekolah Menengah Kebangsaan Rosli Dhoby from 1976 to 1981. After completing his secondary education, he pursued his pre-university studies at the University of Malaya (UM) from 1981 to 1983 in matriculation at its Centre for Foundation Studies.

Annuar later undertook his tertiary studies at UM until 1988, when he received his Bachelor of Medicine, Bachelor of Surgery (MBBS). He later pursued his postgraduate education at St James's University Hospital, Leeds in United Kingdom for Master of Medicine (MMed) in Internal Medicine. After completing his studies in the UK, he returned to Malaysia to continue his medical practice, and pursued his second postgraduate studies in Advance Master in Cardiology at National University of Malaysia (UKM), from 1998 to 2001.

Later in 2004, Annuar went to Germany to undergo Subspeciality Advance Training at the renowned Deutsches Herzzentrum Berlin. He is an expert in the field of cardiac MRI imaging and has trained other cardiologists during his stints in University of Malaysia, Sarawak (UNIMAS) and at Serdang Hospital in Selangor, Malaysia.

In 2022, Annuar furthered his studies to the law level. He is currently pursuing a three-year law degree from the University of Hertfordshire in United Kingdom through online learning offered through Brickfields Asia College (BAC).

== Political career ==
Annuar's political career began when he was nominated as the candidate for the N49 Nangka, as the incumbent Awang Bemee Awang Ali Basah did not wish to be re-nominated for the 2011 Sarawak state election. He was elected as the new Member of State Legislative Assembly (MLA) with a majority of 5,302 votes over the candidate from People's Justice Party (PKR), Norisham Mohamed Ali, an engineer in the oil and gas industry.

In the 2016 Sarawak state election, Annuar was re-elected for Nangka, with bigger majority of 7,617 votes, beating the PKR candidate Abdul Raafidin Majidi and State Reform Party (STAR) candidate Tiong Ing Tung.

Annuar took the oath of office as Deputy Minister at Chief Minister's Department on 19 May 2016, in a ceremony held at the Sarawak State Legislative Assembly Building, with the portfolio of Science Research and Biotechnology. On 7 May 2017, after the conclusion of PBB Special Assembly, he was announced as the Deputy Minister in the newly created Ministry of Education, Science and Technological Research (MESTR) and also Deputy Minister for Housing and Public Health.

== Personal life ==
Annuar is married to Haniza Zainal Abidin and the couple has two children.

== Election results ==
Sarawak State Legislative Assembly
Year	Constituency	Candidate	Votes	Pct	Opponent(s)	Votes	Pct	Ballots cast	Majority	Turnout
2011	N55 Nangka	Annuar Rapaee (PBB)	7,710	76.20%	Norisham Mohamed Ali (PKR)	2,408	23.80%	10,270	5,302	72.34%
2016	N55 Nangka	Annuar Rapaee (PBB)	9,617	77.62%	Abdul Raafidin Majidi (PKR)	2,000	16.14%	12,613	7,617	67.79%
2016	N55 Nangka	Annuar Rapaee (PBB)	9,617	77.62%	Tiong Ing Tung (STAR)	773	6.24%	12,613	7,617	67.79%
2021	N55 Nangka	Annuar Rapaee (PBB)	12,059	84.09%	Intanurazean Wan Sapuan Daud (PSB)	1,255	8.75%	14,555	10,804	63.03%
2021	N55 Nangka	Annuar Rapaee (PBB)	12,059	84.09%	Olivia Lim Wen Sia (PBK)	1,027	7.16%	14,555	10,804	63.03%

== Honours ==
- Sarawak
  - Commander of the Order of the Star of Hornbill Sarawak (PGBK) – Datuk (2022)
  - Companion of the Most Exalted Order of the Star of Sarawak (JBS) (2020)
