= Nangka (state constituency) =

Nangka (N55)
Sarawak constituency

State constituency
- Legislature: Sarawak State Legislative Assembly
MLA
Vacant
- Constituency created: 1996
- First contested: 1996
- Last contested: 2026

Nangka is a state constituency in Sarawak, Malaysia, that has been represented in the Sarawak State Legislative Assembly since 1996.

The state constituency was created in the 1996 redistribution and is mandated to return a single member to the Sarawak State Legislative Assembly under the first past the post voting system.

== Demographics ==
Ethnic breakdown of Nangka's electorate as of 2022
1. Malay-Muslim bumiputera (45.6%)
2. Chinese (27.9%)
3. Sarawak bumiputera (24.9%)
4. Other ethnicities (1.60%)

== History ==
As of 2020, Nangka has a population of 72,954 people.

=== Polling districts ===
According to the gazette issued on 31 October 2022, the Nangka constituency has a total of 8 polling districts.

State constituency	Polling Districts	Code	Location
Nangka (N55)	Bandong	212/55/01	SK Pendidikan Khas Sibu
Nangka (N55)	Bahagia Jaya	212/55/02	SK Bahagia Jaya
Nangka (N55)	Datu Nyabor	212/55/03	SJK (C) Methodist Jln. Pulau
Nangka (N55)	Ilir Nangka	212/55/04	SK Perbandaran Sibu No.3
Nangka (N55)	Teku	212/55/05	SJK (C) Kiang Hin Teku; SJK (C) Guong Ming; SRA Sibu
Nangka (N55)	Seduan	212/55/06	SJK (C) Thian Chin; SK Ulu Sg. Merah; SJK (C) Nang Sang; SJK (C) Dung Sang; SMK Jalan Oya
Nangka (N55)	Tanggi	212/55/07	Agriculture Farmer Training Centre Batu 20 ¾ Jln. Oya
Nangka (N55)	Race Course	212/55/08	SK St. Mary

=== Representation history ===
Members of the Legislative Assembly for Nangka
Assembly	No	Years	Member	Party
Constituency created, split from Seduan and Dudong
14th	N43	1996–2001	Awang Bemee Awang Ali Basah	BN (PBB)
15th	N43	2001-2006	Awang Bemee Awang Ali Basah	BN (PBB)
16th	N49	2006–2011	Awang Bemee Awang Ali Basah	BN (PBB)
17th	N49	2011–2016	Annuar Rapaee	BN (PBB)
18th	N55	2016–2018	Annuar Rapaee	BN (PBB)
18th	N55	2018–2021	Annuar Rapaee	GPS (PBB)
19th	N55	2021–2026	Annuar Rapaee	GPS (PBB)

== Election results ==
Sarawak state election, 2026
Party	Candidate	Votes	%	∆%
GPS				▲
PH				▲
Total valid votes				
Total rejected ballots				
Unreturned ballots				
Turnout				
Registered electors				
Majority				

Sarawak state election, 2021
Party	Candidate	Votes	%	∆%
GPS	Annuar Rapaee	12,059	84.09	▲84.09
PSB	Intanurazean Wan Sapuan Daud	1,255	8.75	▲8.75
PBK	Olivia Lim Wen Sia	1,027	7.16	▲7.16
Total valid votes		14,341	100.00	
Total rejected ballots		158		
Unreturned ballots		56		
Turnout		14,555	63.03	▼4.76
Registered electors		23,092		
Majority		10,804	75.34	▲13.93
GPS gain from BN		Swing		?
Source(s) https://lom.agc.gov.my/ilims/upload/portal/akta/outputp/1718688/PUB687.pdf

Sarawak state election, 2016
Party	Candidate	Votes	%	∆%
BN	Annuar Rapaee	9,617	77.62	▲1.42
PKR	Abdul Raafidin Majidi	2,000	16.14	▼7.66
STAR	Tiong Ing Tung	773	6.24	▲6.24
Total valid votes		12,390	100.00	
Total rejected ballots		186		
Unreturned ballots		37		
Turnout		12,613	67.79	▼4.55
Registered electors		18,605		
Majority		7,617	61.48	▲9.11
BN hold		Swing		
Source(s) "Federal Government Gazette - Notice of Contested Election, State Legislative Assembly of the State of Sarawak [P.U. (B) 190/2016]" (PDF). Attorney General's Chambers of Malaysia. 25 April 2016. Archived from the original (PDF) on 12 June 2017. "Senarai Calon yang Disahkan Layak Bertanding Pilihan Raya Dewan Undangan Negeri ke-11". Election Commission of Malaysia. 25 April 2016. Archived from the original on 25 April 2016.

Sarawak state election, 2011
Party	Candidate	Votes	%	∆%
BN	Annuar Rapaee	7,710	76.20	▼5.52
PKR	Norisham Mohamed Ali	2,408	23.80	▲5.52
Total valid votes		10,118	100.00	
Total rejected ballots		152		
Unreturned ballots		0		
Turnout		10,270	72.34	▲11.92
Registered electors		14,197		
Majority		5,302	52.40	▼11.09
BN hold		Swing		
Source(s) "Federal Government Gazette - Results of Contested Election and Statements of the Poll after the Official Addition of Votes Sarawak [P.U. (B) 245/2011]" (PDF). Attorney General's Chambers of Malaysia. 29 April 2011.

Sarawak state election, 2006
Party	Candidate	Votes	%	∆%
BN	Awang Bemee Awang Ali Basah	6,202	81.72	▼5.65
PKR	Abang Bungsu @ Abg Ariffin Abg Sebli	1,387	18.28	▲12.05
Total valid votes		7,589	100.00	
Total rejected ballots		182		
Unreturned ballots		68		
Turnout		7,839	60.42	▼8.76
Registered electors		12,973		
Majority		4,815	63.45	▼18.00
BN hold		Swing		

Sarawak state election, 2001
Party	Candidate	Votes	%	∆%
BN	Awang Bemee Awang Ali Basah	7,559	87.37	▲87.37
Independent	Abang Abdul Haili Abang Naili	554	6.40	▲6.40
PKR	Abd Rahman Putit	539	6.23	▲6.23
Total valid votes		8,652	100.00	
Total rejected ballots		158		
Unreturned ballots		63		
Turnout		8,873	69.18	▲69.18
Registered electors		12,826		
Majority		7,005	80.95	▲80.95
BN hold		Swing		

Sarawak state election, 1996
Party	Candidate	Votes	%
On nomination day, Awang Bemee Awang Ali Basah won uncontested.
BN	Awang Bemee Awang Ali Basah		
Total valid votes			
Total rejected ballots			
Unreturned ballots			
Turnout			
Registered electors		13,827	
Majority			
This was a new constituency created.
