= Long Sabuloh =

- Location within Borneo
- Coordinates: 4.76667°N 115.4°E
- Country: Malaysia
- State: Sarawak
- Administrative Division: Lawas
- Elevation: 97 m (318 ft)

Long Sabuloh is a settlement in the Lawas division of Sarawak, Malaysia. It lies approximately 665.1 kilometres (413 mi) east-north-east of the state capital Kuching.

Neighbouring settlements include:

- Kampung Belu 1.9 kilometres (1.2 mi) south
- Long Tuma 3.7 kilometres (2.3 mi) north
- Kampung Gaya 7.4 kilometres (4.6 mi) north
- Kampung Pangaleh 7.9 kilometres (4.9 mi) northeast
- Lawas 9.3 kilometres (5.8 mi) north
- Kampung Sitakong 9.5 kilometres (5.9 mi) north
- Kampung Lawas 9.5 kilometres (5.9 mi) north
- Long Tuan 10.8 kilometres (6.7 mi) southwest
- Long Tukan 11.7 kilometres (7.3 mi) west
- Kampung Surabaya 11.7 kilometres (7.3 mi) north
