= Centre for Foundation Studies, University of Malaya =

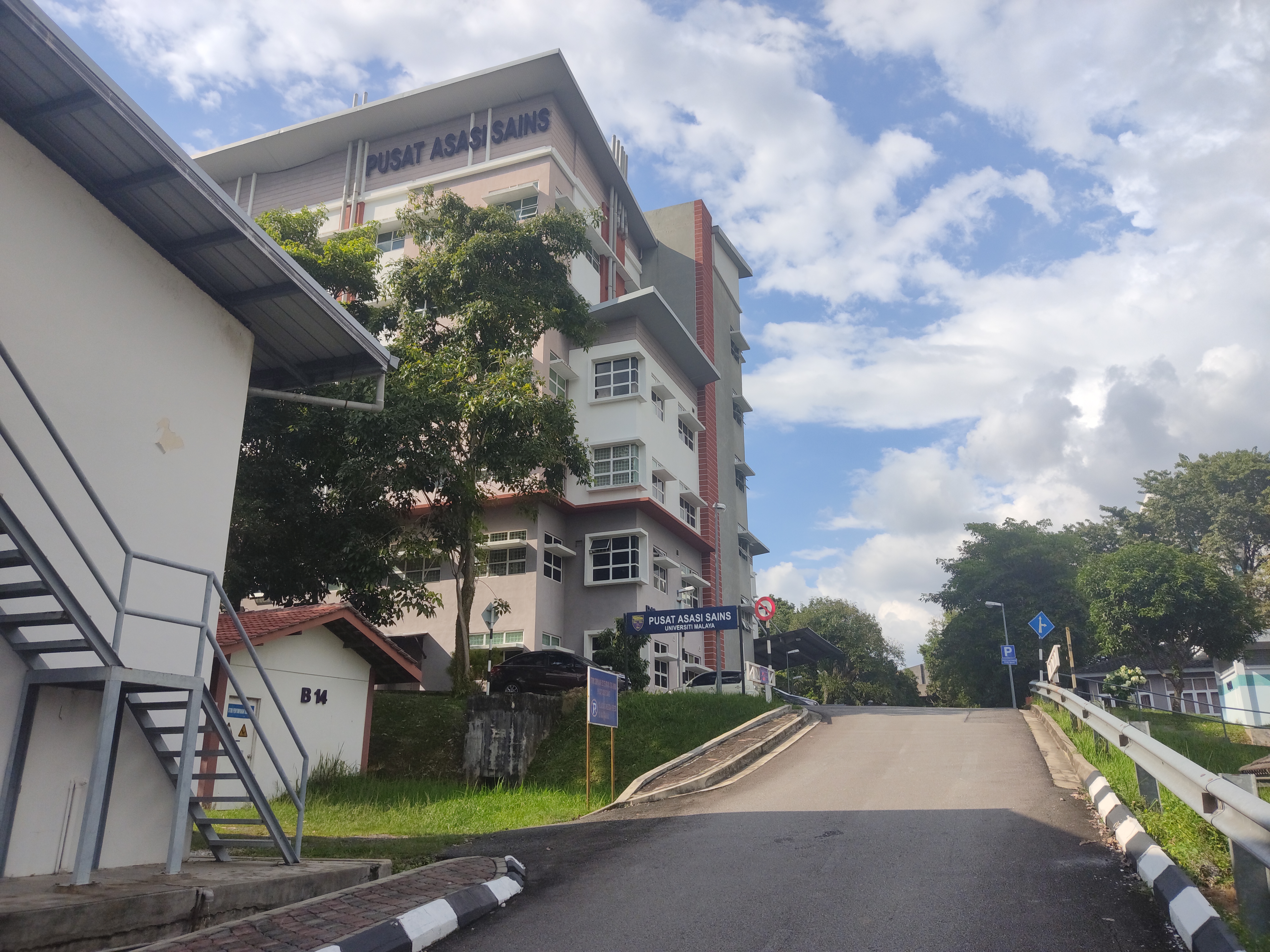
Centre for Foundation Studies, University of Malaya

Centre for Foundation Studies, University of Malaya was established in 1977 under the provisions of Section 18 of the Constitution of the University of Malaya, which is a program of study Pre-University or Matriculation.

== History ==
The center was an idea of Ungku Aziz. Student academic session 1977/78 is the first group of students from the program have been able to continue their studies to the Faculty of Dentistry, Faculty of Engineering and Faculty of Science. They have received a bachelor's degree in Universiti Malaya convocation in 1983 The University convocation in 1984 saw the first batch of this program who successfully received a degree in medicine. In the 1982/1983 session, Center for Science Foundation in collaboration with the Department of Public Service and the Japanese government has arranged a special program, the Special Preparatory Programme (Japan) in response to the government to implement the Look East Policy. Students who do well will continue their studies at Japanese universities in the fields of Science, Engineering Management, Medical, Dental, and Business. Start 1988/1989 session, two new courses have been implemented at the Center for Science Foundation, the Pre-Accounting program dedicated to providing students native to the Faculty of Economics and Administration in Accounting and Business Administration. Meanwhile, Pre Program English as a Second Language prepares students to take to the Faculty of Education Bachelor of Education (Teaching English as a Second Language). 1997/1998 session, Central Science Foundation has reviewed the structure of study to fit in line with current changes. Under the new system, students Science Foundation Center with excellent results can complete the course of study within two semesters. However, students who can not afford the opportunity to complete the course within a period of 3 or 4 semesters. Among the programs involved are Flow of Life Sciences, Physical Sciences Trends, English as a Second Language Pre and Pre Accounting. Special Preparatory Programme (Japan) remained in the study long structure. Pre-Accounting program has been restructured to allow students to consider admission to courses in Business Administration and Economics. Therefore, the program has been renamed Accounting Pre to Pre Program Accounting / Business / Economics (Pre PPE). In this session program Pre-Law and Pre-Built Environment has also been introduced.

Science Foundation Center has a program in collaboration with nine private institutions in the 1998/99 session. Among the colleges that run the program this collaboration is MARA College Banting Institute Maxisegar, IKIP, Cempaka College, Kolej Uniti, Goon Institute, INPENS, Matriculation College Education Foundation MARA Terengganu and Kuantan. 1999/2000 session, almost all of the students were placed in the campus and placed in a small part of MARA College Banting. Program conducted at that time was Science Foundation Program (Life Science and stream flow Physical Sciences), Pre Program Accounting / Business / Economy and Preparedness Plan Special (Japan). 2000/2001 session, only the Special Preparatory Programme (Japan) has a new student and the Program Science Foundation manages a number of students who have completed their studies in semester 3 or 4. In the 2001/2002 academic session, the intake made Foundation Programme for Life Sciences and Physical Science Foundation and the Special Preparatory Programme (Japan). These students have been placed in the Fifth Residential College for students Preparedness Plan Special (Japan) and the Residential College for students Eleventh Science Foundation. For 2002/2003 intake, a total of 1,100 candidates have been successfully placed in the Science Foundation Center for Life Science Foundation Program and Physical Science Foundation. These students as well as students Preparedness Plan Special (Japan), about 160 people stationed at the Eleventh College to facilitate the monitoring process. A total of about 900 students have been placed at the Center for Science Foundation Science Foundation Programme for 2003/2004 admission. Students Science Foundation Program and Special Japanese students Preparedness Plan (RPKJ) of 180 people located in the same residential college.

2004/2005 from the academic session, the teaching is conducted in English for all lectures, tutorials and practicals for Science Foundation Programme. Science Foundation Center emphasis in English courses so that students gain the necessary exposure to facilitate the learning process effectively. For this session, Fundamental Science Center received at about 1000 students for Science Foundation program and still maintaining the intake of students for the Special Preparatory Program Plan Japan about 180 students. Each student center housed in the College of Human Sciences Eleventh House. For 2005/2006 intake, Science Foundation Center has received nearly 1250 students to program and Science Foundation of 160 students for the Special Preparatory Program Plan Japan (RPKJ). In this session, handling lectures / tutorials / practicals in l for the Special Preparatory Program Plan Japan (RPKJ) is in English. Science Foundation Program students remain stayed Sin Aziz Residential College (College Eleventh) while students Preparedness Plan Special Japan (RPKJ) placed in the Residential College Dr. Raja Nazrin Shah. From the academic session 2006/2007, Science Foundation program has been absorbed under matriculation programs or Pre Degree Program under the IPT Management Department, Ministry of Higher Education Malaysia. Therefore, the recruitment of students is through the Student Entry Management Division (BPKP), Ministry of Higher Education Malaysia. For this session, a total of 1,100 students have been accepted into the Science Foundation Center for Basic Science Program. As for the Special Preparatory Program Plan Japan (RPKJ), the number of students admitted remained about 160 students.

2007/2008 session, it will be exactly 30 years of age Establishment Science Foundation Center. In this session, Foundation Center has offered the Built Environment Foundation Programme with a total enrolment of 100. Students who complete this program will continue their studies in the Faculty of Built Environment, University of Malaya in the field of Architecture, Quantity Surveying, Building Surveying and Property Management. From this session students will be staying Science Foundation Center at King College Dr. Nazrin Shah. 2008/2009 session, Science Foundation Center has a total of 745 students registered for the program Science Foundation (Flow of Life Sciences and Physical Science Stream). While a total of 75 students are from the Foundation Programme of the Built Environment. Science Foundation Center has created history in the 2009/2010 session with most of the increase in students 1400 students in the Flow of Life Sciences and Physical Sciences. The Foundation for the Built Environment Programme, a total of 120 students have been successfully placed in the Central Science Foundation. 2010/2011 session, a total of 1,600 people were admitted to the Science Foundation Center for Life Science Foundation Programme and Physical Science Foundation Programme. While a total of 110 students were admitted to Foundation Programme of the Built Environment. Science Foundation Center has received a total of 1,500 students for the Foundation Programme Life Science and Physical Science Foundation Programme in 2011/2012 session. While 100 students have been accepted into the Foundation Programme of the Built Environment. Special Preparatory Program Plan (Japan), a total of 101 students were enrolled in the session. 2012/2013 session, Science Foundation Center maintains a level of intake as the previous year. The Foundation Programme students staying at King College Dr. Nazrin Shah while RPKJ program all students stay in Sin Aziz Residential College. 2013/2014 session, the first time the University of Malaya perform exercises interviews for all programs offered including Foundation Programme at the Centre for Science Foundation. In this session Science Foundation Center maintains 1000 intake of students for each program and the Life Science Foundation Physical Science Foundation Programme. While 100 students were offered a Foundation Built Environment Program.

== See also ==
- University of Malaya
