= University of Technology Sarawak =

Private university in Sibu, Sarawak

- Universiti Teknologi Sarawak (Malay)
- Former name: University College of Technology Sarawak
- Type: Under State-Owned Institute, Half-Private University
- Established: 2013; 13 years ago
- Founder: State of Sarawak (by Abdul Taib Mahmud)
- Accreditation: MOHE
- Academic affiliations: MOE; MQA; MBOT; EAC; BAM; ACCA; CPAAus; PAQS
- Chairman: Annuar Rapaee
- Chancellor: Wan Junaidi Tuanku Jaafar
- Vice-Chancellor: Mohammad Shahril Osman
- Pro-Chancellor: Abang Abdul Rahman Zohari Abang Openg
- Academic staff: 210 (September 2024)
- Total staff: 335 (2023)
- Students: 5,003 (September 2025)
- Location: Sibu, Sarawak, Malaysia; 2°20′28″N 111°50′36″E
- Campus: 96.98 acres (39.25 ha); Urban
- Colors: Navy, black, gainsboro, and white
- Mascot: Adam
- Website: uts.edu.my

The University of Technology Sarawak (UTS) is a Malaysian private university and state government-linked university as it is wholly owned by Yayasan Sarawak located in Sibu, Sarawak.

It operates at two campuses as of now: main campus at Sungai Merah, Sibu and Laila Taib Campus at Mukah. Additionally, the university also has a marketing centre at Kuching.

== History ==
The university was established on 1 April 2013 as "University College of Technology Sarawak" (UCTS). It is the first university in Sarawak owned by the state government. The university is considered as one of the newest and latest university in Malaysia and recognised as the only TVET university in Sarawak with the aim of producing highly educated and skilled professionals for new and rapidly developing industries. UTS held its inaugural convocation on 8 October 2016 with 100 graduates. During the occasion, UTS announced its first chancellor, the Governor of Sarawak, Tun Pehin Sri Abdul Taib Mahmud.

=== 2021 to present ===
In January 2021, the university become wholly owned by Yayasan Sarawak, the statutory body under the government of Sarawak. In May 2021, UTS was named as one of the seven most beautiful campuses in Malaysia by a high society magazine, Tatler Malaysia.

The university college was then upgraded into a full-fledged university as "University of Technology Sarawak" on 10 November 2021 by the Malaysian Ministry of Higher Education. Sarawak's Premier, Abang Abdul Rahman Zohari Abang Openg was appointed as the first Pro-Chancellor after the university received its full-fledged university status.

On 12 June 2024, Head of State Tun Pehin Sri Dr Wan Junaidi Tuanku Jaafar has been appointed as the second chancellor replacing the previous chancellor, Tun Pehin Sri Abdul Taib Mahmud.

== Organisation ==
As of 2018, UTS had 140 academic staff and 120 support personnel. Out of 140 academic staff, 30% of them were PhD holders. A total of 1,800 students were enrolled. A total of 300 graduates were produced in 2016 and 2017.

As of 2023, the university consists of six schools, namely;

- School of Foundation Studies
- School of Engineering and Technology
- School of Business and Management
- School of Built Environment
- School of Computing and Creative Media
- School of Postgraduate Studies

== Admission and education ==
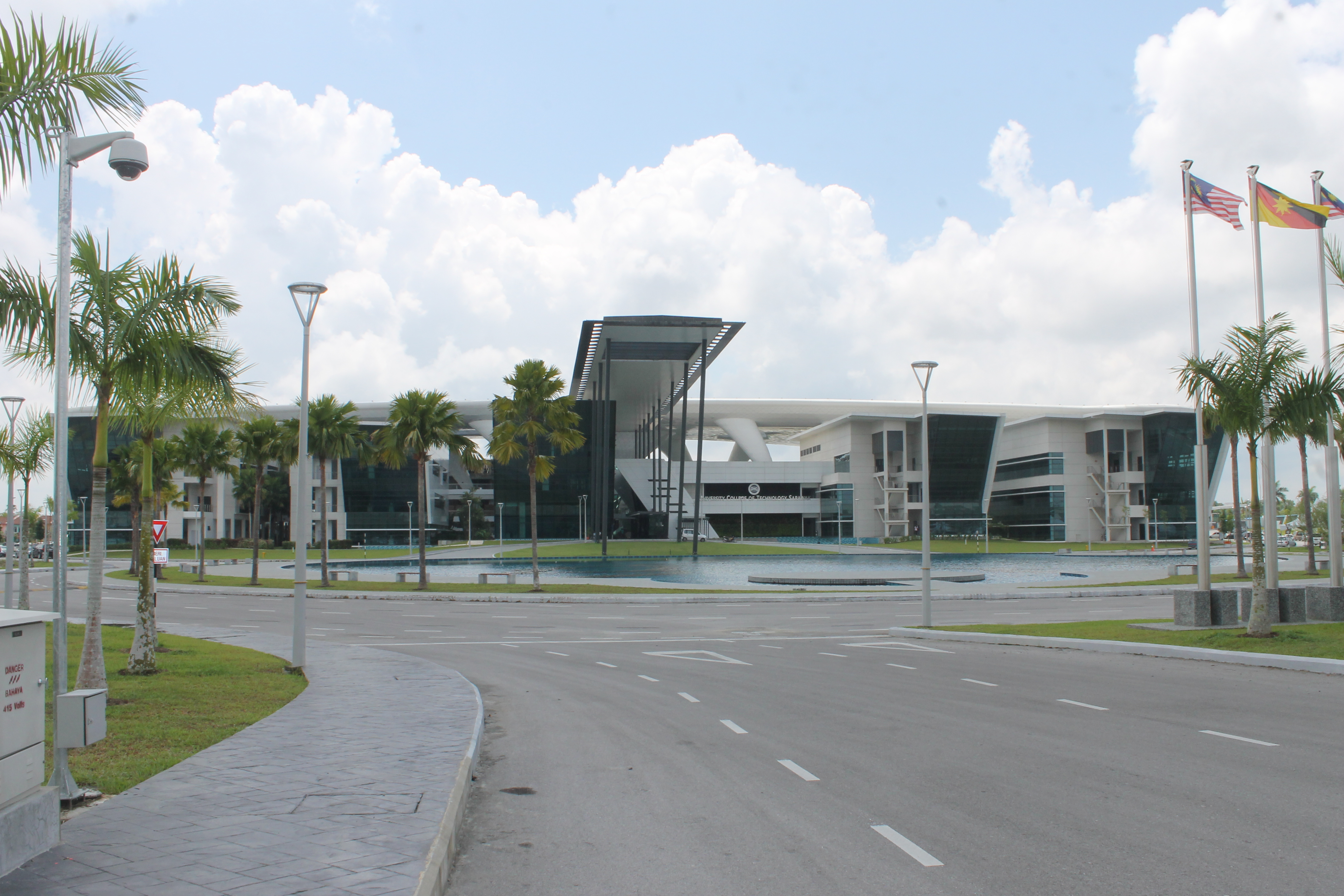
Main building

For Sarawakian students, UTS is not selective in its admission procedures. All Sarawakians students are given full scholarships to enrol in UTS one-year Foundation course, and those who pursue their undergraduate studies therein are offered 50% scholarships of the cost of their tuition. Students will also receive the 50% scholarship if they wish to pursue their studies for a Master's or PhD. In 2023, UTS offer 34 programmes from Foundation, Bachelor’s, Master’s to a PhD degree.

The main language of instruction in the university is English, and proof of sufficient knowledge of the English language is required for undergraduate students to be admitted.

As at most private universities in Malaysia, the academic year is divided into three semesters where the long semester will be held on February and September. Meanwhile, the short semester will be held on July every year for 2 months period. For internship programme, all UTS programmes include 3 to 6 months of industrial training.

Since 2018, UTS runs a Degree Transfer Programme with five leading foreign universities, namely Murdoch University in Australia; University of Essex, University of Birmingham, and University of Portsmouth in England; and the University of Canterbury in New Zealand.

== Campus and architecture ==
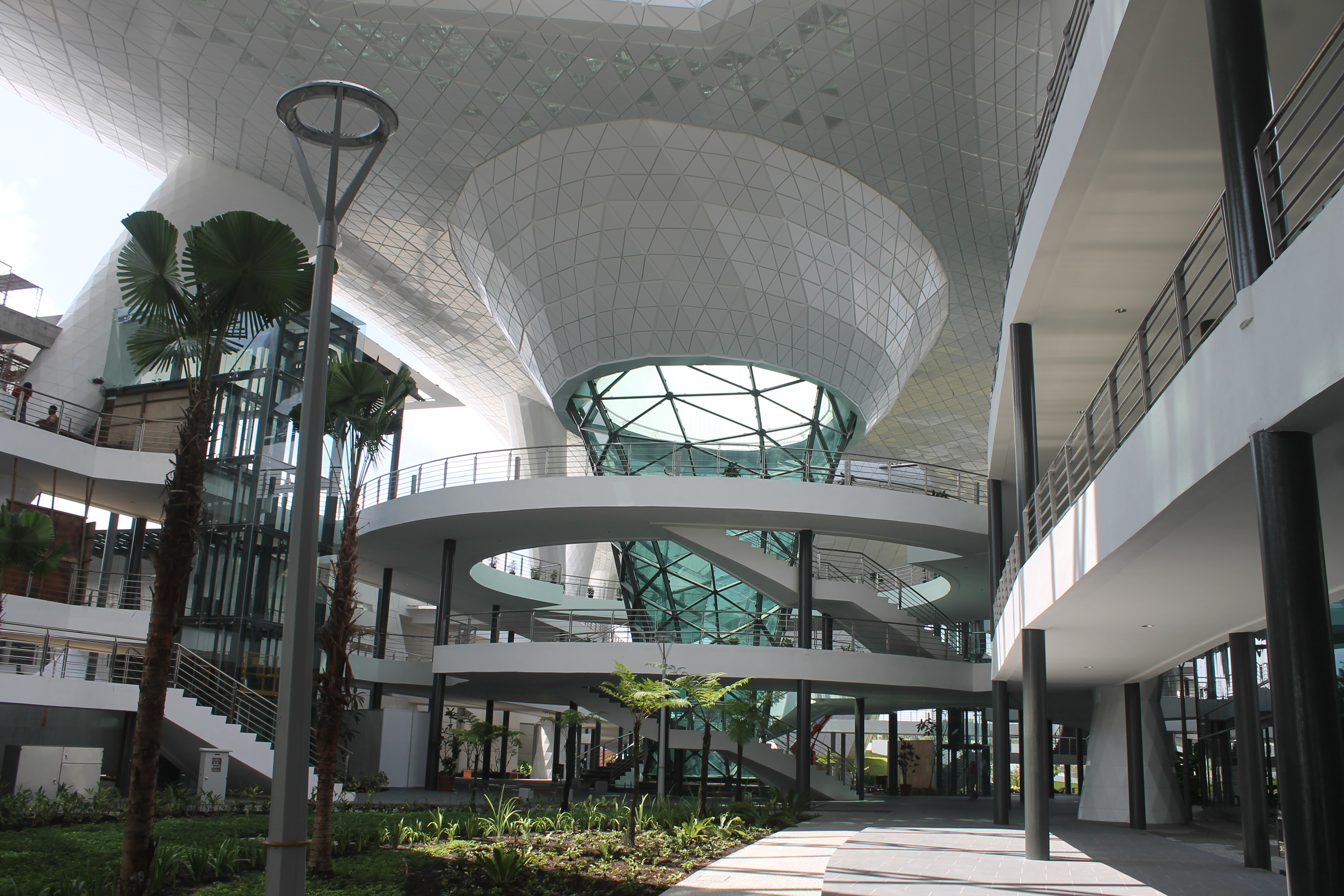
Interior of University of Technology Sarawak

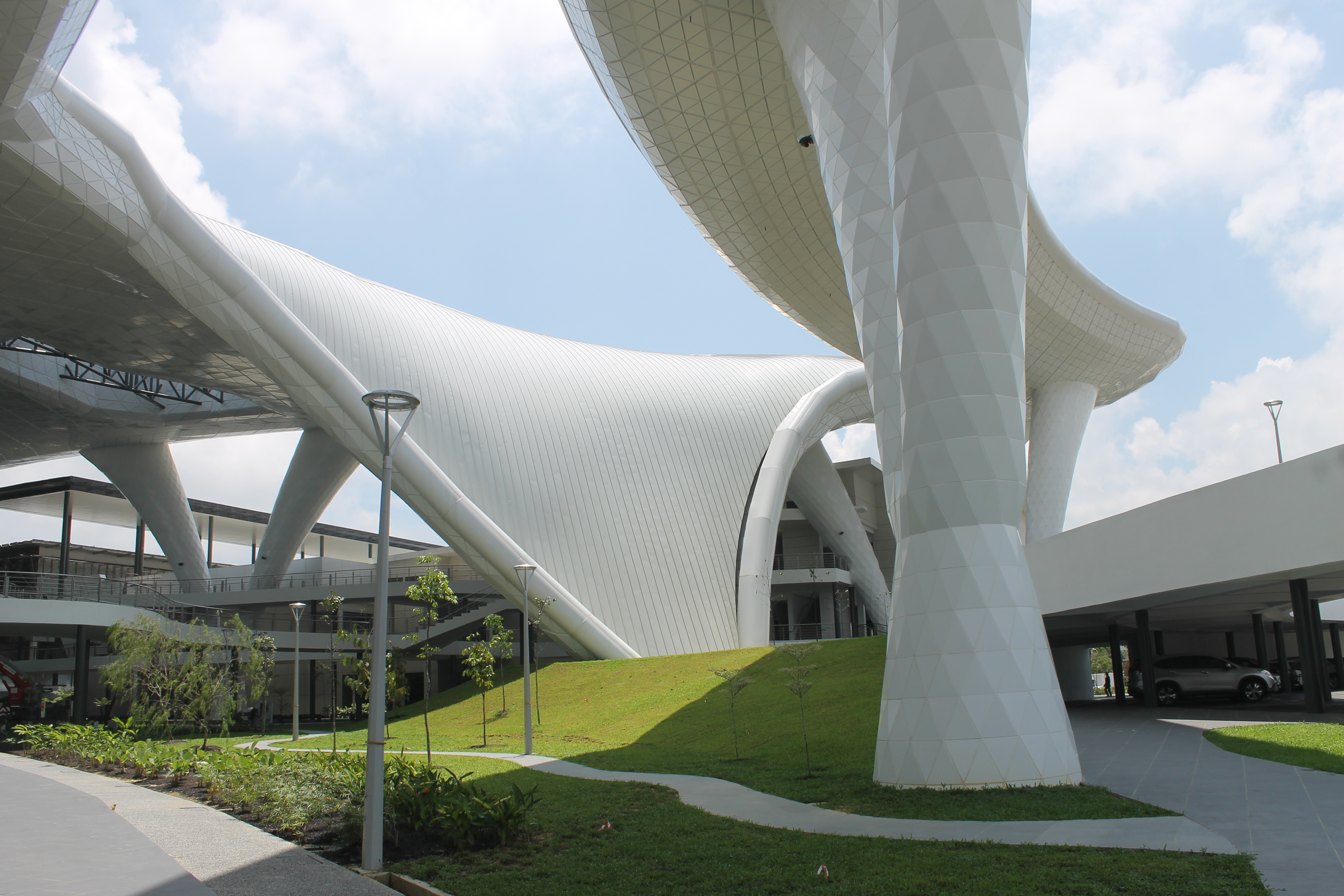
Exterior of University of Technology Sarawak

Phase One of the completion project of the university was constructed by Hock Peng Organisation with Naim Engineering as joint venture partner.

In 2015, the university became the first university in the world to receive platinum award for Green Building Index (GBI). The university building uses 50% less energy comparing to a typical building, using technologies such as LED bulbs with motion sensors, harvesting rainwater for ponds, air-conditioning, flushing toilets, and gardening. The modern atmosphere surrounded by rainforest and nature will provide the most conducive learning environment for students.

In September 2016, Hock Peng Organisation completed its construction of "Unicity", a commercial area that contains hostels to cater the needs of the university students, a hotel, department store, supermarket, and 80 units of shophouses.

=== Mukah Campus ===
The UTS Mukah campus named "University of Technology Sarawak Laila Taib Campus" began its construction before 2020 and will to cater for the production of skilled workers especially in the maritime industry. The campus was completed in 2024 and will offer two degree programmes, namely:

- Bachelor of Marine Engineering Technology (Hons)
- Bachelor of Nautical Studies (Hons)

and other professional programmes that lead to certification in a variety of marine professions.

== Research centres ==
UTS set up six research centres as of 2021. Borneo Regionalism and Conservation (BORC) is created to conserve heritage buildings, structures, monuments, and socio-cultural documentation in Sarawak and Borneo.

In November 2017, Centre of Excellence in Wood Engineered Products (CeWEP) was set up to focus on R&D on engineered wood.

In 2019, UTS created the Centre On Technological Readiness And Innovation In Business Technopreneurship (Contribute) to develop the digital economy of Sarawak and encourage entrepreneurship with the help of technology. UTS also set up the Centre for Research of Innovation & Sustainable Development (CRISD) focusing on research into the fields of energy, bio resources, environment, and materials. Laboratories have been set up to conduct researches into these areas. As of 2019, the university has published more than 354 journals and books.

In 2020, UTS introduced three research centres namely Advanced Centre for Sustainable Socio-economic and Technological Development (ASSET) for research and development (R&D) activities in rural areas of Sarawak. ASSET has designated several rural areas in Sarawak as learning centres, namely Bawang Assan and Machan villages in central Sarawak and Long Lamai, Long Leng, Long Kerangan, Long Urang, Long Win, Long Jenalang, and Long Latei villages in northern Sarawak. Another research centre is Collaborative Research Laboratory on Advanced Cybersecurity Knowledge (CRACK) to conduct R&D activities on cybersecurity in Sarawak. Another research centre is Drone Research And Application Center to spearhead the training, application, and research into drone technologies.

In March 2022, UTS set up a special research chair for medical technology with RM 2 million grant from the government of Sarawak named "Datuk Patinggi Dr Wong Soon Kai Chair on Medical Devices Technology and Innovation".

== Student life ==
Since 2021, the university offers UTS Foundation Scholarship where it covers RM 10,000 of tuition fees for each successful applicant. UTS Undergraduate and Postgraduate Scholarships will bear 50% off of tuition fees for those pursuing undergraduate and postgraduate studies.

UTS Bursary Scheme was also launched to cover 80% of the tuition fees for B40 (household income between RM 3,000 to RM 6,275) and M40 (household income between RM6,276 - RM13,148) groups who wished to study at UTS, limiting to 100 bumiputera and 100 non-bumiputera students.

=== Student Council ===
The UTS Student Council serves as the official student representative body at the University of Technology Sarawak (UTS), Malaysia. It functions as the highest student-led legislative authority within the university. Elections are conducted annually to choose members who will represent the student community in the council.

== See also ==
- List of universities in Malaysia
