= Long Semado =

- Location within Borneo
- Coordinates: 4.25°N 115.58333°E
- Country: Malaysia
- State: Sarawak
- Administrative Division: Lawas
- Elevation: 939 m (3,081 ft)

Long Semado (also known as Semado, Long Semadoh or Long Semabo) is a settlement in the Lawas division of Sarawak, Malaysia. It lies approximately 654.6 kilometres (407 mi) east-north-east of the state capital Kuching.

Neighbouring settlements include:

- Long Semado Nasab 2.6 kilometres (1.6 mi) southeast
- Long Tanid 3.7 kilometres (2.3 mi) south
- Long Kinoman 4.1 kilometres (2.5 mi) northeast
- Punang Terusan 5.2 kilometres (3.2 mi) northeast
- Long Lapukan 5.9 kilometres (3.7 mi) west
- Long Beluyu 5.9 kilometres (3.7 mi) south
- Long Karabangan 6.7 kilometres (4.2 mi) southwest
- Long Lopeng 11.7 kilometres (7.3 mi) west
- Long Merarap 17.1 kilometres (10.6 mi) northwest
- Long Ugong 18.9 kilometres (11.7 mi) south
