= Kampung Gaya =

- Location within Borneo
- Coordinates: 4.83333°N 115.4°E
- Country: Malaysia
- State: Sarawak
- Administrative Division: Lawas
- Elevation: 100 m (330 ft)

Kampung Gaya is a settlement in the Lawas division of Sarawak, Malaysia. It lies approximately 669.1 kilometres (416 mi) east-north-east of the state capital Kuching.

Neighbouring settlements include:

- Lawas 1.9 kilometres (1.2 mi) north
- Kampung Lawas 2.6 kilometres (1.6 mi) northeast
- Kampung Sitakong 2.6 kilometres (1.6 mi) northeast
- Long Tuma 3.7 kilometres (2.3 mi) south
- Kampung Surabaya 5.2 kilometres (3.2 mi) northeast
- Kampung Pangaleh 5.8 kilometres (3.6 mi) east
- Long Sabuloh 7.4 kilometres (4.6 mi) south
- Kampung Melipat 7.4 kilometres (4.6 mi) north
- Kampung Sulai 7.9 kilometres (4.9 mi) northwest
- Punang 9.3 kilometres (5.8 mi) northwest
