= Kolej MARA Banting =

College in Sepang, Selangor, Malaysia

MARA College Banting
- Kolej MARA Banting

Location
- Bukit Changgang; Sepang, Selangor 42700; Malaysia
- Coordinates: 2.820437°N 101.622156°E

Information
- School type: State Public boarding school
- Motto: Berdisiplin, Beramal, Berilmu
- Established: 1990
- Director: Arfaseela Amiruddin
- Teaching staff: Mathematics department - 14 Science department - 26 Social Science department - 22 Language department - 32
- Classes offered: Life Science, Health Science, Computer Science, Specialized Science
- Nickname: KMB
- Yearbook: The Laureate
- Website: banting.km.edu.my

Kolej MARA Banting (English: MARA College Banting; abbreviated KMB or MCB; formerly known as MRSM Banting)

== History ==
MCB is an International Baccalaureate World School since October 1990.

Its history began in 1985 when the GCE A-Level programme was introduced in MARA Junior Science College Seremban (MRSM Seremban, now known as Kolej MARA Seremban). To diversify the number of universities that students can apply to, in 1991 the college introduced a new pre-university programme: the IB Diploma Programme. (The IB programme is recognised for admission into universities around the world.)

To accommodate the growing programmes and students, a new 84-acre campus in Banting was constructed. On 1 July 1992, the new campus started operations under the name MRSM Banting with a 71 International Baccalaureate students from MRSM Cheras and 310 GCE A-Level students from MRSM Cheras and MRSM Seremban.

In 1994, the name of the junior college was changed to Kolej MARA Banting (MARA College Banting) to differentiate the college from the other MARA Junior Science Colleges and appropriately reflect the pre-university student body. The IB diploma depicts the name MARA College Banting in the transcript. The college has 94 lecturers with 41 support staff running day-to-day activities. Since May 2003, MARA College Banting has become a full-fledged 'IB World School'. Previously, MARA College Banting offered other pre-university programmes such as GCE A-Level and Matriculation but now only the IB

== Campus ==
The college campus is in the town of Bukit Changgang, Banting. Nearby points of interest include Kuala Lumpur International Airport, Putrajaya, and Cyberjaya.

== Gallery ==
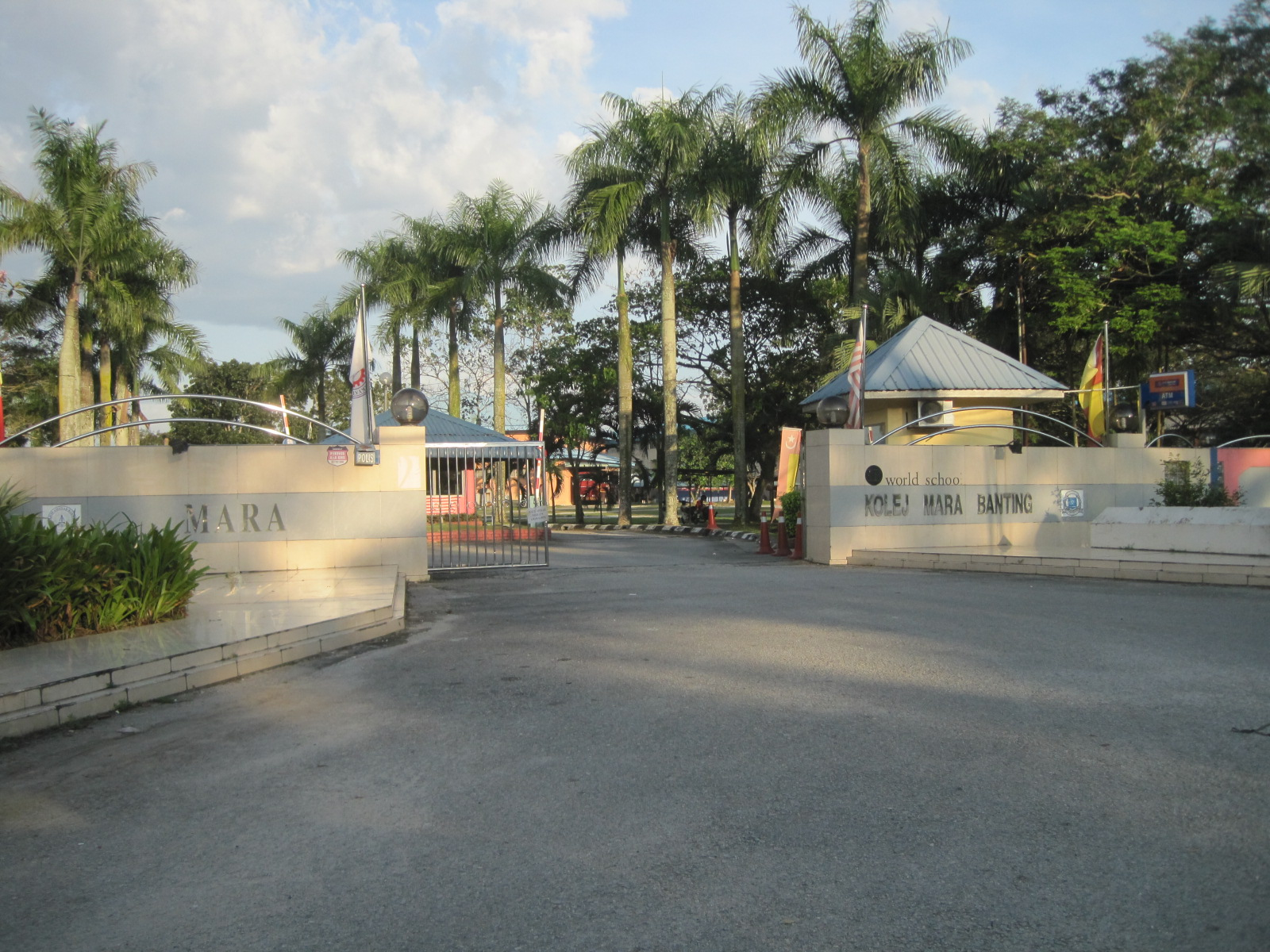
Entrance Gate

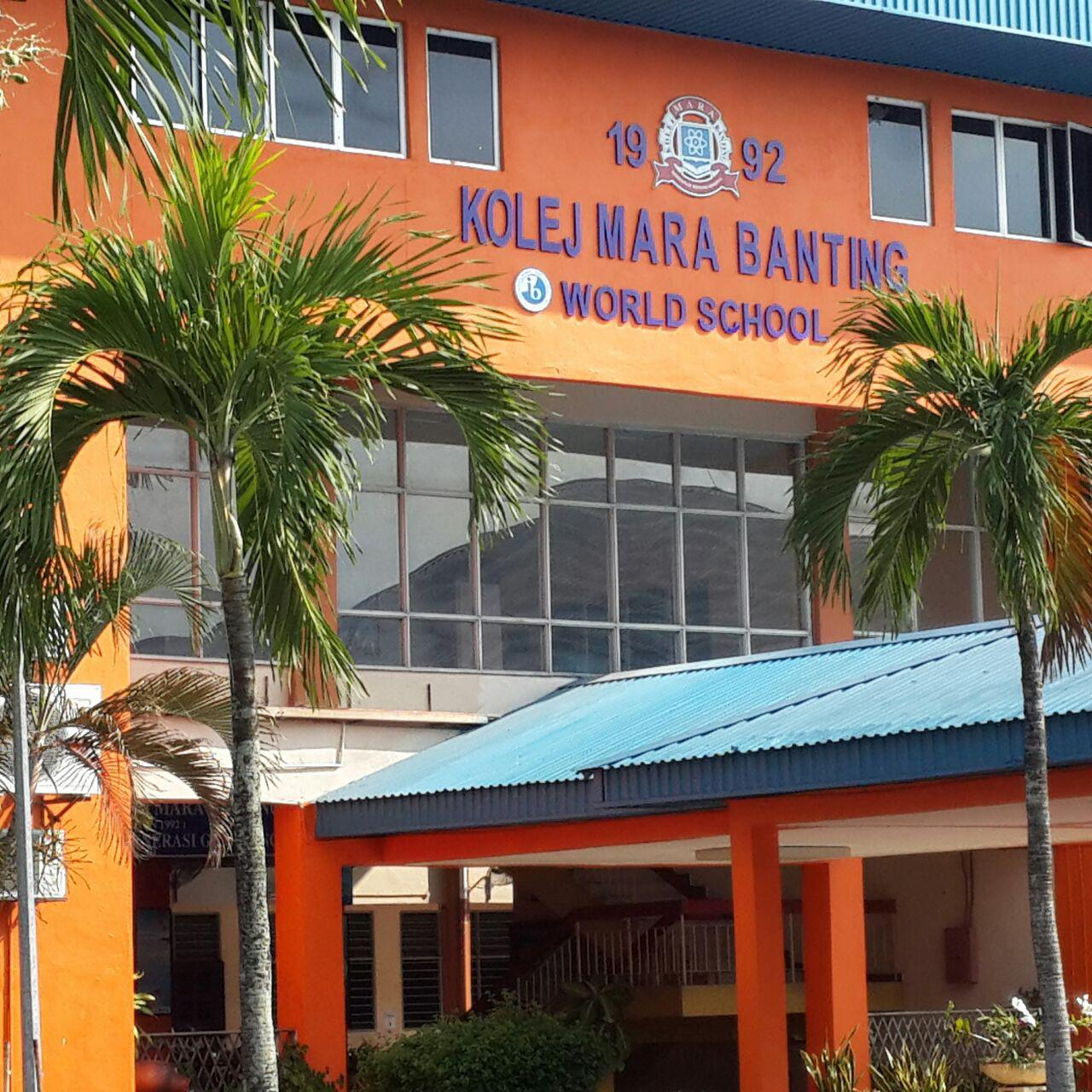
Main Building

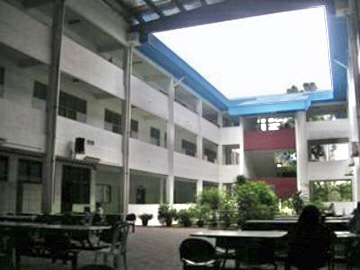
Academic Building
