= Long Kinoman =

- Location within Borneo
- Coordinates: 4.26667°N 115.61667°E
- Country: Malaysia
- State: Sarawak
- Administrative Division: Lawas
- Elevation: 1,142 m (3,747 ft)

Long Kinoman is a settlement in the Lawas division of Sarawak, Malaysia. It lies approximately 658.7 kilometres (409 mi) east-north-east of the state capital Kuching.

Neighbouring settlements include:

- Punang Terusan 1.9 kilometres (1.2 mi) north
- Long Semado 4.1 kilometres (2.5 mi) southwest
- Long Semado Nasab 4.1 kilometres (2.5 mi) southwest
- Long Tanid 6.7 kilometres (4.2 mi) southwest
- Long Lapukan 9.2 kilometres (5.7 mi) west
- Long Beluyu 9.3 kilometres (5.8 mi) southwest
- Long Karabangan 10.5 kilometres (6.5 mi) southwest
- Long Lopeng 14.9 kilometres (9.3 mi) west
- Long Merarap 19.1 kilometres (11.9 mi) northwest
- Long Buang 19.7 kilometres (12.2 mi) northwest
