= Long Nawi =

- Location within Borneo
- Coordinates: 4.01667°N 115.61667°E
- Country: Malaysia
- State: Sarawak
- Administrative Division: Lawas
- Elevation: 968 m (3,176 ft)

Long Nawi is a settlement in the Lawas division of Sarawak, Malaysia. It lies approximately 646.7 kilometres (402 mi) east-north-east of the state capital Kuching.

Neighbouring settlements include:

- Long Talal Buda 0 kilometres (0.0 mi) north
- Pa Rusa 1.9 kilometres (1.2 mi) south
- Long Ritan 1.9 kilometres (1.2 mi) south
- Budok Aru 3.7 kilometres (2.3 mi) north
- Long Lamutut 3.7 kilometres (2.3 mi) south
- Long Langai 3.7 kilometres (2.3 mi) south
- Long Muda 3.7 kilometres (2.3 mi) south
- Long Komap 3.7 kilometres (2.3 mi) south
- Ba Kelalan 3.7 kilometres (2.3 mi) south
- Pa Tawing 5.2 kilometres (3.2 mi) northeast
