= Long Lopeng =

- Location within Borneo
- Coordinates: 4.28333°N 115.48333°E
- Country: Malaysia
- State: Sarawak
- Administrative Division: Lawas
- Elevation: 2,054 m (6,739 ft)

Long Lopeng (also known as Luping) is a settlement in the Lawas division of Sarawak, Malaysia. It lies approximately 646.4 kilometres (402 mi) east-north-east of the state capital Kuching.

The 150 km logging track from Lawas to Ba'kelalan passes through Long Lopeng. Neighbouring settlements include:

- Long Lapukan 5.9 kilometres (3.7 mi) east
- Long Merarap 7.6 kilometres (4.7 mi) north
- Long Semado 11.7 kilometres (7.3 mi) east
- Long Karabangan 11.9 kilometres (7.4 mi) southeast
- Long Beluyu 13.1 kilometres (8.1 mi) southeast
- Long Buang 13.1 kilometres (8.1 mi) north
- Long Tanid 13.3 kilometres (8.3 mi) southeast
- Long Semado Nasab 14.1 kilometres (8.8 mi) southeast
- Punang Terusan 14.8 kilometres (9.2 mi) east
- Long Kinoman 14.9 kilometres (9.3 mi) east

== Notable people ==
- Baru Bian
