= Lawas Bridge =

Batang Lawas Bridge Jambatan Lawas
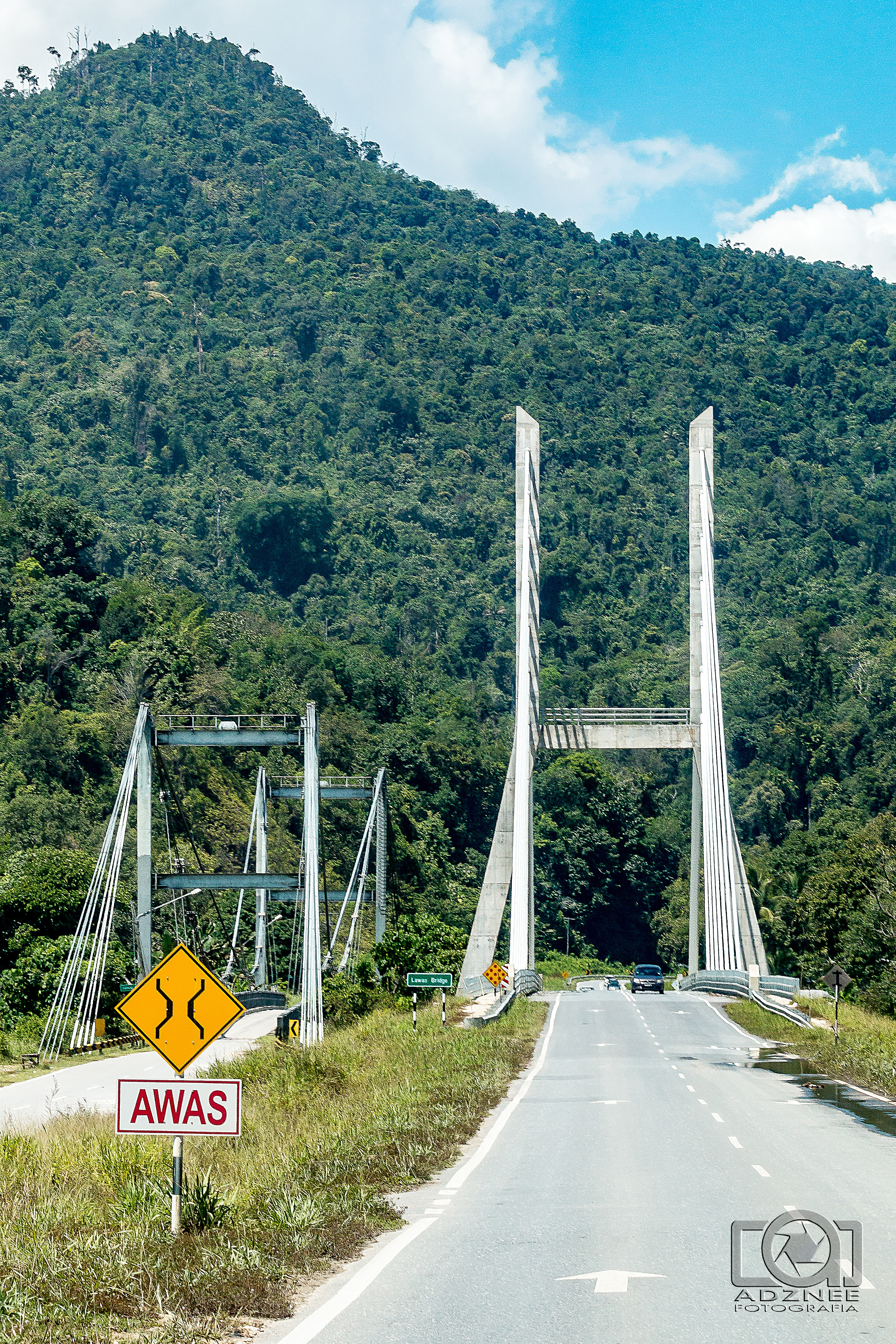
- Carries: Motor vehicles
- Crosses: Lawas River
- Locale: Federal Route 1 Lawas-Merapok-Sindumin Highway
- Official name: Lawas Bridge
- Maintained by: Sarawak Public Works Department (JKR)

Characteristics
- Design: New bridge: cable stayed bridge Old bridge: suspension bridge

History
- Designer: State Government of Sarawak; Sarawak Public Works Department (JKR)
- Constructed by: Sarawak Public Works Department (JKR)
- Opened: New bridge: 2014

The Lawas Bridge or Batang Lawas Bridge is a bridge near Lawas town in Limbang Division, Sarawak, Malaysia. Located at the Lawas-Merapok-Sindumin Highway FT1, the bridge was originally the only suspension bridge in Sarawak, that was designed for motor vehicles. The old suspension bridge was ultimately replaced by a single-tower cable-stayed bridge in 2014.

== Overview ==
The Batang Lawas Bridge was originally the only suspension bridge being designed for motor vehicles. Ironically, longer bridges such as the Lanang Bridge, Durin Bridge and ASEAN Bridge were all constructed as either box girder bridges, as cantilever bridges, or as girder bridges, resulting shorter span. In addition, the old Lawas Bridge was only a lane wide, and the road traffic had to take turns to cross the Batang Lawas, causing severe congestion during festive season. As a result, a wider 2-lane replacement bridge was proposed as a Tenth Malaysia Plan project. Constructed at the total cost of RM29.79 million, the construction started on 19 January 2012 and was completed on 18 July 2014.
