= Long Tuma =

- Location within Borneo
- Coordinates: 4.8°N 115.4°E
- Country: Malaysia
- State: Sarawak
- Administrative Division: Lawas
- Elevation: 97 m (318 ft)

Long Tuma is a settlement in the Lawas division of Sarawak, Malaysia. It lies approximately 667.1 kilometres (415 mi) east-north-east of the state capital Kuching.

Neighbouring settlements include:

- Long Sabuloh 3.7 kilometres (2.3 mi) south
- Kampung Gaya 3.7 kilometres (2.3 mi) north
- Kampung Belu 5.6 kilometres (3.5 mi) south
- Lawas 5.6 kilometres (3.5 mi) north
- Kampung Pangaleh 5.8 kilometres (3.6 mi) east
- Kampung Lawas 5.9 kilometres (3.7 mi) north
- Kampung Sitakong 5.9 kilometres (3.7 mi) north
- Kampung Surabaya 8.3 kilometres (5.2 mi) northeast
- Kampung Sulai 10.8 kilometres (6.7 mi) northwest
- Kampung Melipat 11.1 kilometres (6.9 mi) north
