= Long Sukang Airport =

Long Sukang Airport Lapangan Terbang Long Sukang
- IATA: LSU; ICAO: WBGU

Summary
- Airport type: Public
- Operator: Malaysia Airports Berhad
- Serves: Long Sukang, Sarawak, Malaysia
- Time zone: MST (UTC+08:00)
- Elevation AMSL: 1,200 ft / 366 m
- Coordinates: 04°33′08″N 115°29′38″E

Map
- Location in East Malaysia

Runways
Direction	Length		Surface
Direction	m	ft	Surface
n/a	402	1,319
- Sources: Great Circle Mapper

Long Sukang Airport (IATA: LSU, ICAO: WBGU) is a small airport near Long Sukang, a Lun Bawang settlement in the Lawas division of Sarawak, Malaysia, and is one of four airports in the Lawas division.

Improvements to this rural airfield were carried out in 1974 by the Malaysian Public Works Department (Jabatan Kerja Raya), and were substantially completed by the end of the year; the airfield opened to scheduled Malaysia Airlines (MAS) flights in April 1975. This airfield, together with those at Long Semadoh and Ba'kelalan, helped to accelerate development among the Lun Bawang people.

No accidents have been recorded at this airport. There are currently no scheduled flights using Long Sukang airport.

== See also ==
- List of airports in Malaysia
