= Deutsches Herzzentrum Berlin =

Medical research centre in Berlin, Germany

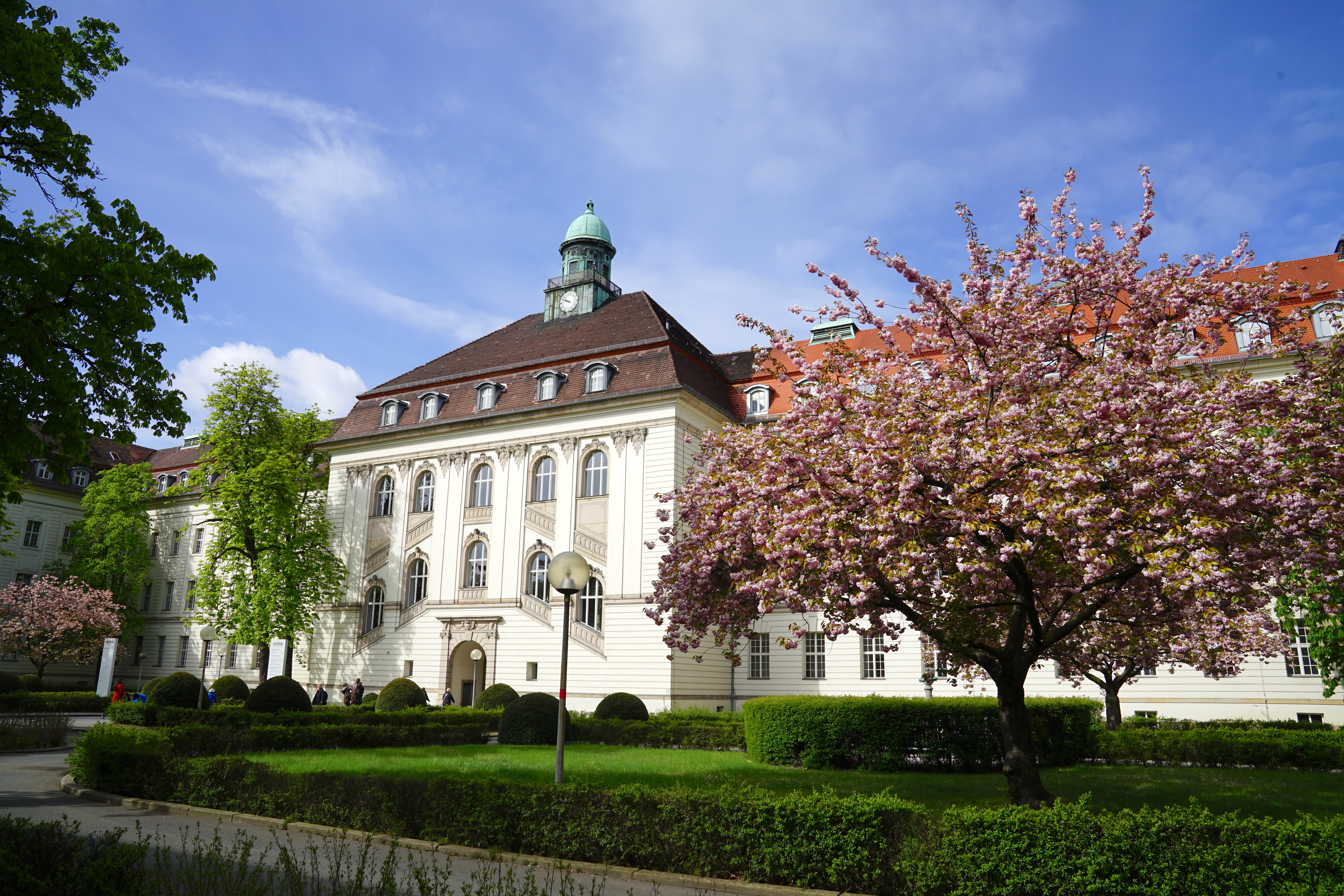
- Deutsches Herzzentrum Berlin on Campus Virchow Charité

Geography
- Location: Augustenburger Platz 1, 13353, Berlin, Germany
- Coordinates: 52°32′32″N 13°20′49″E

Organisation
- Funding: Public hospital

Services
- Beds: approx. 200

History
- Opened: 1986

Links
- Website: https://www.dhzc.charite.de/

The Deutsches Herzzentrum Berlin (DHZB) is a medical research centre in Berlin, Germany, specialised in cardiovascular disease, as well as cardiopulmonary transplantation.

The hospital has two CMR scanners. A new heart centre is planned to be built in 2018 and finish construction in 2021.
