= Long Ugong =

- Location within Borneo
- Coordinates: 4.08333°N 115.61667°E
- Country: Malaysia
- State: Sarawak
- Administrative Division: Lawas
- Elevation: 1,549 m (5,082 ft)

Long Ugong is a settlement in the Lawas division of Sarawak, Malaysia. It lies approximately 649.8 kilometres (404 mi) east-north-east of the state capital Kuching.

Neighbouring settlements include:

- Budok Aru 3.7 kilometres (2.3 mi) south
- Pa Tawing 5.2 kilometres (3.2 mi) southeast
- Long Nawi 7.4 kilometres (4.6 mi) south
- Long Talal Buda 7.4 kilometres (4.6 mi) south
- Long Ritan 9.3 kilometres (5.8 mi) south
- Pa Rusa 9.3 kilometres (5.8 mi) south
- Long Muda 11.1 kilometres (6.9 mi) south
- Ba Kelalan 11.1 kilometres (6.9 mi) south
- Long Komap 11.1 kilometres (6.9 mi) south
- Long Langai 11.1 kilometres (6.9 mi) south
