= Kolej MARA Seremban =

College in Seremban, Negeri Sembilan, Malaysia

MARA College Seremban
- Kolej MARA Seremban
- Seremban, Negeri Sembilan 70100; Malaysia

Information
- Type: State public boarding school
- Motto: Excellent Education Breeds a Glorious Generation.
- Founded: 1972
- Director: Dr Sa'aidah Bt Abdul Rahman (Deputy Director Student Affairs) Mohamed Bin Baharuddin (Deputy Director Academic Affairs) Nor Azizah Bt Ab Rahman
- Language: English
- Nickname: KMS
- Yearbook: Kaleidoscope
- Website: www.kmseremban.edu.my

Kolej MARA Seremban (English: MARA College Seremban; abbreviated KMS; formerly known as MRSM Seremban) was established in 1972. The college can accommodate up to 550 students per academic year. It is one of the four pre-university colleges operated by Majlis Amanah Rakyat (MARA) and is state funded. It is one of the few institutions in Malaysia that provides the A-LevelsProgramme.

== History ==
The college began its first few years as one of the first Maktab Rendah Sains MARA to be established by the organisation in 1972. 150 male students from all over Malaysia were enrolled in its first intake. During this time, the institution offers only the standard Malaysian curriculum for secondary students ranging from Form 1 to Form 5. The programme ended in 1985.

In 1978, the college introduced the University Kebangsaan Malaya Science Matriculation Programme. It ran concurrently with the existing secondary school curriculum. The college then introduced the GCE A-Levels programme in 1985; however, the programme ceased in 1988. From this year through 1992, the college changed its name to Kolej Pengajian Tinggi MARA, or MARA Higher Education College, and was under the administration of Yayasan Pelajaran MARA. It introduced another programme in 1988: the Northern Consortium University Degree Programme.

MARA took over the administration in 1992, and has reinstated the UKM Matriculation Programme with the addition of two additional courses: Science and Accounting. The college became formally known as Kolej MARA Seremban on 3 February 1994.

In 2000, The UKM Matriculation Programme was abolished to make way for the Malaysian Education Ministry Matriculation Programme. This change was made as the Ministry of Education Malaysia took over all matriculation programmes in the country to unify the curriculum. The programme ended on 14 April 2005.

The GCE A Levels programme was reinstated in 2002.

The college gained the International Baccalaureate World School certification and was authorised to offer the IB Diploma Programme in April 2005. The college was then put under the administration of a subdivision of MARA, the MARA Higher Education Department on 11 January 2007.
