= Long Lapukan =

- Location within Borneo
- Coordinates: 4.26667°N 115.53333°E
- Country: Malaysia
- State: Sarawak
- Administrative Division: Lawas
- Elevation: 1,504 m (4,934 ft)

Long Lapukan is a settlement in the Lawas division of Sarawak, Malaysia. It lies approximately 650.5 kilometres (404 mi) east-north-east of the state capital Kuching.

Neighbouring settlements include:

- Long Lopeng 5.9 kilometres (3.7 mi) west
- Long Semado 5.9 kilometres (3.7 mi) east
- Long Karabangan 7.6 kilometres (4.7 mi) south
- Long Tanid 7.9 kilometres (4.9 mi) southeast
- Long Semado Nasab 8.3 kilometres (5.2 mi) southeast
- Long Beluyu 8.3 kilometres (5.2 mi) southeast
- Long Kinoman 9.2 kilometres (5.7 mi) east
- Punang Terusan 9.4 kilometres (5.8 mi) east
- Long Merarap 11.9 kilometres (7.4 mi) northwest
- Long Buang 15.3 kilometres (9.5 mi) north
