= MARA Junior Science College =

School network in Malaysia

MARA Junior Science College (MJSC)
- Maktab Rendah Sains Mara (MRSM)
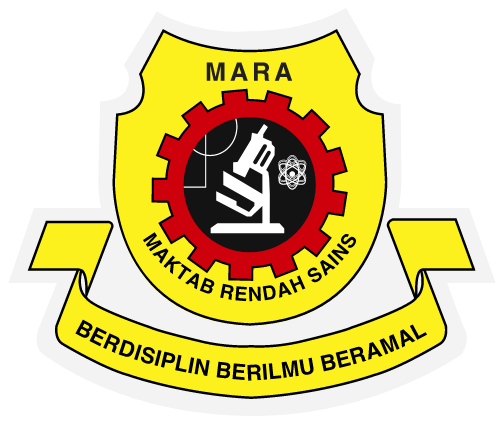
- Malaysia

Information
- Type: Public, Secondary school, Boarding school, Fully residential school, Mixed-gender education
- Motto: Berdisiplin, Berilmu, Beramal
- Established: February 1972
- Grades: Form 1 – Form 5
- Enrollment: 500++, depending on each campus' capacity
- Language: Malay, English
- Colours: Brown, blue, yellow
- Affiliations: Sekolah Berasrama Penuh, Ministry of Education (Malaysia), Majlis Amanah Rakyat
- Website: www.mara.gov.my

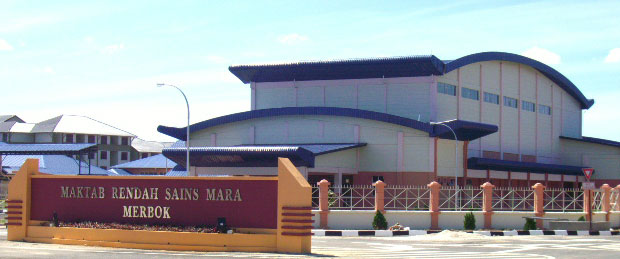
MRSM Merbok in Kedah

MARA Junior Science Colleges (MJSC) (Malay: Maktab Rendah Sains MARA (MRSM)), is a network of boarding schools founded by the People's Trust Council (PTC) (Malay: Majlis Amanah Rakyat (MARA)), a Malaysian governmental organization. These schools offer educational resources for students across various regions in Malaysia.

== History ==
The inaugural MRSM was founded in Seremban in February 1972, welcoming its pioneer intake of 150 students, exclusively male, from across Malaysia. MJSC Seremban ceased admitting students in 1986 and transitioned gradually into Kolej MARA Seremban, a process completed officially in February 1994.

== Academic system ==
Students are primarily assessed through a system similar to the grading systems in universities and/or colleges: the grade point average (GPA) (Malay: Purata Nilaian Gred (PNG) system. By the end of their final semesters, they will be awarded a certificate of graduation for those who succeeded to pass with at least a cumulative grade point average (CGPA) (Malay: Timbunan Purata Nilaian Gred (TPNG)) of 3.50 and above.

MRSMs adhere to the conventional academic progression structure prevalent in Malaysia, wherein students advance sequentially from Year 7 (referred to as Form 1) through Year 11 (Form 5) based on age, without a mechanism for transitional advancement based on individual capabilities. While the majority of MRSMs operate across all levels from Form 1 to Form 5, three MRSMs exclusively offer Forms 4 and 5. As of 2015, there are no MRSMs solely dedicated to Forms 1 to 3. Formerly restricted to lower forms, several MRSMs, including MRSM Pasir Tumboh and MRSM Gerik, commenced admitting students for Form 4 in 2015, subsequently sitting for the SPM examination in 2016.

Regular MRSM applicants take the Form 3 Assessment (Malay: Pentaksiran Tingkatan 3 (PT3)) exam and the Malaysian Education Certificate (Malay: Sijil Pelajaran Malaysia (SPM)) national examinations, whereby IGCSE adhering MRSMs will take the IGCSE exam by Form 4.

Students who started from Form 1 can continue their studies in MRSM until Form 5 in the same college or by transferring to another college. MRSM implemented Dual Language Programme (DLP) but the medium of teaching is mostly conducted in English.

== Location ==
As of 2022, there were 57 MARA Junior Science Colleges (MRSMs) across Malaysia, with 48 in Peninsular Malaysia and 9 in East Malaysia. Each state has at least two MRSMs, while no campus has yet been established in the Federal Territories of Kuala Lumpur, Putrajaya, or Labuan, despite plans for one in Labuan since 2015. Perak hosts the most MRSMs with nine campuses, including MRSM Bagan Datuk, opened in 2021 and offering the Ulul Albab programme.

Most MRSMs are named after their locations (e.g., MRSM Kuantan, MRSM Kuala Terengganu, MRSM Muar), while others honour prominent national figures, such as MRSM Tun Abdul Razak, MRSM Sultan Azlan Shah, and MRSM Tun Ghafar Baba.

Certain MRSMs cater to specific groups: MRSM Terendak and MRSM PDRM Kulim primarily serve children of armed forces and police personnel, while MRSM ATM Bera in Pahang, completed in 2020, focuses on students from military families.

Several campuses were developed through collaboration with government or private entities. MRSM FELDA Trolak (Perak, 2008) was built within a FELDA settlement with shared funding, while MRSM Bintulu (Sarawak, 2024) was fully sponsored by PETRONAS. MRSM Ranau (Sabah, 2024) is the highest-altitude MRSM, situated 721 metres above sea level near Mount Kinabalu, established through a partnership between PETRONAS, the Sabah state government, and MARA.

== See also ==
- Sekolah Berasrama Penuh
