= Kampung Sitakong =

- Location within Borneo
- Coordinates: 4.85°N 115.41667°E
- Country: Malaysia
- State: Sarawak
- Administrative Division: Lawas
- Elevation: 89 m (292 ft)

Kampung Sitakong is a settlement in the Lawas division of Sarawak, Malaysia. It lies approximately 671.7 kilometres (417 mi) east-north-east of the state capital Kuching.

Neighbouring settlements include:

- Kampung Lawas 0 kilometres (0.0 mi) north
- Lawas 1.8 kilometres (1.1 mi) west
- Kampung Surabaya 2.6 kilometres (1.6 mi) northeast
- Kampung Gaya 2.6 kilometres (1.6 mi) southwest
- Kampung Pangaleh 5.2 kilometres (3.2 mi) southeast
- Kampung Melipat 5.9 kilometres (3.7 mi) north
- Long Tuma 5.9 kilometres (3.7 mi) south
- Kampung Tagai Bangkor 7.6 kilometres (4.7 mi) north
- Kampung Sulai 8.3 kilometres (5.2 mi) northwest
- Punang 9.3 kilometres (5.8 mi) northwest
