= Majlis Amanah Rakyat =

Malaysian government agency

- MARA

Agency overview
- Formed: 1 March 1966; 60 years ago
- Jurisdiction: Malaysia
- Headquarters: Ibu Pejabat MARA 21, Jalan Raja Laut 50609 Kuala Lumpur
- Agency executives: Datuk Asyraf Wajdi Dusuki, Chairman; YBhg Datuk Zulfikri Bin Osman, Director General
- Parent agency: Ministry of Rural and Regional Development
- Website: www.mara.gov.my

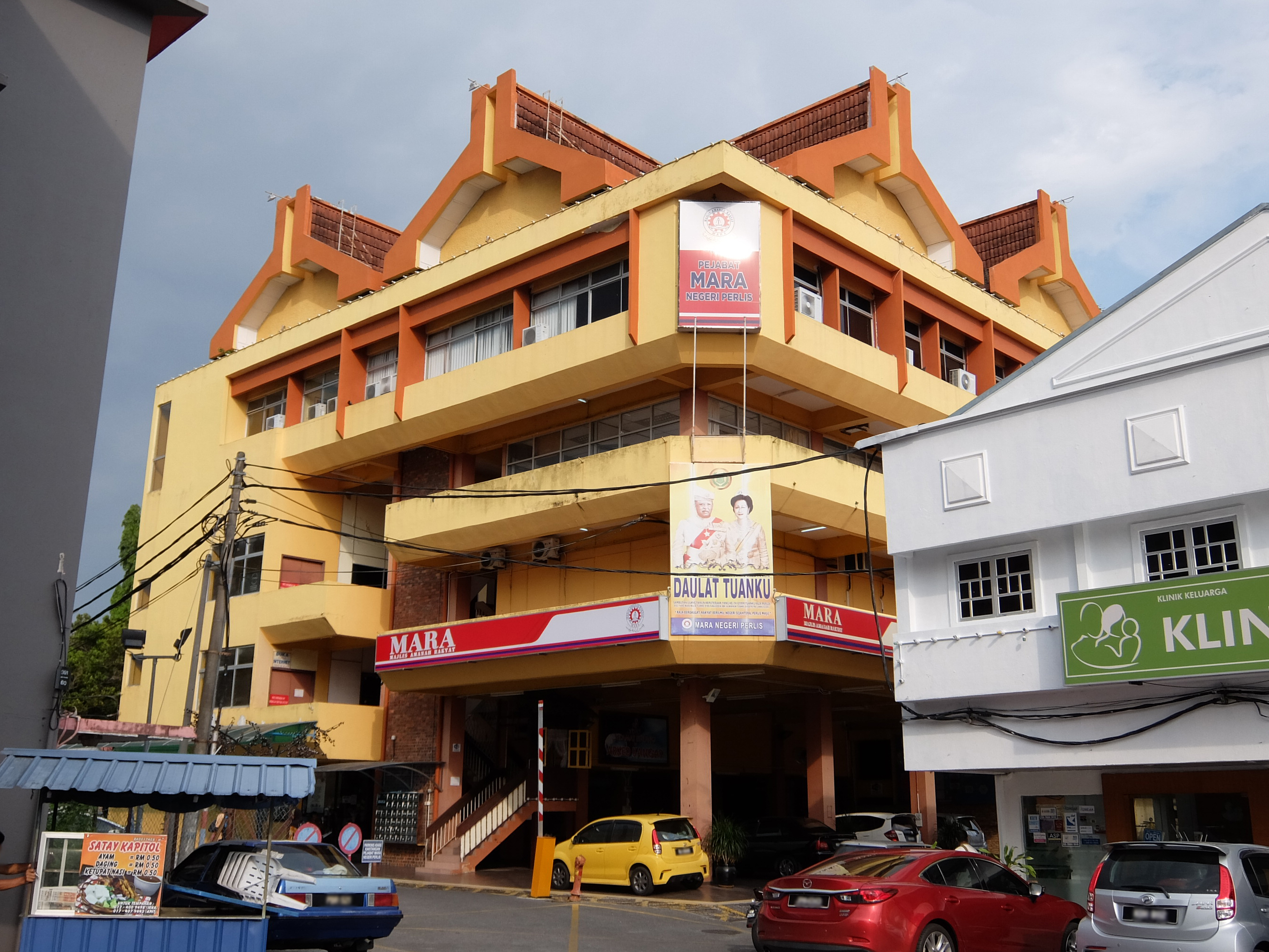
MARA office in Kangar, Perlis.

Majlis Amanah Rakyat (MARA; lit. 'People's Trust Council') is a Malaysian government agency. It was formed to aid, train, and guide Bumiputra (Malays and other indigenous Malaysians) in the areas of business and industry. MARA was formed on 1 March 1966, under the Rural and National Development Ministry.

== History and organization ==
The Rural Industrial Development Authority (RIDA) was established in 1951 by the British colonial administration as a program to provide economic assistance and support to Malay farmers and rural inhabitants. The organization expanded its scope and the Parliament of Malaysia converted it into MARA in 1966. Although it is an autonomous government agency, it reports to the Minister of Rural and Regional Development, who appoints all the members of the MARA Council. Besides state-level offices in the 13 states of Malaysia and the federal territory of Kuala Lumpur, MARA operates three overseas offices in London, Washington, D.C., and Alexandria, Egypt.

== Entrepreneurship aid ==
Among other activities, MARA offers loans to Bumiputra entrepreneurs. Such loans may be repaid either in the conventional Western manner or via Islamic banking, better known as the Sharia system. MARA also offers business starter courses, vocational training, consultancy services, and marketing help for Bumiputra entrepreneurs.

MARA lends Bumiputra entrepreneurs facilities, such as shop-lots or factories, at a subsidized rate. These facilities are often built in smaller towns or underdeveloped areas to encourage economic development.

== Education ==
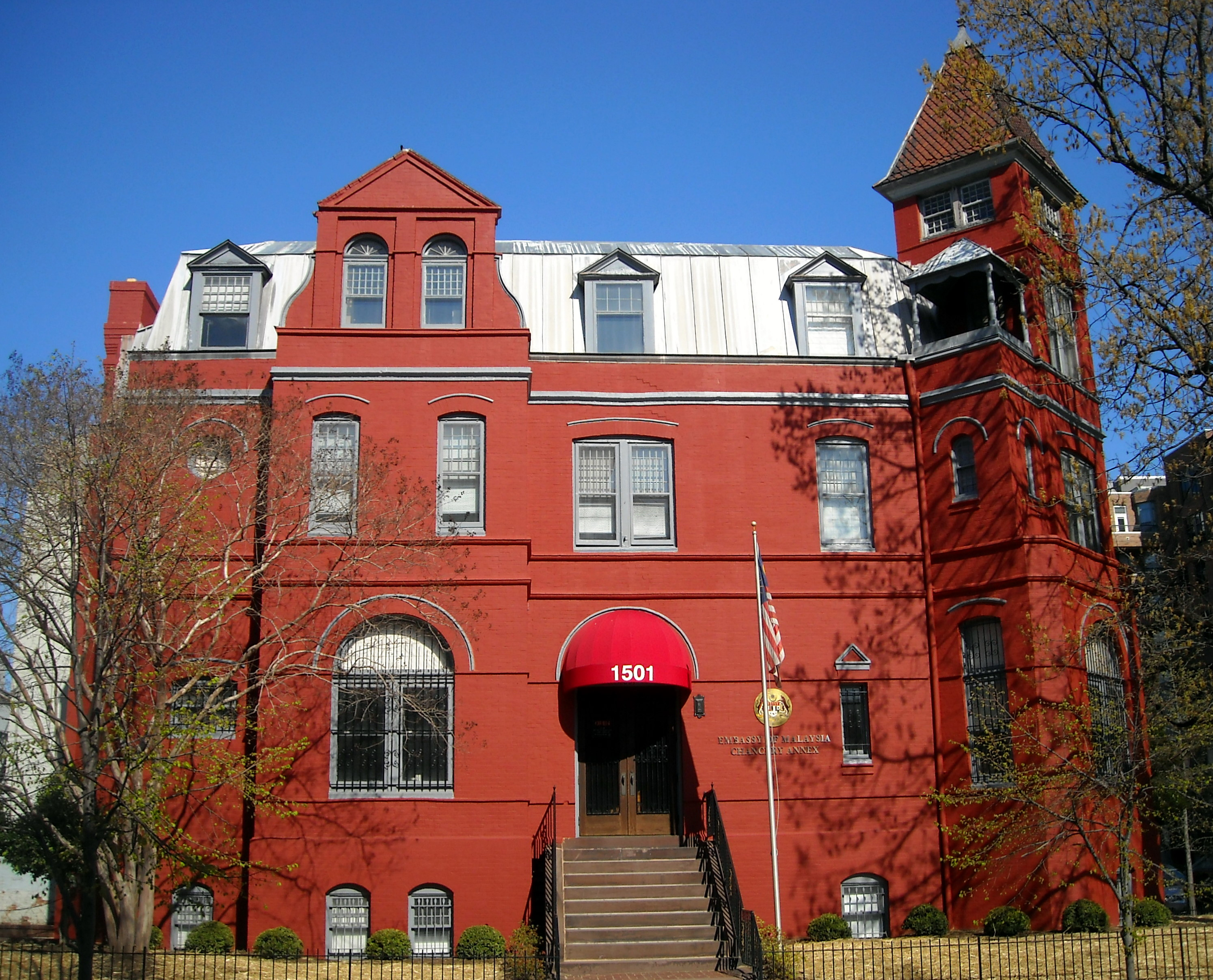
MARA Students Office located in Washington, D.C.

MARA operates several junior colleges or boarding schools and the University of Kuala Lumpur, a multi-campus technical university. Until 1976, Universiti Teknologi MARA was also operated by MARA, though it has since become its own entity under the Ministry of Higher Education. The junior colleges, referred to as Maktab Rendah Sains MARA (MARA Junior Science Colleges, often abbreviated as MRSMs), are operated by the Education and Training (Secondary) Department of MARA. Their stated mission is to "produce Bumiputra students of potential in science and technology".

Until 2005, the MRSMs were only open to Bumiputra students. However, following the Barisan Nasional government's pledge during its campaign in the 2004 general election, a quota of 10% of all places in MRSMs was granted to non-Bumiputras. In admissions, preference is given to students from low-income families, rural areas, and/or those living in squatter settlements in the cities.

In addition to MRSMs and the UniKL, MARA operates vocational and professional colleges such as Pusat GIAT MARA, Institut Kemahiran MARA (IKM) and Kolej Kemahiran MARA. These vocational colleges provide a second higher education option to students who are unable to continue their studies in universities. Other colleges include Kolej Kemahiran Tinggi MARA, Institut Kemahiran MARA, Kolej Professional MARA, and Kolej MARA.

Scholarships are offered to Bumiputra students to attend local and foreign institutions. Students are required to specialise in certain professions such as engineering, medicine, or accounting.

== Subsidiaries ==
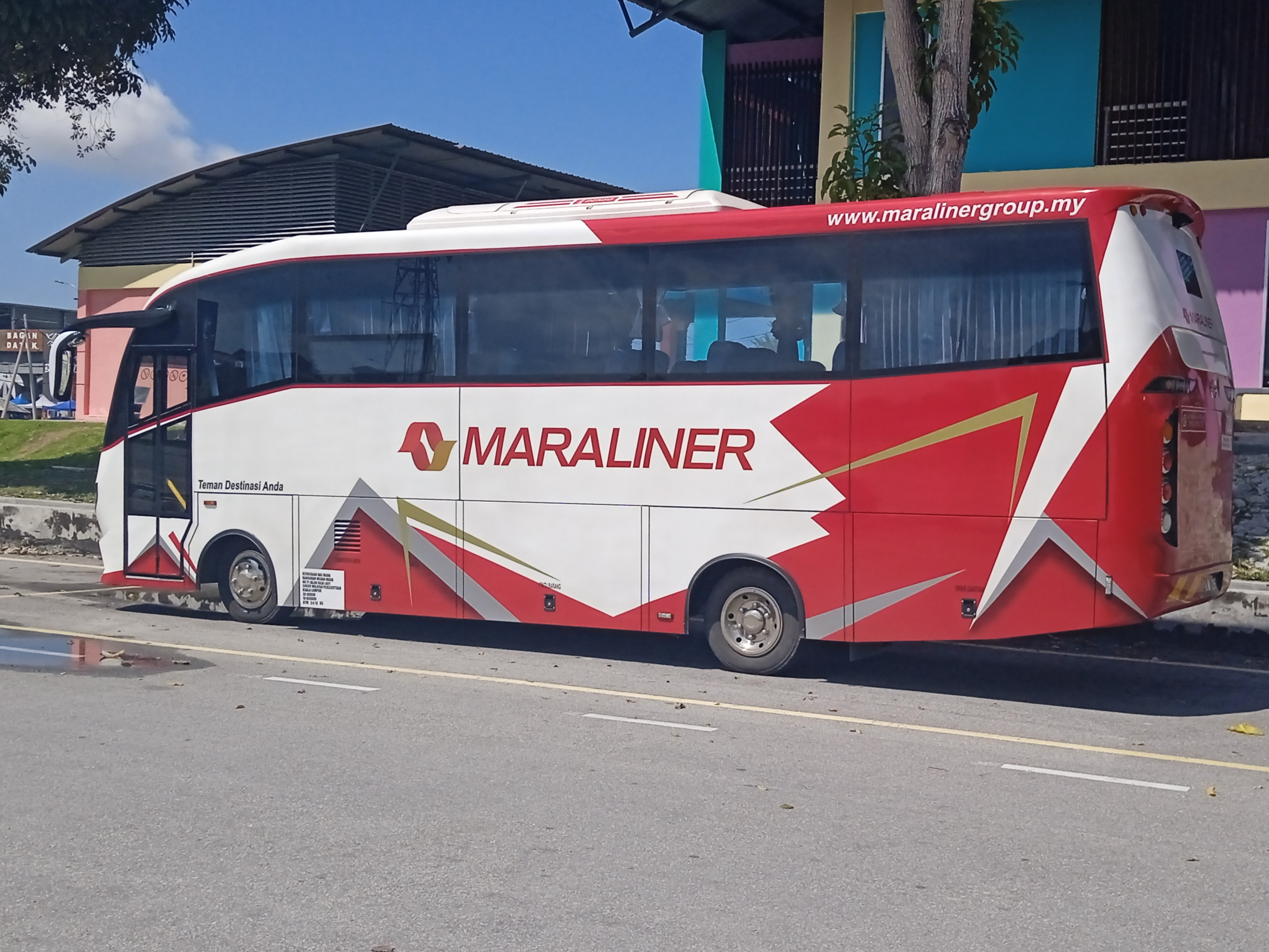
MARALiner bus at Bagan Datuk, Perak

- Kolej Poly-Tech MARA Sdn. Bhd. (Universiti Poly-Tech MARA – UPTM)
- Universiti Teknikal MARA Sdn. Bhd. (Universiti Kuala Lumpur – UniKL)
- German-Malaysian Institute (GMI)
- GIATMARA Sdn. Bhd. (GIATMARA)
- Pelaburan MARA Berhad (PMB)
- Yayasan Pelajaran MARA (YPM)
- Pusat Pembangunan Reka Bentuk Sdn. Bhd. (DDEC)
- F.I.T Center Sdn. Bhd. (FITEC)
- Asia Aerotechnic Sdn. Bhd. (AAT)
- MARALiner Sdn. Bhd (MLSB)
- Technology Park Malaysia College Sdn. Bhd. (TPM College)
- MARA Excellent Ventures Sdn. Bhd. (MEX)
- UniMARA Sdn. Bhd. (UniMARA)
- Rural Capital Sdn. Bhd. (RCSB)
- MARA Aerospace & Technologies Sdn. Bhd (M-AeroTech)
- YPM Realties Sdn. Bhd. (YPMR)
- MARA Incorporated Sdn. Bhd (MARA Inc.)
- Glocal Link (M) Sdn. Bhd (GLSB)
- MARA Corporation Sdn. Bhd. (MARA Corp.)

== See also ==
- Te Puni Kōkiri, an analogous body in New Zealand.
