= Punang Terusan =

- town
- Location in Sarawak, Malaysia
- Coordinates: 4°17′0″N 115°37′0″E
- Country: Malaysia
- State: Sarawak
- Elevation: 1,105 m (3,625 ft)
- Time zone: UTC+8 (Asia/Brunei)

Punang Terusan is a town or settlement in Sarawak, Malaysia situated approximately 3,628 feet (1,106 metres) above sea level. The approximate population within a seven-kilometer radius was 1,110 as of 2004.

Nearby towns and villages include Long Buang (9.9 nm north), Pa Brayong (11.7 nm north), Long Semado (2.8 nm south), Long Kinoman (1.0 nm south), Long Pa Sia (9.2 nm east), and Long Lapukan (5.1 nm west).
