= Lawas =

- Town and district capital

Other transcription(s)
  - Malay: Pekan Lawas
  - Chinese: 老越 (Traditional)
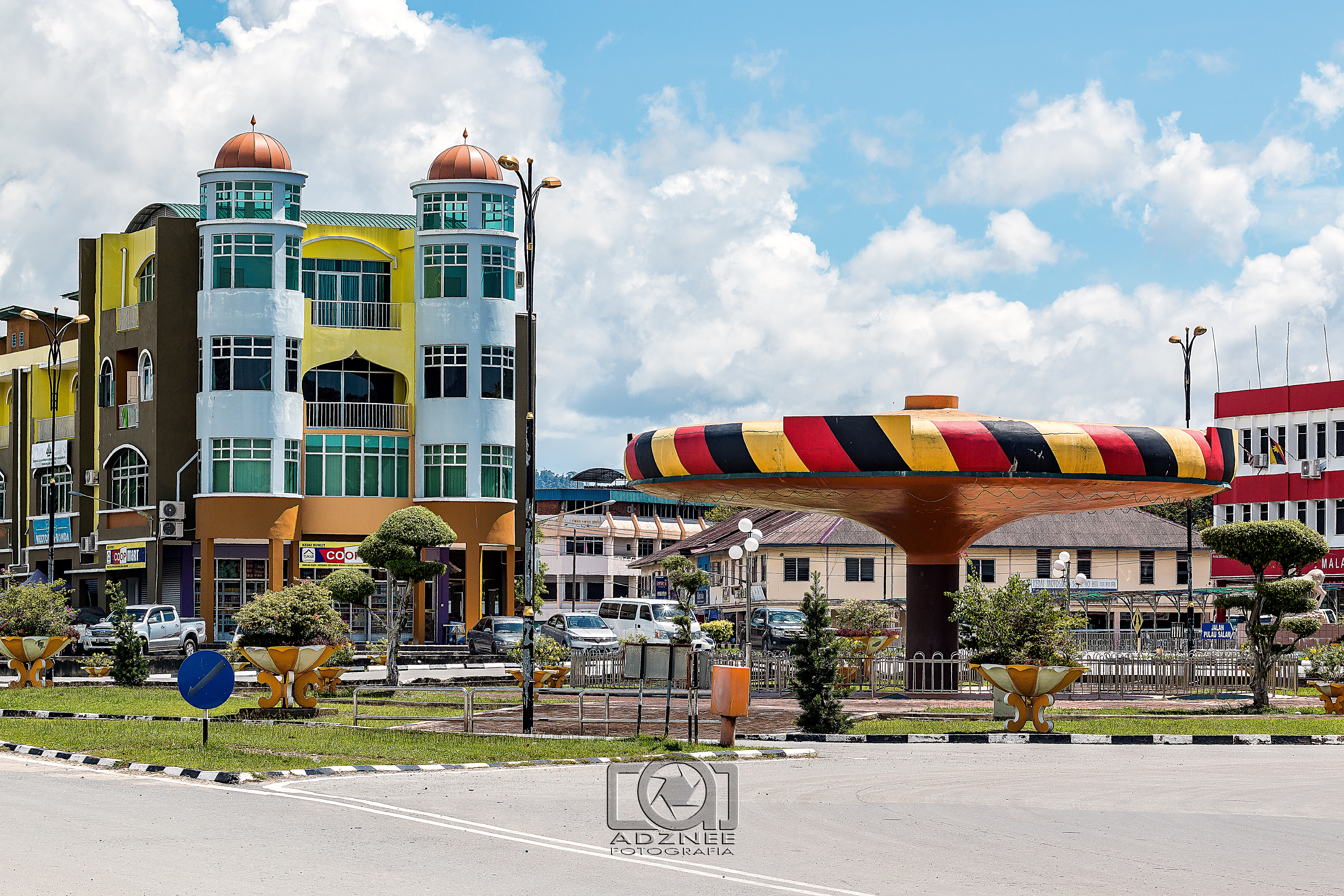
- Lawas town

- Seal

- Location within Borneo
- Coordinates: 4°50′0″N 115°24′0″E
- Country: Malaysia
- State: Sarawak
- Division: Limbang
- District: Lawas

Population (2020)
  - Total: 46,200
- Ethnicity: Lun Bawang, Bruneian Malay and Kedayan, Iban, Chinese, Others
- Website: https://lawasdc.sarawak.gov.my

Lawas (Malay: Pekan Lawas) is a small town and the capital of Lawas District, Limbang Division, Sarawak, Malaysia. This district area is 3,811.90 square kilometres, and population (year 2020 census) was 46,200. It is 1,200 km from the state capital, Kuching and 200 km from the capital city of Sabah, Kota Kinabalu.

== Etymology ==
There are several versions of the origin of the name "Lawas". It reportedly came from the Malay word luas which means "spacious". During earlier times, people tended to settle down in spacious areas and thus the town was born. In another version of the story, there was once a group of merchants who were attacked and chased by the pirates at the mouth of the Lawas river. The merchants managed to hid themselves in the middle of the jungle and the pirates could not find them. Feelling relieved and secure, the merchants returned to the sea. In the local dialect, "Lawas" means "relief, safe, and secure".

== History ==
On 7 September 1901, the British North Borneo Company (BNBC) had obtained the administrative rights of the Lawas river from Brunei Sultanate in order to stem the smuggling of weapons that worked against the BNBC government in North Borneo (present day Sabah) and the trading of slaves in the interior of the Lawas district. There were two types of rights exist in the Brunei administrative system: sungai kerajaan (government river) and sungai tulin (private river). Government control on the river includes the rights to all the minerals mined from the river and the right to interfere if there is any political disturbances around the river. Private ownership of the river functioned like a private inheritance which includes the right collect taxes from the residents living near the river.

At that time, Pengiran Abu Bakar and Pengiran Tajudin had the private ownership of the Lawas river. They refused to surrender their private ownerships to BNBC but keen to sell their rights to Kingdom of Sarawak. When the British Consul at Labuan decided that BNBC should take over the Lawas river by force, Pengiran Abu Bakar quickly invited Rajah Charles Brooke from Kingdom of Sarawak to govern the Lawas river. BNBC initially was unhappy with the Brooke involvement in the administration of Lawas river. However, in November 1904, BNBC decided the sell their administrative right to Brooke in view of private owners unwilling to cooperate with BNBC; taking Lawas river by force will only spark more rebellion against BNBC and drain the BNBC cash reserves. On 19 January 1905, an agreement was signed between BNBC and Rajah Charles Brooke which saw the official handover of Lawas river to the Brooke government in exchange of 5000 pounds and several administrative areas around Brunei bay to BNBC. An agreement was later reached with the private owners to sell Lawas river to the Brooke government with reparation of 6,000 dollars per year to the private owners.

== Government ==
Lawas is part of the Lawas District, which is part of the Limbang Division, which is part of Sarawak, Malaysia.

== Climate ==
Lawas has a tropical rainforest climate (Af) with heavy to very heavy rainfall year-round.

Climate data for Lawas
Month	Jan	Feb	Mar	Apr	May	Jun	Jul	Aug	Sep	Oct	Nov	Dec	Year
Mean daily maximum °C (°F)	30.0 (86.0)	30.0 (86.0)	30.7 (87.3)	31.4 (88.5)	31.5 (88.7)	31.3 (88.3)	31.1 (88.0)	31.0 (87.8)	30.9 (87.6)	30.7 (87.3)	30.5 (86.9)	30.5 (86.9)	30.8 (87.4)
Daily mean °C (°F)	27.0 (80.6)	27.1 (80.8)	27.5 (81.5)	28.0 (82.4)	28.2 (82.8)	27.9 (82.2)	27.7 (81.9)	27.6 (81.7)	27.5 (81.5)	27.4 (81.3)	27.3 (81.1)	27.4 (81.3)	27.6 (81.6)
Mean daily minimum °C (°F)	24.1 (75.4)	24.2 (75.6)	24.4 (75.9)	24.7 (76.5)	24.9 (76.8)	24.6 (76.3)	24.3 (75.7)	24.3 (75.7)	24.2 (75.6)	24.2 (75.6)	24.2 (75.6)	24.3 (75.7)	24.4 (75.9)
Average rainfall mm (inches)	396 (15.6)	252 (9.9)	254 (10.0)	298 (11.7)	359 (14.1)	311 (12.2)	308 (12.1)	388 (15.3)	418 (16.5)	402 (15.8)	414 (16.3)	378 (14.9)	4,178 (164.4)
Source: Climate-Data.org

== Demographics ==
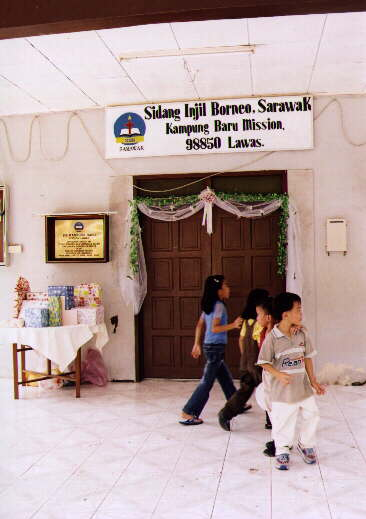
The Borneo Evangelical Mission (SIB) church

Lawas is made up of a population comprising Lun Bawang, Brunei Malay, Kedayan, and Chinese. The main spoken language is Brunei Malay, Kedayan, Lun Bawang and Hokkien.

== Economy ==
As with Limbang, the town is a busy transit point between Sarawak, Sabah, and Brunei. Timber and agriculture are the mainstays of the economy. The highland area known as Ba'Kelalan has been experimenting with the cultivation of apples. In addition, the tourism industry is being developed in Ba'Kelalan. However, these plans have been met with controversy due to the probable effects on several traditional tribal villages. Plans to develop small and middle scale industries in Lawas have been proposed by the state government. At this time much of the land in Lawas, Sundar and Trusan has been transformed from padi fields into oil palm plantations. Lawas is also known as the producer of smoked fish called 'Tahai' in local dialect. One of the villages that produces 'Tahai' commercially is Kampung Awat-Awat in the Sundar sub-district.

== Transport ==
=== Road ===
Lawas, by virtue of its geographical location, is cut off from the rest of Sarawak's road network. It is however linked by main road to Sabah and Brunei's Temburong district. There is a good local road network around Lawas district which is relatively free of traffic jams.

The Lawas Bridge is located near Lawas.

Travelling from Miri to Lawas would need to go through checkpoints in Brunei and Limbang, totaling eight immigration checkpoints. Drive from the town of Lawas to Sarawak-Sabah border requires 30 minutes.

Two road border crossings are located in Lawas district:

- Mengkalap: It enters Labu in Temburong district, Brunei with Immigration, Customs and Quarantine Complex constructed here. Previously it was operating temporarily from a shoplot in Trusan Bazaar, 8 km from the actual Brunei-Malaysia border.
- Merapok: Immigration guard posts are located here which borders with Sindumin checkpoint located in Sabah. In 2015, Merapok-Sindumin guard posts handled 700,000 visitors.
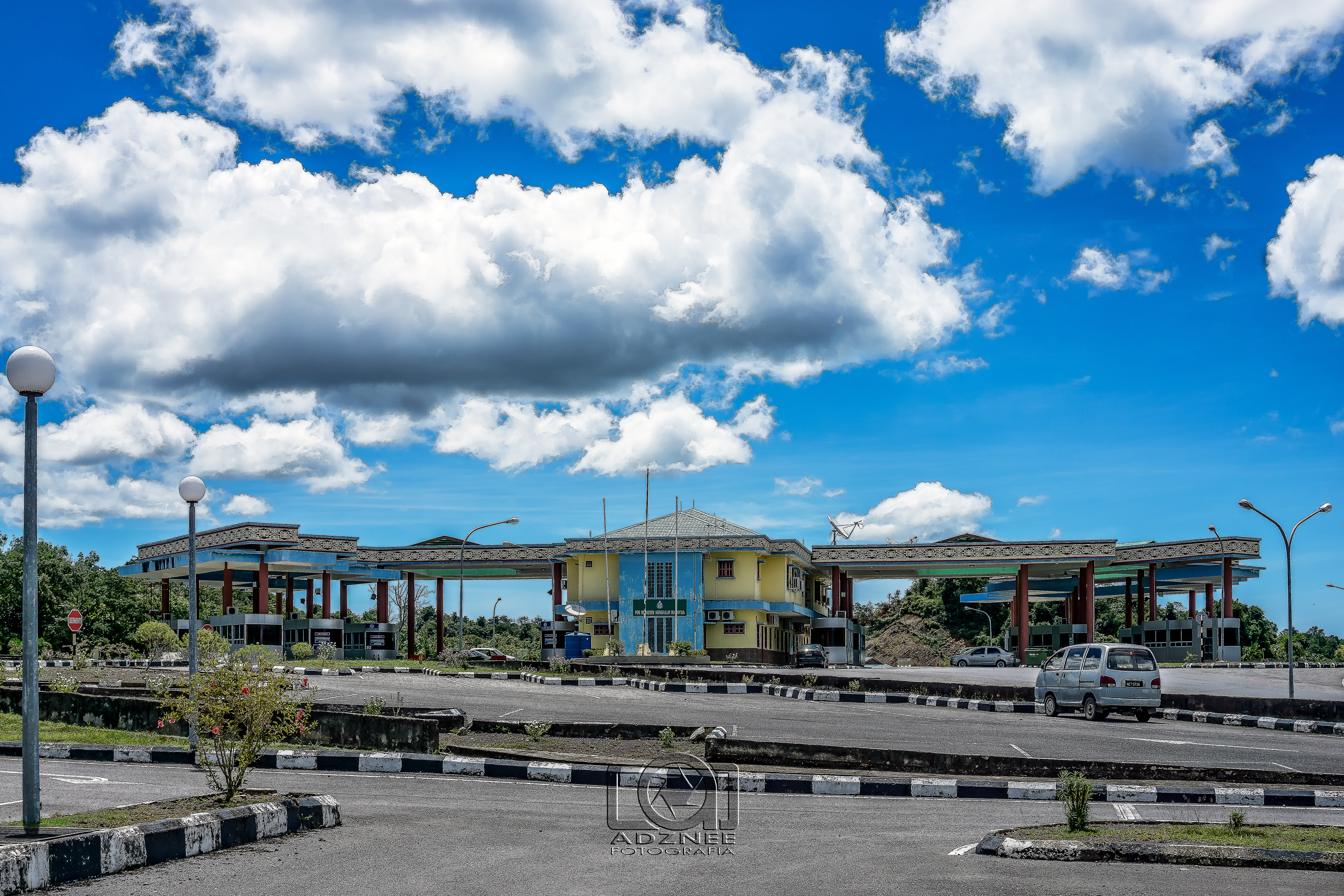
Malaysian immigration at Mengkalap checkpoint in Lawas

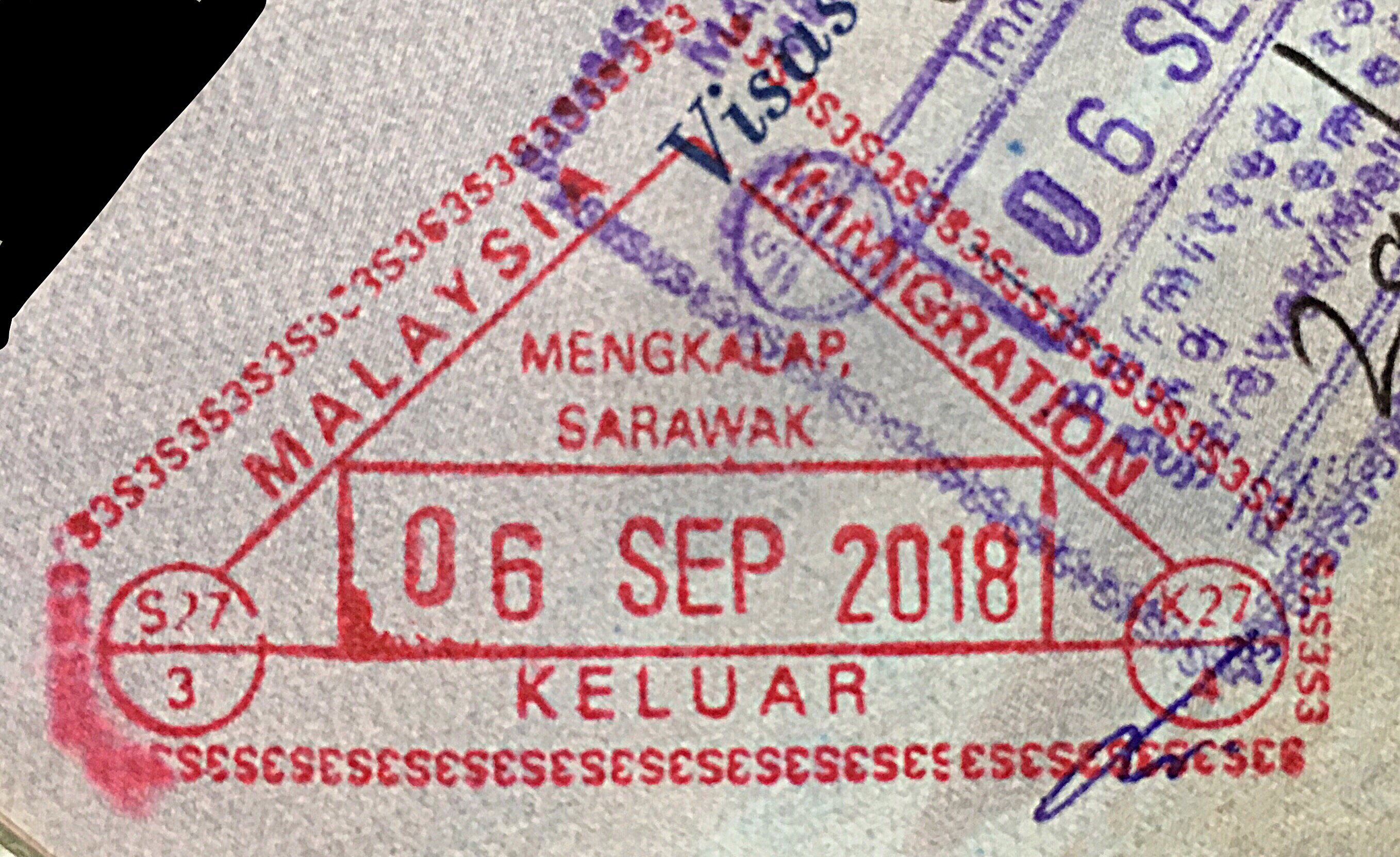
Exit stamp from Mengkalap ICQS Checkpoint.

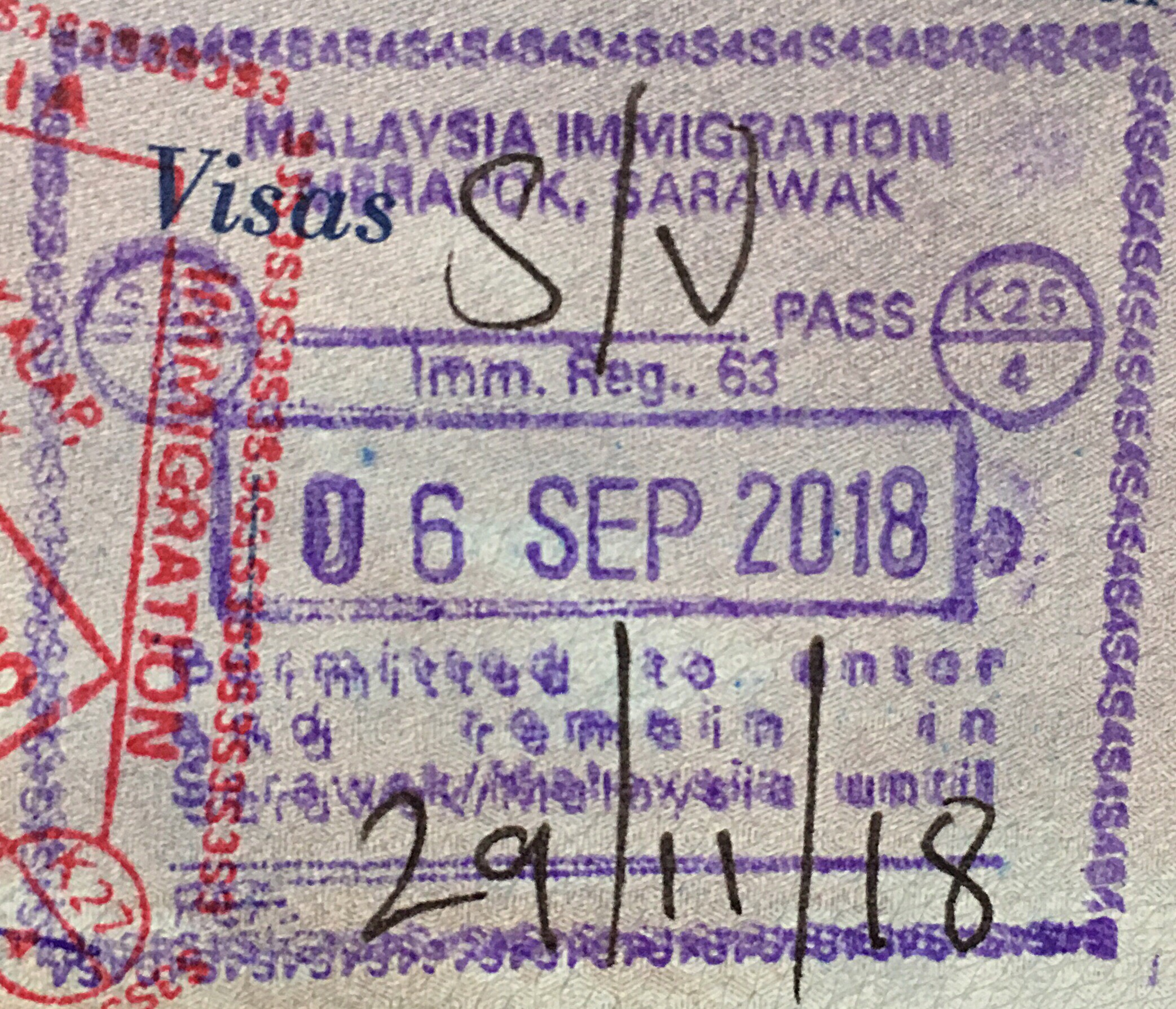
Entry stamp from Merapok ICQS Checkpoint.

=== Water transport ===
Another mode of transport is via the Lawas River. The cleaned river serves as an important link to neighbouring towns and deep interior settlements. Besides that, Lawas is also served by an airport. There has also been a plan to build a new airport. Commonly, four wheel drive would be the main transport for most of the highlanders.

Brunei, Labuan and Limbang can be reached by boat. The journey will take around two hours to get to the destination. Boats to Brunei, Labuan and Limbang are available at Lawas Wharf every morning. The boats can accommodate around 150 passengers.

=== Air transport ===
Lawas is served by Lawas Airport (IATA: LWY). It has flights to Miri, Ba' Kelalan and Kota Kinabalu, Sabah.

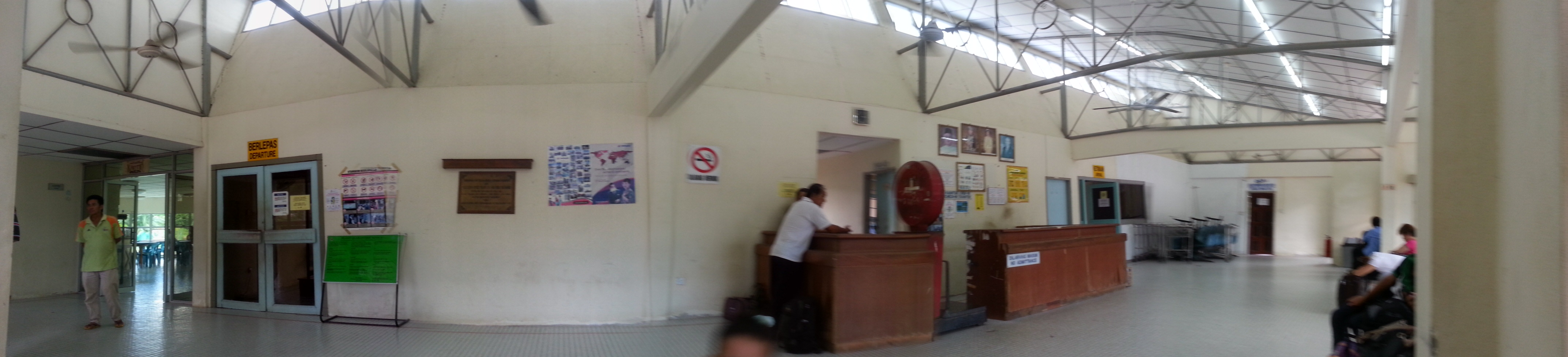
Interior of Lawas Airport

=== Public transport ===
There is a local bus network as well as buses linking Lawas with Kota Kinabalu (Sabah), Miri (Sarawak) and Brunei.

== Other utilities ==
=== Education ===
- SK Ulu Merapok
- SK Tang Lapadan
- SK Sundar
- SK Siang-Siang
- SK Pusat Lawas
- SK Puru Sia
- SK Punang
- SK Merapok
- SK Luagan
- SK Long Tuma
- SK Long Tukon
- SK Long Tengoa
- SK Long Sukang
- SK Long Semadoh
- SK Long Sebangan
- SK Long Luping
- SK Kuala Lawas
- SK Kerangan
- SK Kampung Seberang
- SK Kampung Lintang
- SK Belipat
- SK Batu Lima
- SK Ba Kelalan
- SK Awat-Awat
- SK Aru Baru
- SK Agama (Mis) Lawas
- SJK (C) Soon Hwa Sundar
- SJK (C) Chung Hwa Lawas
- SJK (C) Chung Hua Trusan
- SMK Lawas
- SMK Merapok
- SMK Sundar
- SMK Trusan
- Centre of Technical Excellence Sarawak (CENTEXS) Lawas Campus

Planned:

- MARA Junior Science College Lawas
- SMK Long Semadoh

Proposed:

- SMK Lawas 2
- Sekolah Berasrama Penuh Lawas

=== Healthcare ===
A government hospital was proposed to be built for the town under the Ninth Malaysia Plan. As of May 2016, the hospital is scheduled to be completed in 36 months.

== Culture and leisure ==
=== Lawas Mall ===
A planned RM210 million state government office complex cum three-storey shopping mall will be built next to Hotel Seri Malaysia and Lawas Town Square. The mall will houses a supermarket, departmental store and 132 commercial lots.

=== Pasar Tamu Lawas ===
The open-air market, locally known as tamu, is held weekly on from Friday evening until Saturday afternoon. Local produce such as fresh fruits, vegetables, fresh meat, Adan rice, Bario rice, ikan tahai, hill salts (Garam Bakelalan), handycraft traditional and live poultry are sold. The days of this weekly community occasion differ from district to district.

=== Lepapa Hypermarket ===
- 1.Bowling Centre
- 2.Service Apartment

=== Activities ===
- Pesta Lawas
- Lawas Regatta
- Irau Aco Lun Bawang Festival (Hari Gawai Dayak Harvest Festival)

=== Places of interest ===
One of the most popular tourist attractions in Lawas is its Tamu Lawas (or Lawas Produce Market), which is held every Saturday. Local products such as vegetables, fruits and sea products are sold by locals in this market which is frequented by locals and people from the neighbouring Temburong district of Brunei.

Besides Tamu Lawas, other interesting places in Lawas are Punang Beach, Sungai Bangat Beach, Pa' Lelau in Merarap, Mount Murud, Kampung air Terjun (along Jalan Trusan). Kuala Lawas, Punang and Awat Awat are famous with its Kampung Air. It is similar to Kampung Ayer in Brunei but smaller. The main mode of transportation is perahu (boat) to cross the river.

== Notable people ==
- YB Baru Bian from Lawas, the Ministry of Works (Malaysia) the representative for N81 Ba'kelalan (state constituency) and P214 Selangau (federal constituency).
- YB Dato’ Henry Sum Agong (P222 Lawas), the former Deputy Ministry of Domestic Trade, Cooperative and Consumerism of Malaysia.
- YB Mutang Tagal from Lawas, former member of Dewan Rakyat of the 6th and 7th Parliament of Malaysia, representing P154 Bukit Mas (federal constituency) and P177 Bukit Mas (federal constituency) respectively. He is currently the honorary consul of Romania in Sarawak.
- Balang Lasung from Long Semado, Sarawak, former national javelin thrower who had won 4 gold medals for Malaysia in 1977 Kuala Lumpur SEA Games, 1979 Jakarta SEA Games, 1981 Manila SEA Games and 1983 Singapore SEA Games.
