= Rajang River =

River in Sarawak, Malaysia

Coordinates: 2°07′47″N 111°13′09″E

Rajang Rejang, 拉让江
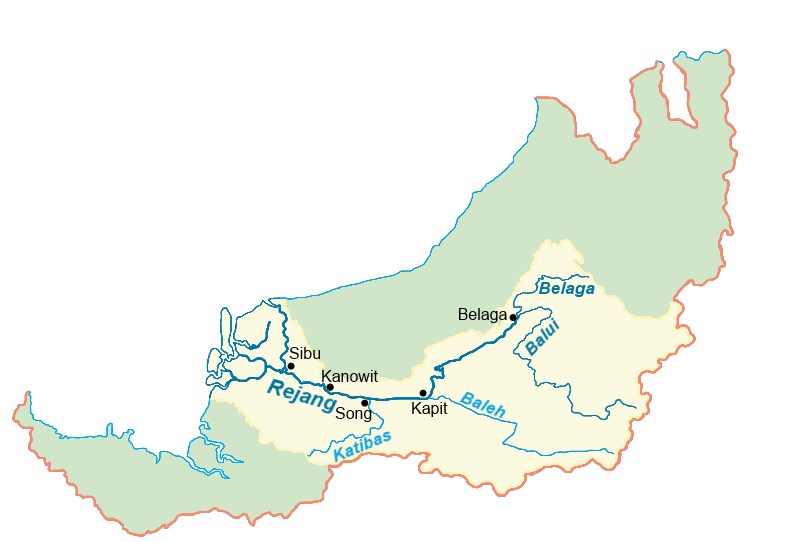
- The Rajang drainage basin
- Nickname: Swan river (Chinese community)

Location
- Country: Malaysia
- State: Sarawak

Physical characteristics
- Source: Iran Mountains
  - location: Malaysia
  - elevation: 2,074 m (6,804 ft)
- Mouth
  - location: South China Sea, Malaysia
  - elevation: 0 m (0 ft)
- Length: 770 km (480 mi)
- Basin size: 50,707 km^{2} (19,578 sq mi)
- Depth
  - minimum: 2
  - maximum: 45
- Discharge
  - location: Rajang Delta, South China Sea
  - average: 3,600 m^{3}/s (130,000 cu ft/s) (Period of data: 2003–2016); 4,715 m^{3}/s (166,500 cu ft/s) 124.826 km^{3}/a (3,955.5 m^{3}/s)
  - minimum: 1,000 m^{3}/s (35,000 cu ft/s)
  - maximum: 6,000 m^{3}/s (210,000 cu ft/s); 25,000 m^{3}/s (880,000 cu ft/s)
- Discharge
  - location: Kapit, Malaysia (Basin size: 34,053 km^{2} (13,148 sq mi))
  - average: (Period of data: 1983–1990); 2,510 m^{3}/s (89,000 cu ft/s)
  - minimum: 305 m^{3}/s (10,800 cu ft/s)
  - maximum: 10,799 m^{3}/s (381,400 cu ft/s)
- Discharge
  - location: Sibu, Malaysia (Basin size: 43,550.5 km^{2} (16,814.9 sq mi)
  - average: (Period of data: 1992–2016); 3,355 m^{3}/s (118,500 cu ft/s)

Basin features
- Tributaries
  - left: Belaga
  - right: Baleh, Balui, Katibas

The Rajang River (Malay: Sungai/Batang Rajang) is a river in Sarawak, northwestern Borneo, Malaysia. The river originates in the Iran Mountains, flows through Kapit, and then towards the South China Sea. At approximately 565 km long (351 mi), the river is the seventh-longest in Borneo and the longest and largest by volume in Malaysia.

Malaysia's largest and tallest (160 metres or 520 feet) hydro electric project, the Bakun Hydro Electric Dam, is located on the Balui River, a tributary of the Rajang. Other important tributaries include the Katibas River, Ngemah River, Iran River, Pila River, Balleh River, Bangkit River and the Kanowit River.

== Etymology ==
In Sarawakian Malay, a major river is named Batang (meaning "trunk" or "tree" in Malay) as it is the main larger stream which took its "root" from its tributary rivers which is known as Sungai ("river" in Sarawakian Malay) and branches out again at the delta, thus the Rajang River is known as Batang Rajang in Malay. (Note: Richard C, 2010. Page 3)

Upriver areas, such as the areas surrounding the headwaters, are called "Ulu" (which means "upriver") or "Hulu" in Malay. "Hulu Rajang" is the upriver section of the Rajang river. Places along the river that are too small to be called towns are named "Nanga" in the Iban language, which is the language used in the areas where the tributaries join the main river. Examples of Nangas are: Nanga Ngemah, Nanga Dap, and Nanga Poi. (Note: Richard C, 2010. Page 3) In Iban, "Nanga" means "longhouse" and is often followed by the name of the river that runs by it. There are certain communities that use "Rumah" (meaning "house" in Malay), often followed by the name of the headman (thus it can change in time). "Long", meaning "confluence", is used by the Orang Ulu (upriver people) to name places located at the confluence between the smaller tributaries and the major river, just as Malay uses the name "Kuala" (meaning "river delta").

Amongst the Chinese in Sibu, the Rajang River is also nicknamed the "Swan River" (鹅江), probably because of the legendary appearance of a flock of swans flying over the area, resulting in the end of a famine. Alternatively, it may originate with the Sibu Chinese immigrants regarding the Melanau people as "Go" people because their staple food was "Sago". "Go" is pronounced in a similar way to the Hokkien word for "Swan". Chinese immigrants may have been reminded of another "Swan River" back in China.

== Course ==
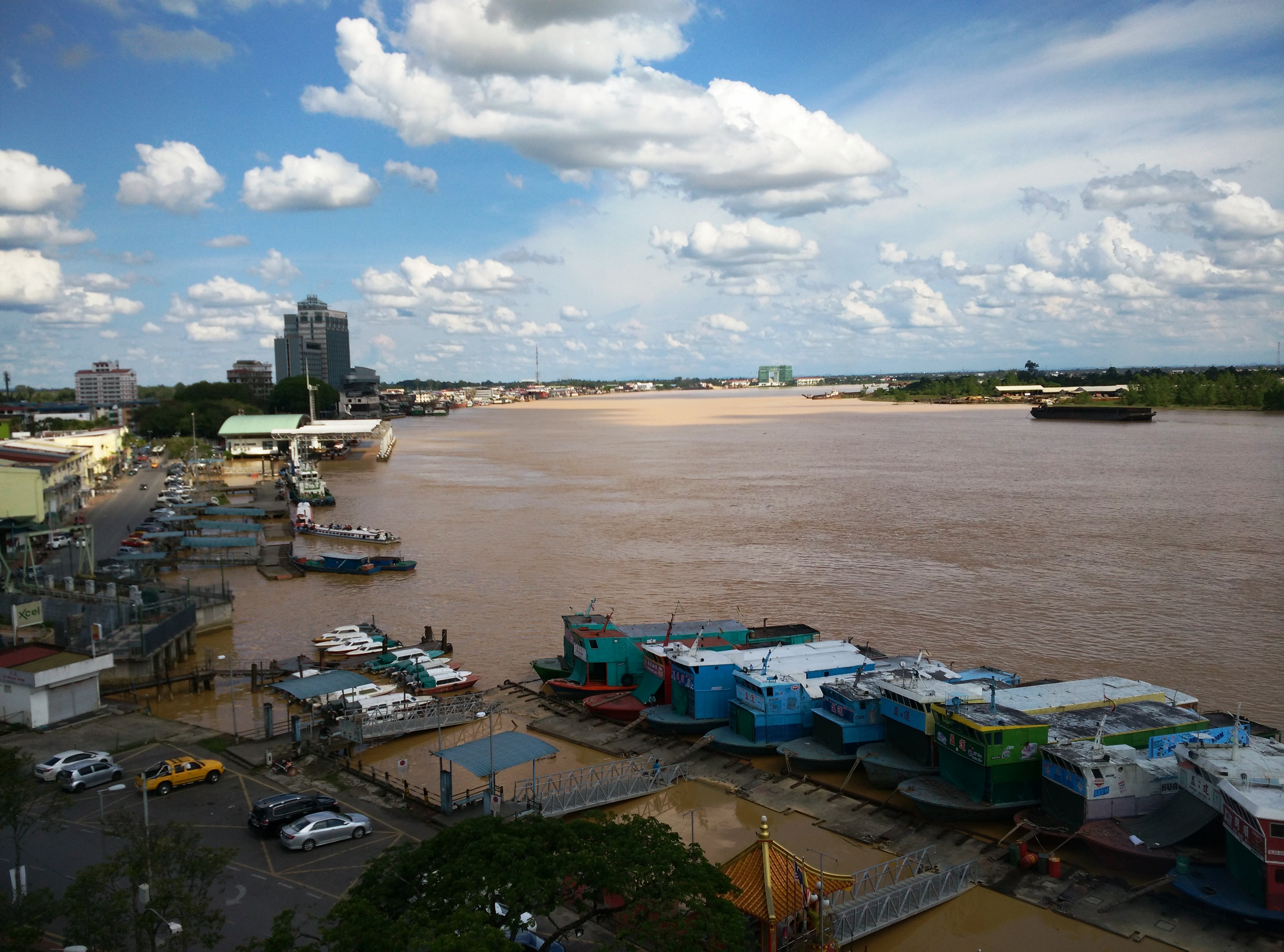
Sibu is located at 105 km from the river mouth

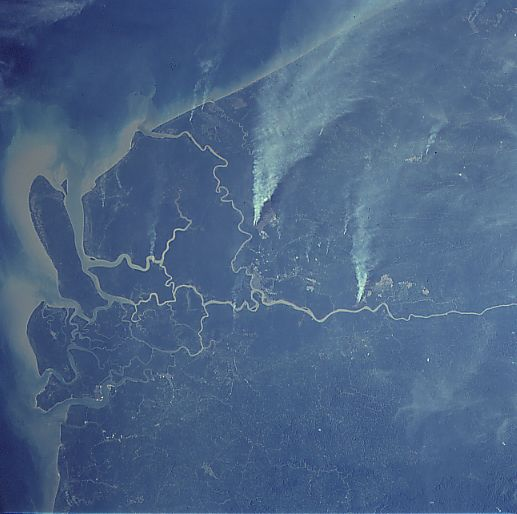
The elongated Bruit Island is located at the mouth of the Rajang River

The Rajang is the longest river system in Malaysia, with its source in the Nieuwenhuis mountains, where it forms the political boundary between Malaysia and Indonesia. There is more than 160 inches (4,100 mm; 13 ft) of rainfall each year in these mountains, which forms the headwaters of Rajang. The river flows from northeast to southwest. The Punan Bah people reside at the headwaters of the Rajang. One of the Rajang tributaries, the Balui River, north of the Hose Mountains, (Note: Hon Kah, 1996. Page 94) flows into the lands of the Kayan people and Kenyah people. At the western end of a great bend in the river is the Belaga District, and further downstream are the Pelagus Rapids where the Iban people dominate. (Note: Richard C, 2010. Page 1) The rapids are located 180 miles (290 km) from the Rajang river mouth. As the Balleh River (Note: Hon Kah, 1996. Page 94) joins the Balui river from south of the Hose Mountains, the Rajang becomes broader and deeper. It is estimated that about 25% of the people of Sarawak live in the region where the Rajang is at its broadest. (Note: Richard C, 2010. Page 2) At this intersection point, about 160 miles (260 km) from the river mouth, the river begins to flow from east to west, near the town of Kapit. Kapit is the last stop for express boats coming from Sibu, and is inhabited by the Chinese, Iban, and Kayan people. (Note: Richard C, 2010. Page 3) Kapit is the biggest town in the upper Rajang river. (Note: Hon Kah, 1996. Page 94)

Further downriver are smaller towns such as Song, which is located at the mouth of the Katibas River. At about 120 miles (190 km) from the sea, there are owned by both Chinese and Iban people. The lands are divided into parcels measuring several acres, where smallholders clear the land for agricultural activities. (Note: Richard C, 2010. Page 3) In the midst of these Mixed Zone Lands, 105 miles (169 km) miles from the sea, is the town of Kanowit; the river here is 0.5 miles (0.80 km) wide. (Note: Richard C, 2010. Page 5)

The biggest town on the banks of the river is Sibu, some 65 miles (105 km) upriver from the mouth of the Rajang. (Note: Hon Kah, 1996. Page 93) It can be reached by ocean-going vessels, and is the political, economic, cultural, and education centre of the central region of Sarawak. (Note: Richard C, 2010. Page 7) Other towns located further downriver are Sarikei (24 miles (39 km) from Rajang town) and Bintangor (11 miles (18 km) from Sarikei). (Note: Hon Kah, 1996. Page 93) These two towns have been mainly settled by the Chinese. Tanjung Manis District (16 miles (26 km) from the river's mouth) (Note: Hon Kah, 1996. Page 93) is located near the Rajang delta where the Malay and Melanau people dominate. (Note: Richard C, 2010. Page 8) Bruit Island is situated inside the Rajang delta, with a lighthouse at Sirik Point. The Rajang delta is bounded by the towns of Igan in the north and Rajang (4 miles (6.4 km) from the river's mouth) in the south. (Note: Hon Kah, 1996. Page 93)

== History ==
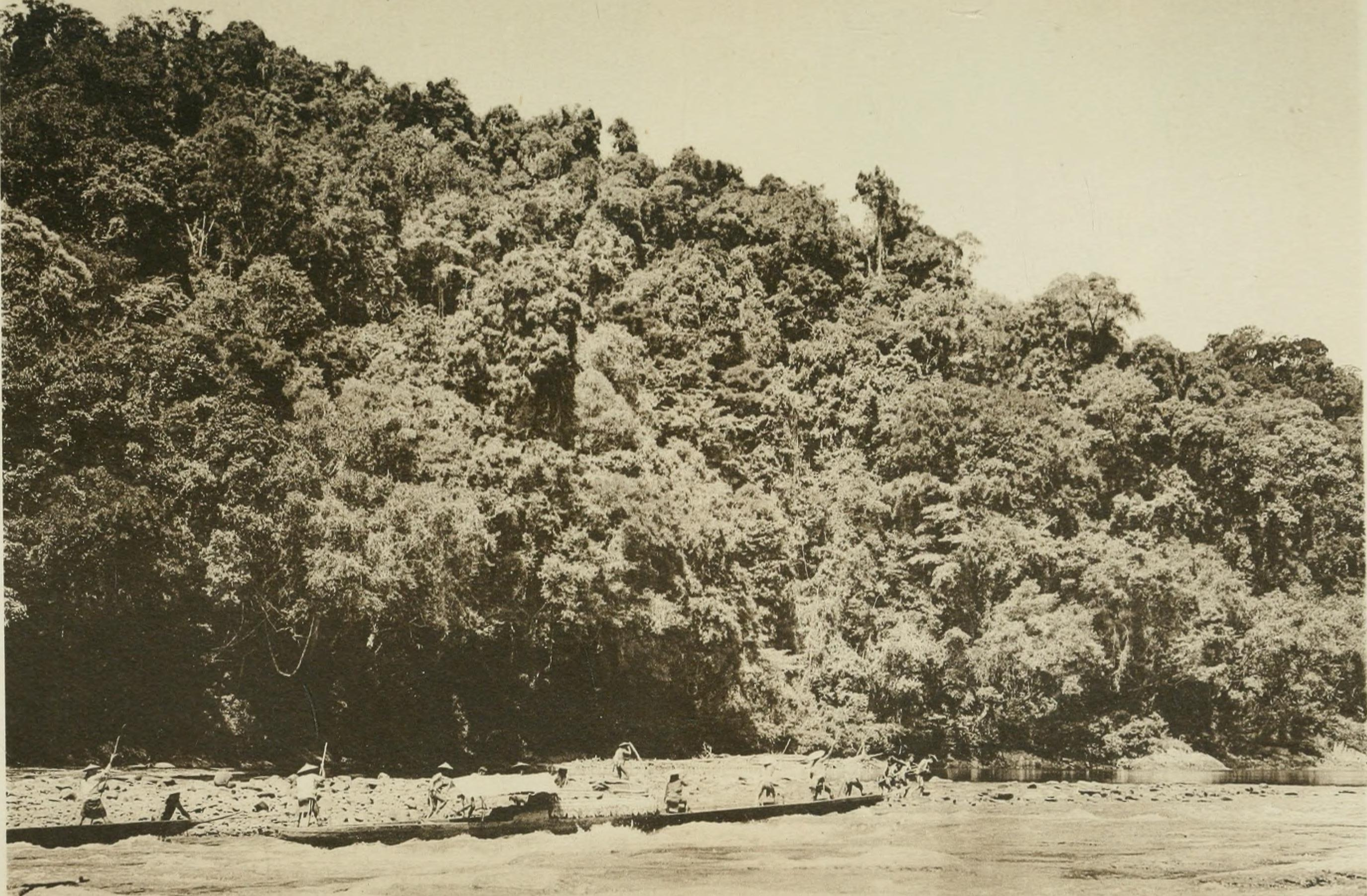
A group a natives row their longboat against water current in the river near Pelagus in 1912.

The population of the Rajang basin was very low in the 19th century during the Bruneian Empire. The people living along the river's banks traded with Malays from Brunei. At that time, the Melanau, Kanowit and Rajang ethnic groups lived downriver; Bhuket, Punan Bah, Lugat, Sihan and Kejaman ethnic groups lived at the middle section of the river, with Penan and Seping tribes living in the upriver area. After the 19th century, the Kayan and Kenyah migrated to the Balui river from the present day Indonesian Kalimantan. Meanwhile, the Iban people migrated from West Kalimantan to the lower Rajang valley, moving their agricultural base. Inter-ethnic conflicts followed the introduction of new tribes into the Rajang basin, and some ethnic groups fled to the Balingian and Tatau rivers.

In the late 19th century, the government of Charles Brooke began constructing forts along the Rajang in an attempt to achieve political stability in the Rajang basin. The Chinese then started to move inland and settle near the forts and trade various forest products with the natives. In 1884, Fort Vyner was constructed, and Belaga soon became the political and economic centre of the district. Subsequently, government offices, schools, a bank, a police station, a mosque, and churches were built around the fort.

During the Brooke era, the sago processing industry was an important economic activity amongst the Melanaus, and it provided an important revenue for the Sarawak government. The sago products were sent to the port of Sibu for export overseas. The Ibans in the Rajang basin exchanged jungle produce with Chinese and Malay businessmen for salt, beads, metal, porcelain utensils, earthen jars, and coins. Seeing the success of Chinese planting rubber trees and pepper vines, the Ibans also started to grow these cash crops. Later, when the Chinese ventured into the logging industry, urban migration of the Ibans occurred, whilst the Kayans and Kenyahs grew rice, cash crops such as rubber, coffee, and groundnuts. The Penans and Punans maintained a nomadic way of life, bringing jungle produce, woven items, and handicrafts for sale at local markets. (Note: Hon Kah, 1996. Page 191-195)

On 25 March 1973, during the period of the Communist insurgency, the Sarawak government set up the "Rajang Special Security Area", and Rajang Security Command (RASCOM) was formed as a result of co-operation of civil, military, and police command headquarters, to clamp down on communist activities in the Rajang delta. Construction of the Bakun Dam on the upper Balui River, from 1997, resulted in the Sungai Asap resettlement scheme.

== Wildlife ==
=== Mammals ===
Thirty species of mammals were recorded along the Rajang basin by a study of 2004. The mouth of the river is the only place where the dolphins can be sighted. Totally protected mammals include gibbon, langurs, black giant squirrel, slow loris, and tarsier. Civets, otters, bats, treeshrew, and primates are also included under the Sarawak Wildlife Protection Ordinance 1998. Wild pigs and deer are the animals most frequently hunted by the locals.

=== Birds ===
A total of 122 species of bird was recorded by the 2004 study, with 21 species along the mouth of the river, 96 species in the Hose Mountains, and 88 species at Lanjak Entimau in the interior of Sarawak. The only endemic species of bird found in the Rajang basin was the Dusky munia, found abundantly in paddy fields. Other species of bird commonly found along the Rajang basin are the Pacific swallow, Little spiderhunter, and Asian glossy starling. Twenty species of birds (mainly eagles, egret, kingfishers, woodpeckers) are protected, while seven species of birds (mainly hornbill and pheasant) are totally protected under the Sarawak Wildlife Protection Ordinance 1998.

=== Fish ===
A total of 164 fish species was recorded at the Rajang basin in 2005. Empurau (Tor tambroides) and Semah (Tor douronensis) fish are considered popular fishes among the locals. the Empurau is still found breeding near the upper tributaries of Rajang such as the Balleh River, and also near the Bakun Dam.

== Economy ==
The major economic activity in the upper reaches of the Rajang River is logging. Among the types of wood that are extracted for exports are Ramin, plywood, Kapur, Meranti, Keruing, and Belian. Rice is the dominant crop along the middle section of the Rajang basin. Trading of Engkabang fruits ("illipe nuts") were commonly traded in the 1960s and 1970s, with the trade centred on Sibu. The fruits are also a food for fish such as empurau that populate the river. Other agricultural activities in the Rajang basin include the cultivation of rubber, pepper and vegetables, and poultry domestication. (Note: Richard C, 2010. Page 13-15)

=== Trade ===
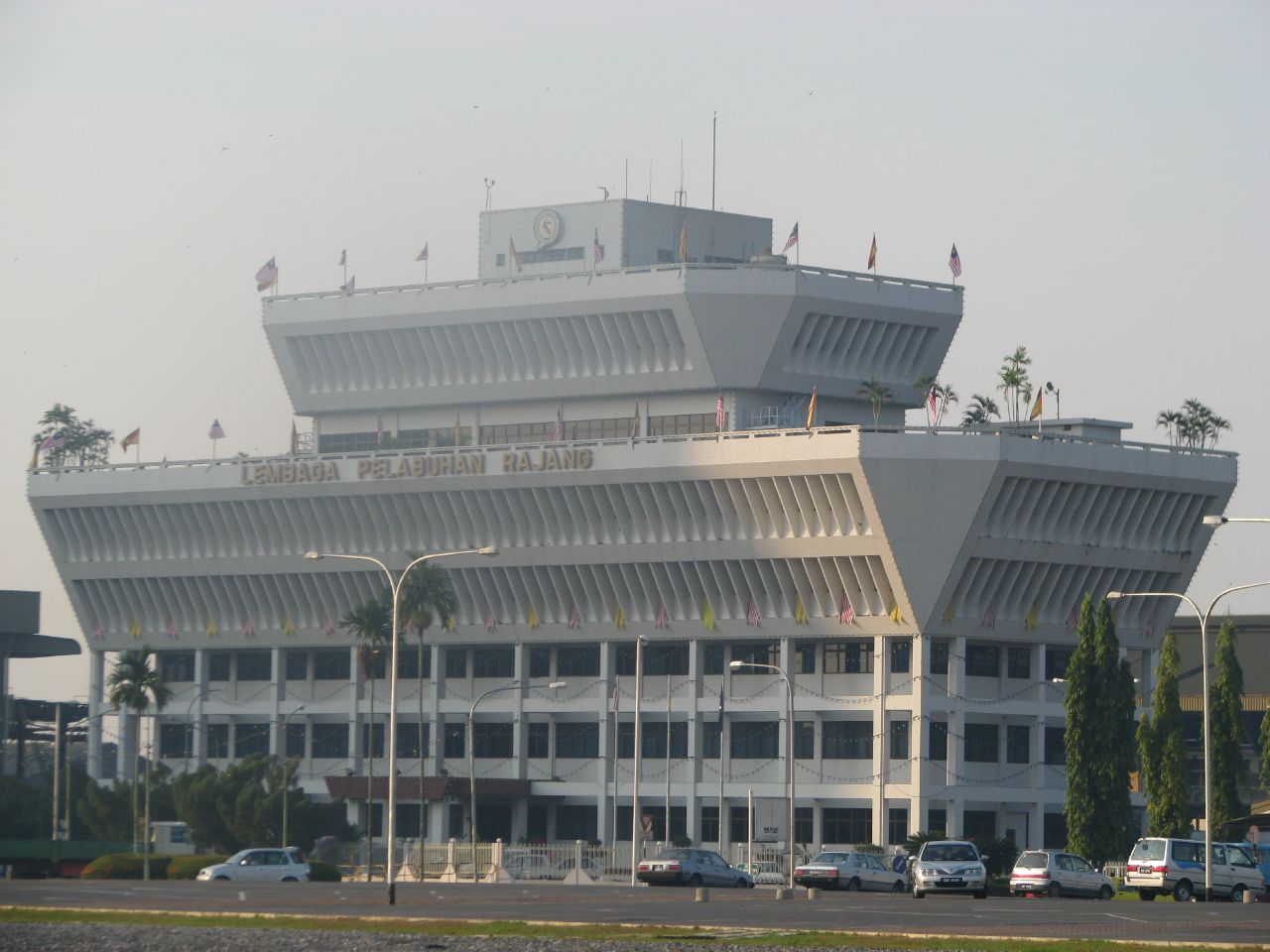
The Rajang Port Authority in Sibu

The Rajang Port Authority (RPA) is the main regulatory body for coordinating the trade activities of all five river ports along the Rajang River. RPA serves to provide maintenance, adequate and efficient port services for all users of the ports. It is located at the Sibu port operation centre Sibu and Sungai Merah can be assessed via a shorter route through the Paloh river where the distances from the mouth of the river can be shortened to 82 km and 92 km respectively. In 2012, RPA recorded a total revenue of RM 30.1 million although its total cargo throughput went down from 5.0 million to 3.2 million tonnes from the previous year. The five river ports along the Rajang river (arranged by their distances from the river mouth) are:

- Tanjung Manis (30 km, maximum Gross tonnage (GT): 32,000, mainly for handling logs and timber products)
- Sarikei (49 km, maximum GT: 3,000, mainly for handling agricultural products and consumer goods around Sarikei area)
- Bintangor (66 km, maximum GT: 2,500)
- Sibu (113 km, maximum GT: 10,000, mainly for handling timber and agricultural products)
- Sungai Merah (Near Sibu, 116 km, maximum GT: 2,500, mainly for handling fuel oil products)

=== Tourism ===
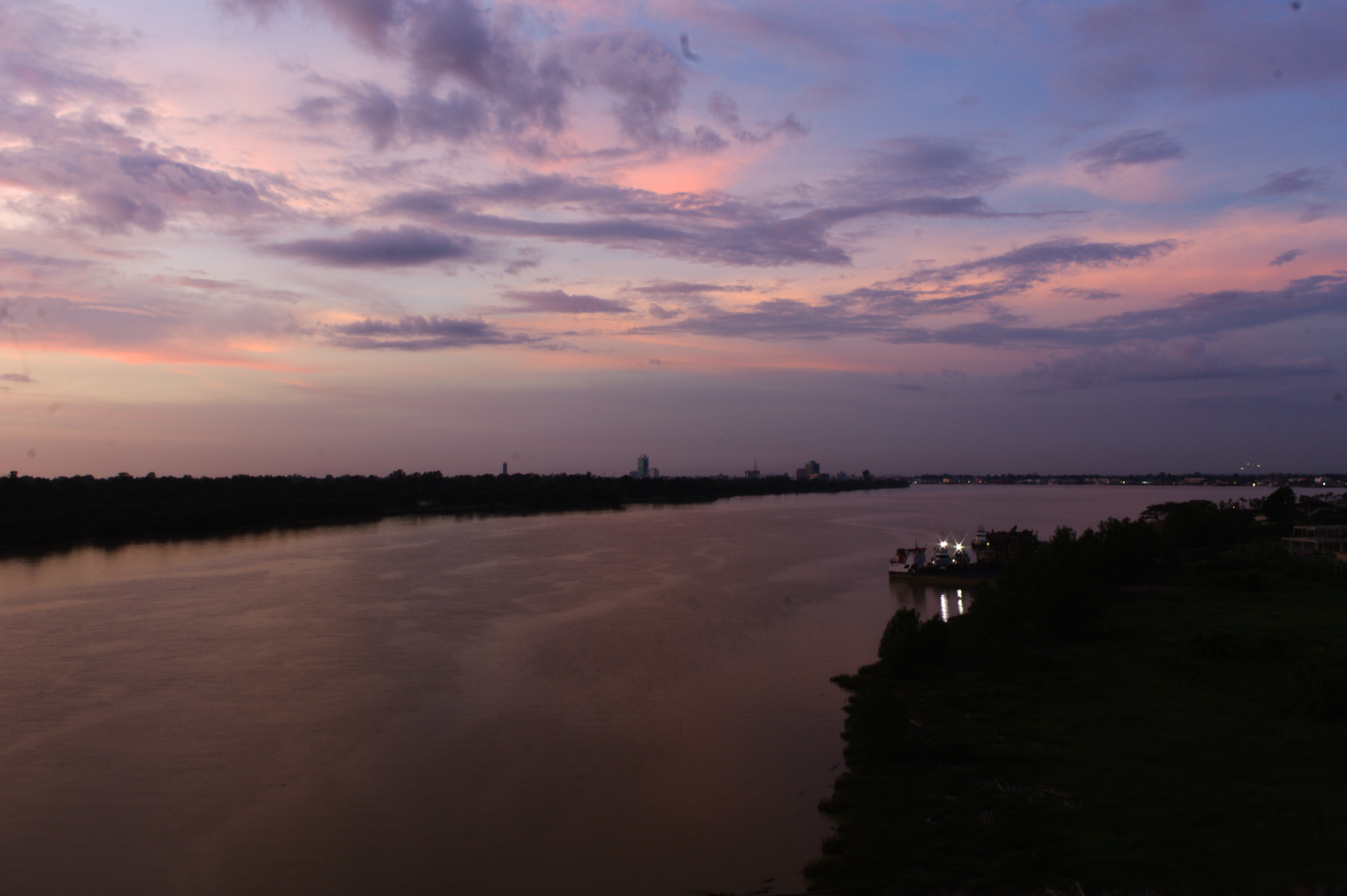
View of the Rajang river during sunset on the Lanang bridge in Sibu

River cruises for tourists were run on the Rajang between Sibu and the Pelagus Rapids Resort in Kapit from 2009 until 2012, but were terminated because of logistical and operational difficulties. During 2017's "Visit Sibu Year", longhouse visits along the Rajang River were promoted as an ecotourism project. Crocodiles, which live by the river banks, became the mascot for the event.

== Transportation ==
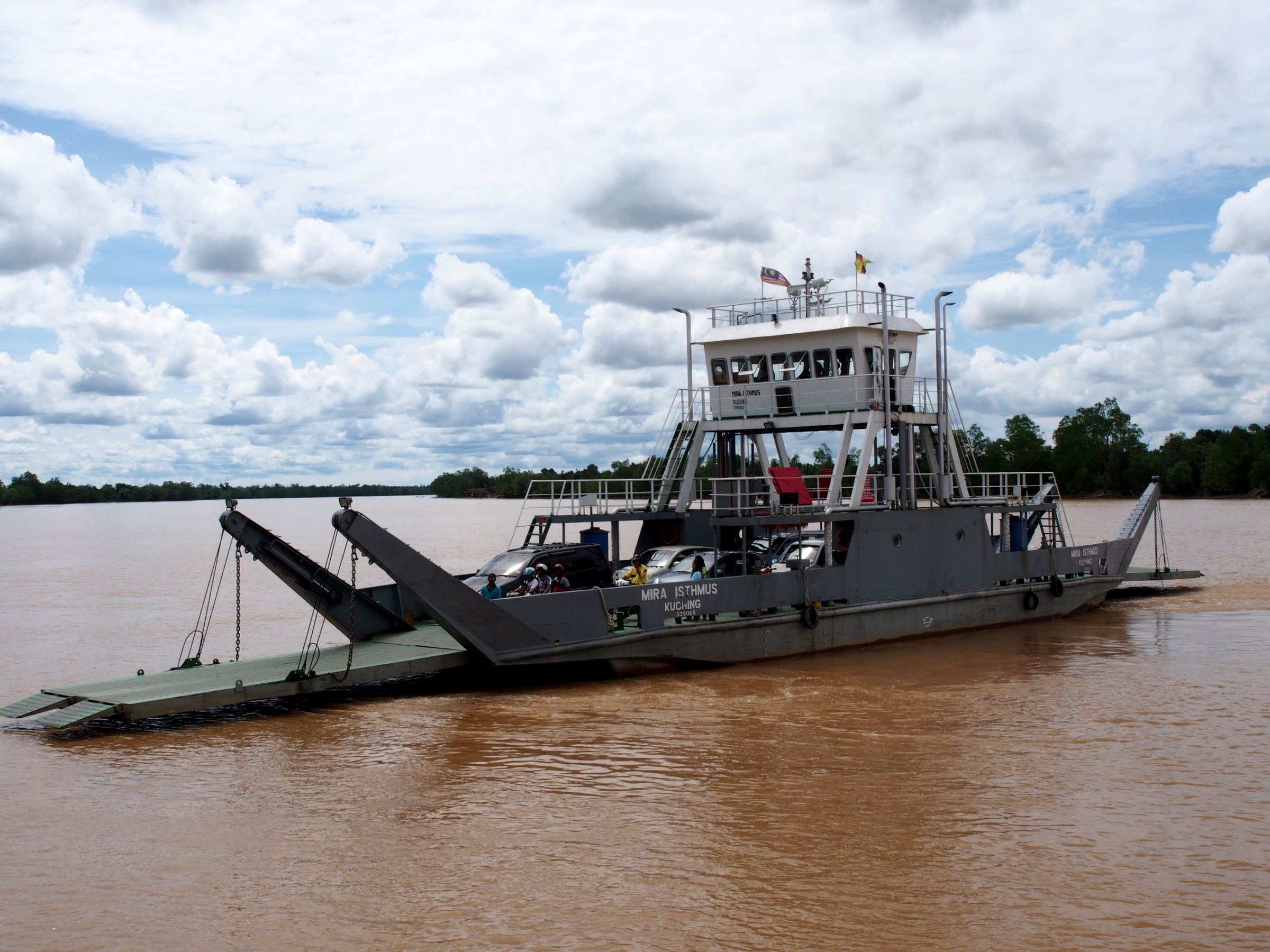
Ferry crossing the Rajang River in Bintangor.

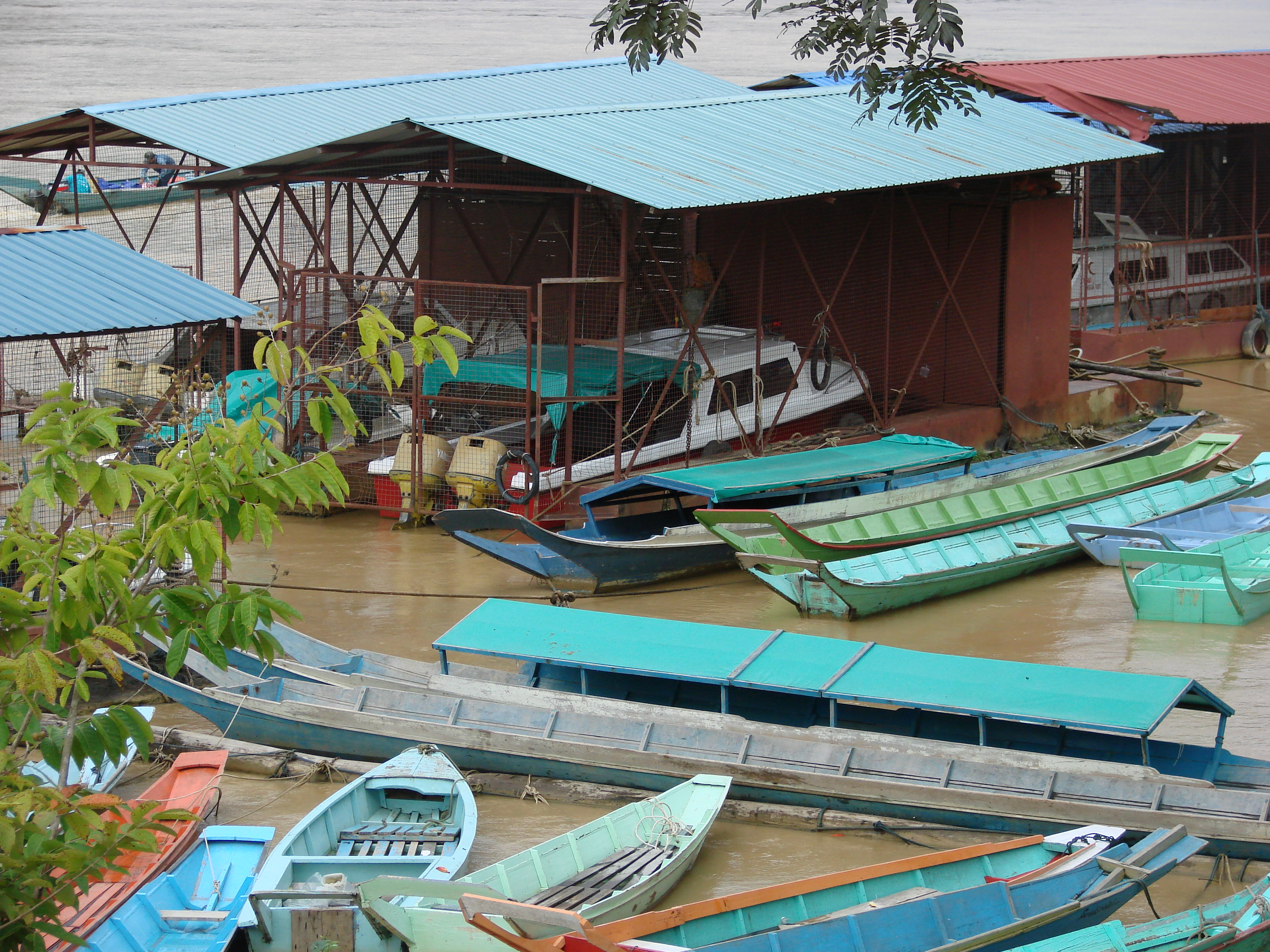
Speedboats and longboats are common at Kapit wharf terminal.

The town of Sibu can be assessed by oceangoing vessels for 80 miles (130 km), while an additional 100 miles (160 km) of the river can be assessed by shallow-draft craft. The remaining parts of the river, leading into the Sarawak interior, can only be assessed by small canoes. Speedboats and longboats are the major form of transport between Kapit and Belaga. Transportation above Belaga to the Balui River requires longboats. The Rajang River is also used for transporting logs. During the monsoon season, some areas of the interior are accessible only by river. Meanwhile, in the towns downriver, market traders are often affected by floods. (Note: Richard C, 2010. Page 9)

== Water quality ==
Logging operations are rampant on the upstream of the Rajang river. A major study conducted along the Rajang river from May to December 2004 found that the main channel of the Rajang river was turbid except for smaller tributaries. The water transparency was about 4 cm to 5 cm at that time. Based on Taxonomic richness index, the stretch of upstream river between Kanowit and Belaga river is recovering from logging 15 to 20 years ago with the exception of Penaan river because the local community uses toxic chemicals to capture fish. The stretch of river downstream from Lebaan to Selalang river is considered unclean.

== Floods ==
Floods in the Rajang delta near the coast are usually caused by the rising tide while floods 120 km inland near Sibu is caused by heavy downpour with inadequate drainage caused by sediment accumulation in the river bed; as a result of heavy development of the river upstream.

In September 2020, heavy rain in the upper tributaries of the Rajang caused flash floods in the low-lying areas of Kapit, Song, Kanowit and Sibu.

== Logjams ==
On 6 October 2010, heavy rain have caused a massive landslide that brought logs and debris down into the Balleh river, tributaries above Kapit, and then into the Rajang river. It was estimated that the volume of the logs and debris had exceeded 300,000m in length. The logjam also affected the Igan river. The log debris, stretching 50 km, reached Sibu on 8 October, causing transportation difficulties for the people living alongside the river and killed many fish. On 2 November 2012, Global Witness claimed that the logging operations of Interglobal Empire, a subsidiary of the WTK group of companies, owners of the logging concession T/3476, were responsible for the landslide into the Melatai River which subsequently blocked the Rajang River.

Similar logjam occurred in early 2017 at the upper reaches of the Balui.

In August 2021, logjam blocked the Rejang River, shutting down the water treatment plants in Sibu.

In March 2024, logjam happened near the town of Song, Kapit Division.

== In the media ==
The Rajang river became the subject matter in 1993 documentary film, Ekspedisi Rejang (The Rejang Expedition), produced by Filem Negara Malaysia.

== See also ==
- List of rivers of Malaysia
