= Punan Sama =

Village in Sarawak, Malaysia

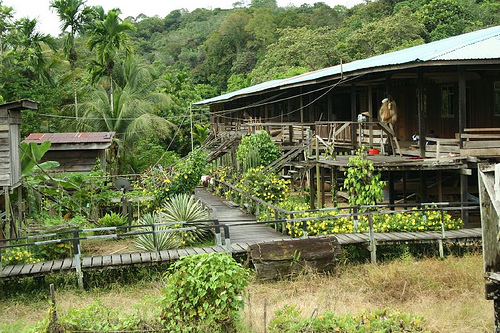
Punan Sama longhouse, Belaga, Sarawak.

Punan Sama is a small village (longhouse) situated along the Rajang River in Sarawak, Malaysia. The longhouse's previous name was "Lovuk Tepeleang". The majority of those inhabiting the longhouse are Punan, with a few Sekapan, Kejaman and Lahanan, as a result of inter marriage.

Punan Sama (lovuk Tepeleang) Chiefs (Bold):

- Bejeang + Beneang (Melanau)
- Nyaleang + Inan Jiu (Kenyah Seping)
- Jiu + Telen (Kayan)
- Lanying + Lahey (Sekapan)
- Kulleh Imang (a Lahanan) + Bawe (a punan)

== History ==
Punan Sama (or Lovuk Tepeleang) came into existence through fission of ancient Punan longhouse Kavu Oka. Kavu Oka's elder son, Salui, continued to rule the stem-house, while a younger son, Bejeang, split off with section of the longhouse to form a separate community. Bejeang then move the longhouse across Rajang river, about a few kilometer away from the current Punan Bah longhouse to a place known as ungei Susou or Susou river. Then they move further up the Rajang river to the Meah-Rejang junction. They remain at Meah river for quite a long time; there are kelirieng (a burial pole) erected here for the aristocrats and distinguished persons in the longhouse.

Under Jiui's rule the Punan Tepeleang made their way further up the Rajang river, making their longhouse at ungei Keruang, ungei Pii, ungei Bua' and ungei Bo'on. The longhouse at Bo'on mark the start of the rivalry between the encroaching Ibans and Punan to along the Rajang river. Unable to contend Iban encroachment the Punan Tepeleang then moving further up Rajang river closer to the present Kayan longhouse below Bungan rapid. Their empty longhouse at Boon was later burnt down by the encroaching Ibans.

== Location ==
Where located? Punan Sama longhouse is located about two hours express boat (river transportation) from Kapit, the administrative town of 7th Division. During low water level - the Rajang river is almost impassable by express boat or other bigger river transportation. As such Punan Sama longhouse is only accessible via trunk road build by logging companies from Tatau or Bintulu.
