= Fort Sylvia =

Historic fortification in Malaysia

Coordinates: 2°1′2″N 112°56′31″E

The Fort Sylvia (Malay: Kubu Sylvia) is a historical fort in Kapit, Sarawak, Malaysia. Built in 1880, it was renamed after Rani Sylvia Brooke, wife of Rajah Charles Vyner Brooke, in 1925. During the 1960s, the fort housed the District Office and the District Court House, and later the Resident's Office when Kapit Division was formed in 1973.

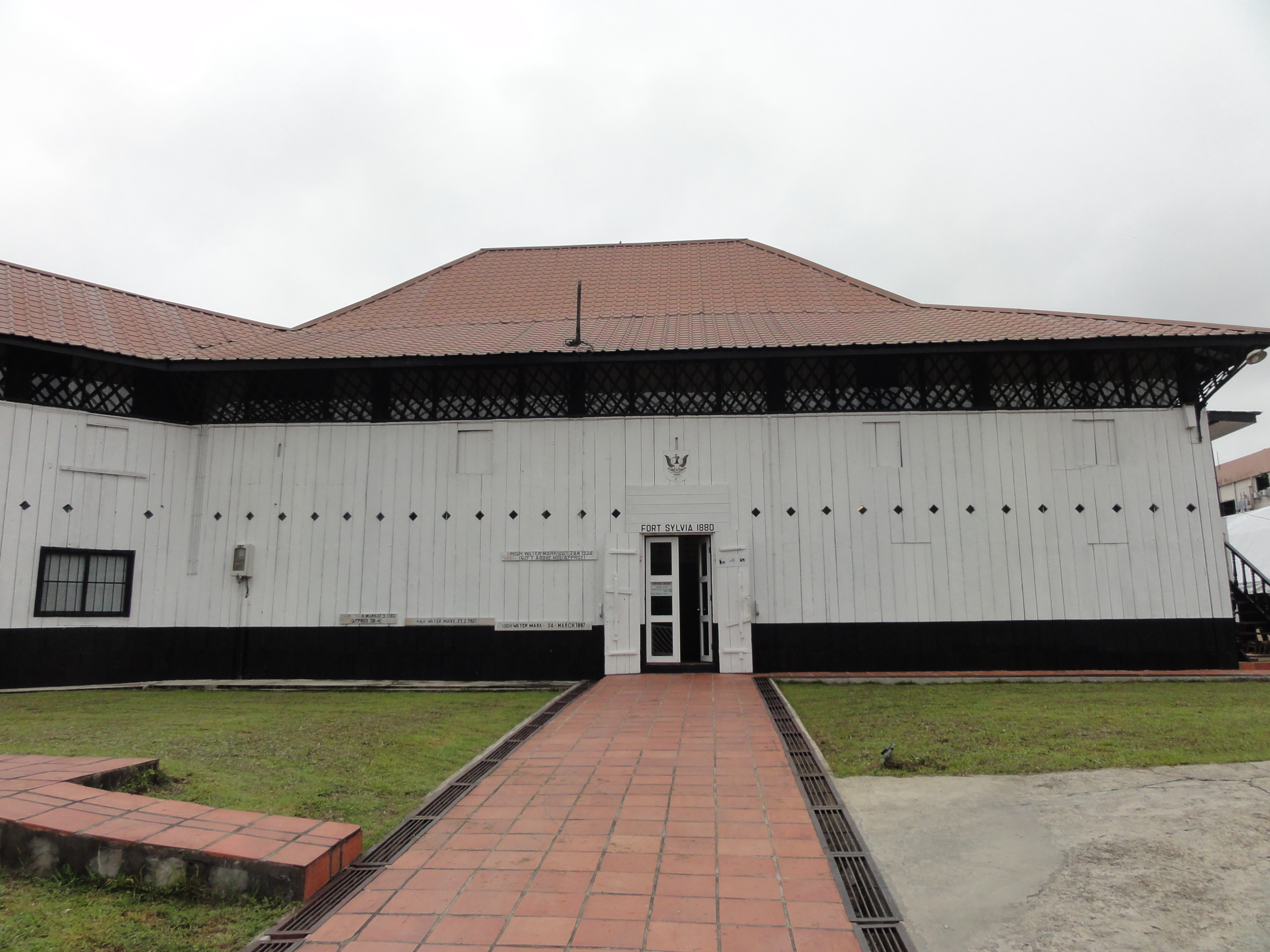
Fort Sylvia

In May 1997, the Sarawak state government gave approval for the monument to be managed by the Tun Jugah Foundation and to set up a museum within the fort itself. The Tun Jugah Foundation was given the responsibility of conservation and renovation works, which commenced immediately and was completed by December 1998.

== History ==
To prevent further Iban migration upriver in the Rajang River basin, which was creating conflicts with the Orang Ulu, Rajah Charles Brooke built Baleh Fort at Nanga Balleh, the confluence of the Rejang and Baleh rivers between Kanowit and Song in late 1874. Rajah Charles Brooke nearly drowned here in 1877 when his boat capsized in the dangerous currents. He abandoned the fort in 1878, and replaced it with a new fort located lower down the river in 1880. The new Kapit Fort was built entirely of ‘belian’ (ironwood) timber with thick walls to withstand attacks.

On 16 November 1924, a peacekeeping ceremony between the Iban, Kayan, Kenyah and Kajang was held here in the presence of Rajah Charles Brooke. In 1925, Kapit Fort was renamed Fort Sylvia after Rani Sylvia Brooke. During the 1960s, the fort housed the District Office and the District Court House, and later the Resident's Office when Kapit Division was formed in 1973.

== Museum ==
The Tun Jugah Foundation converted Fort Sylvia into a museum and fountain of history in Kapit town. It consists of many sections listed as below.

=== History ===
This section depicts the history of Kapit, history of Fort Sylvia, and the colonial days. The exhibits include photographs and copies of documents relating to the section. Some of the photographs on display are the 1924 Peace-Making ceremony; a group photograph of Sir Charles Vyner Brooke together with Ranee Sylvia Brooke, Temenggong Koh and Tedong ak Barieng; a photograph of Domingo de Rozario; a group photograph taken outside Fort Sylvia; and a photograph of Temenggong Koh, Malcolm MacDonald and TunJugah anak Barieng.

=== Community Wall of Fame ===
It is a display of the photographs of community leaders or famous historical figures of various community groups including Iban, Orang Ulu, Malays and Chinese. Among the Iban leaders are Tun Jugah anak Barieng, Temenggong Koh ak Jubang, Temenggong Sibat ak Buyong, and Temenggong Jinggut ak Attan. Among the Chinese community are Kapitan Ah Wai, Tan Guan Hock and Tan Sit Leong. Among the Orang Ulu are Penghulu Hang Nyipa, Penghulu Puso Abun and Matu Puso. Malay leaders include Radin Yusop bin Radin Salleh. Datuk Abang Abdul Gapor bin Abang Tek, Datu Abang Ahmad bin Datu Abang Abdul Gapor, and Datuk Abang Indih bin Datu Abang Gapor.

=== Tun Jugah Gallery ===
This gallery displays photographs and mementos of the late Tun Jugah anak Barieng. Among the mementos are uniforms, medals, sword, and other personal possessions of the late Tun Jugah. To complement the gallery, there are other exhibits like plates and ceramics, jars, and canons. A bronze bust of Tun Jugah is also displayed on the first floor.

=== Iban Costumes and Textiles ===
A selection of pua’ kumbu’ pieces, in silk and cotton are on display here. Among the pieces is a silk piece entitled `Kara’ jangkit’ woven by an accomplished weaver, Gading ak Mayau from Sungai Kain, Kapit. Iban costumes are also on display here.

=== Mural Painting of the Iban World ===
The largest exhibit in the museum is a mural painting, depicting the Iban way of life.

=== Hall of Fame ===
To show the past contributions of the community and other people who has served and are still serving in Kapit Division, the museum has put up four pieces of brass plaques listing the names of District Officers, Residents, Community leaders, Penghulus, Sarawak Rangers, First Malaysia Rangers, other Regiments, and Iban Trackers.

=== Amber Gallery ===
Located at the ground floor of the building, the gallery is a joint effort between the Tun Jugah Foundation and the Geological Survey Department in Kuching. The exhibits consist of raw Sarawak amber, polished Sarawak amber, and amber carvings. The raw amber is supplied by Global Minerals Sdn. Bhd., obtained from the Merit Pila Coal mine near Kapit and were selected by the Geological Survey group.

The polished amber pieces were done by Mr. James Loh, from the Geological Survey department. The amber carvings were done by Mr. Kojan Kabeng, a local carver and artist from Punan Bah. One of the world's largest amber deposits was discovered recently in the Merit-Pila Coal Field along the Batang Rejang. The largest piece of amber in the world was found here. The amber is derived from fossilised resin. Based on geological evidence, the age of the amber is estimated to be Miocene (approximately 20 million years old).

Many fossilised insects were observed in Sarawak amber, trapped approximately 20 million years ago when the resin was initially accumulated and perfectly preserved to this day. So far, the insects found in amber were spiders, ants, mosquitoes, centipedes, wasps and beetles. The colours of amber vary from black to whitish and sometimes with shades of orange, red, yellow and brown. They can be either opaque or transparent.

=== Weaving / Handicraft Workshop ===
One of the objectives of the Tun Jugah Foundation is to preserve and promote the development of the indigenous ikat weaving of the Iban. Right behind the Reception on the Ground Floor is the ruai where there are exhibits on Iban weaving. On display are weaving tools and implements; and raw materials for making pua kumbu.

Opportunities are given to organisations like Sarakup Indu Dayak Sarawak in Kapit who wish to conduct weaving workshops, exhibitions and competitions. A number of weavers from Kapit are affiliated to the Tun Jugah Foundation. They are Gading ak Mayau, Bidah ak Unjong, Tegok ak Sabut and Anchang ak Tun Jugah. Puan Siah ak Tun Jugah is a consultant at the Tun Jugah Foundation on adat and rites relating to pua.

Another corner is allocated for those who wish to conduct other handicraft workshops like bead-work, basketry and carving.

=== Other Rooms ===
There is a Conference Room located on the ground floor which can accommodate about 30 people to conduct scholarly discourse on arts and culture.

On the first floor, there is an adjoining Discussion and Function Room, which can by used for receiving important officials and academics, and at the same time provide a venue for discussion and meetings.

The Ranee Suite is used as a venue for recording of oral research. One of the objectives of the Tun Jugah Foundation is to collect, transcribe and publish Iban oral literature.

There is also a Reader's Corner located at the first floor where a collection of books on the Brookes, Sarawak history, crafts, books written in Iban, oral literature and other publications are provided as reading materials. Among these are books published by the Tun Jugah Foundation. Most of the foundation's forthcoming publications are also available for readers once they are printed.

== See also ==
- List of Forts constructed during the Raj of Sarawak
