= Song, Malaysia =

Song
- Town and district capital

Chinese transcription(s)
  - Simplified: 桑
- Location in Sarawak Song (Malaysia)
- Coordinates: 2°01′N 112°33′E
- Country: Malaysia
- State: Sarawak
- Division: Kapit
- District: Song

Population
  - Estimate (2010): 20,046 (District)
- Time zone: UTC+8 (MST)
  - Summer (DST): UTC+8 (Not observed)
- Postal code: 96850
- Website: www.kapit.sarawak.gov.my

Map of Song District

Song (Malay: Pekan Song) is a town, and the capital of the Song District (3,935.2 square kilometers) in Kapit Division, Sarawak, Malaysia. The district's population was 20,046 according to the 2010 census. Song is situated by the banks of the Katibas River, a tributary of the Rajang River. It is an important stopover for river traffic going up the Rajang River.

== Etymology ==
The district was originally named by the Kayan people as long which means river stream. After the Kayan people were defeated by the Iban people, the Ibans renamed the place after an Iban warrior named Song who led them to victory against the Kayans. Another version of the origin of the name Song came from the legend of the Melanau people. There was once a Melanau widow named Song who came from Nangka village, Sibu. She went to the present day Song river mouth for agriculture. Her relatives would frequently visit her. When they ask her which place she would like to go, she would said "to Rumah Song " (her own home). Thus the area is called Song.

== History ==
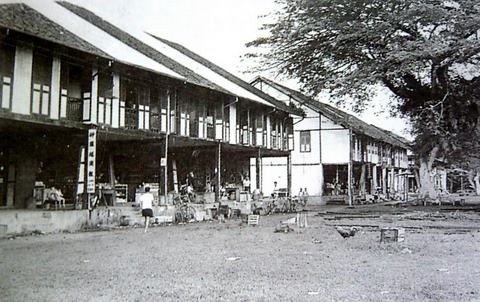
Song Sarawak (Borneo) in 1960s

The Kayan people were the first group that inhabited the Song District. At that time, the Kayans were a nomadic people. At the same time, the Iban people migrated from the present day Kalimantan, Indonesia and settled near the banks of the Katibas River (located in the Song District) to find land for farming. Conflict between the Kayan and the Iban people soon grew into a war and the Iban people won. Accepting defeat, the Kayan people then migrated to the Belaga District.

The Malays and the Chinese first arrived in the Song District in the 1800s. They built wooden shophouses with nipah roofs along the river banks and opened floating shops on the river. Initially, the barter system was used, but when Song was acquired by the Kingdom of Sarawak, a monetary system was introduced. The first three Malays to arrive in Song were Mr Haji Tahir, Haji Omar, and Haji Dollah. In 1870, the Brooke government built a fort at Nanga Song (mouth of the Song River). The fort also functioned as Song's first administrative centre and was intended to inhibit Iban uprisings at the Katibas River. The Iban people opposed the introduction of the assessment tax by the Brooke government. Such uprisings lasted until the 1900s. In 1873, Sibu Division was established. Kapit and Song sub-district were included in the division at that time. In 1937, there were 10 Malay houses in Song. The Malay traders at Song were known as Abang (meaning "nobleman"). In the 1820s, they traded with the Ibans in Song in exchange for jungle produce. One of the well-known traders was Haji Ahmed bin Haji Omar. The Malays would sell the jungle produce in Sibau town (present-day Sibu) for a profit. Ships would anchor in Sibu to carry the jungle produce back to their respective destinations for sale. In exchange, these ships brought daily necessities such as salt, sugar, salted fish, plates, bowls, pottery and clothes to trade with the natives. Meanwhile, the Iban people worked as farmers, rubber tappers and jungle produce collectors. The Ibans then sold their products at the Song bazaar in exchange for daily necessities.

During the Japanese occupation, both Allied and Japanese bombing destroyed many of the buildings in the village. Many residents fled Song due to the war. The town became chaotic during the war and its people endured harsh Japanese administration. During this time, the Chinese started to build the first primary school in Song. After the war, the British colonial government gave Sarawak dollars to residents of Song to rebuild their homes. In 1948, the fort at Nanga Song was moved to Nanga Katibas (mouth of the Katibas River). Thus, the administrative centre was effectively moved to the Katibas River. The Chinese also restarted their businesses in Song after the war.

During the British colonial era, the Sarawak Natives Affairs Department was established in 1955. Michael Sardin became the first native officer. During the Indonesia–Malaysia confrontation, Song sub-district office was the operational centre to repel Indonesian military crossings of the Sarawak-Kalimantan border. After the formation of Malaysia in 1963, William Linang became the first Sarawak Administrative Officer in Song. On 2 April 1973, Kapit was upgraded to division. At the same time, Song sub-district was upgraded into a district. In 1977, the administrative centre of Song was moved from the fort at Katibas River to the town centre.

== Government ==
Song District Office governs an area of 38,934 km^{2}.

== Geography and climate ==
Song is one of three districts located within Kapit Division. The other two districts are; Kapit District and Belaga District. The Rajang River is the main river crossing the Song District. Other rivers that cross the district are the; Katibas River, Song River, Iran River, Manap River, Lajan River and Lijau River. These rivers are the main transportation routes for Song residents. 90% of the Song district is covered with uneven highlands,

== Demographics ==
In 2010, Song District had a population of 20,046. The Iban people accounted for 80% of the district population, followed by Chinese, Melanau people, Malay and Bidayuh.

== Transport ==
There are hourly express boat services connecting Song, Sibu, Kanowit, Kapit and Belaga. It is around two hours away from Sibu and an hour from Kapit. The express boats services are provided frequently at Song Wharf Terminal.

A plan to build roads connecting Song to Kapit and Song to Kanowit was promised by the Federal Government and was announced by the Prime Minister of Malaysia during his visit to the town on 15 April 2011.

The bus express of Sibu-Song-Kapit has been available since 2022.

=== Bus Express ===
| Operating Route | Operator |
|---|---|
| Sibu-Kapit | Kapit Bus Express, BusAsia, Lanang Bus |

== Other utilities ==
=== Education ===
Secondary Schools:

- SMK Song
- SMK Song 2
- SMK Katibas

Primary Schools:

- SK (C) Hin Hua
- SK(known as SRB Cardinal Vaughan Song)
- SK Nanga Beguang
- SK NangaTemalat
- SK Nanga Bangkit
- SK Ulu Melipis
- SK Nanga Selibut
- SK Tan Sri Datuk Temenggong Jugah
- SK Nanga Nansang
- SK Nanga Musah
- SK Nanga Janan
- SK Nanga Engkuah
- SK Nanga Embuau
- SK Nanga Dalai
- SK Nanga Nyimoh
- SK Lubok Ipoh
- SK Lubok Bedil
