= Belaga District =

- District
- Coordinates: 2°42′N 113°47′E
- Country: Malaysia
- State: Sarawak
- Division: Kapit

Area
  - Total: 19,403.2 km^{2} (7,491.6 sq mi)

Population (2020)
  - Total: 44,500
  - Density: 2.29/km^{2} (5.94/sq mi)

Belaga is a district in Kapit Division, Sarawak, Malaysia. It is located on the upper reaches of the Rajang River, some 120 kilometers northeast of Kapit and slightly less than 100 kilometers from the South China Sea coast near Bintulu. It is located within the Hulu Rajang parliamentary constituency.

The district population as of 2020 was 44,500 while the area of the district is 19,403.2 km². Belaga was established in the early 1900s when a few Chinese traders set up shops and started trading with the Orang Ulu, supplying essentials such as kerosene, salt and manufactured goods.

== Region ==
There are many Kenyah and Kayan longhouses along the Balui and Belaga rivers, and along the Rejang rivers are the Punan, Sekapan, Kejaman and Tanjung longhouses. It is connected with Kapit by boat known locally as express boat (4.5 hours) and recently, with tar-sealed road, and with Bintulu an 2.5 to 3 hours drive via a tar-sealed road along Bintulu-Bakun Highway, which also includes 34 kilometers of tar-sealed road (Jiwa Murni Road), which span from Mejawah to Belaga town.

== Bakun Dam ==
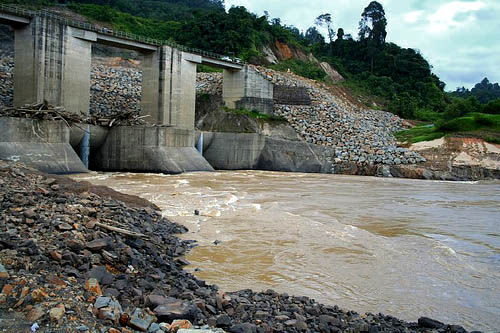
Bakun Dam.

To the north is Bakun Dam, which is the largest dam in Asia outside of China. The dam was intended to provide electricity for Sarawak, other surrounding regions and Peninsular Malaysia, but its construction was delayed several times due to economic circumstances, in particular the 1997 Asian financial crisis. The federal government decided to continue the project, as billions of ringgit had already been spent on it. However, during the early implementation stage of the construction the plan was scaled down in order to reduce cost.

Nevertheless, in January 2007, the Malaysian federal government announced its intention to reactivate the initial plan to transfer the power generated by the dam to Peninsular Malaysia via a submarine power cable. According to the official plan, the submarine cable will span a distance of 670 kilometres and reach the shore of Peninsular Malaysia at Yong Peng, at the state of Johor, southeastern part of the peninsula. Before electricity flowing through the submarine cable, it will initially flow from Bakun to the western tip of Sarawak via over head electric transmission cables traversing a distance of 700 kilometres. The additional project is expected to cost between RM9 billion and RM10 billions. It is expected to be completed the earliest by 2012, but it never reach any completion at all, before it officially cancelled by Sarawak government on 21 September 2017 after the takeover of Bakun Dam on 16 August 2017.

The dam has been accused of uprooting 11,000 Orang Ulu from their traditional homes, clear-cutting hundred of square kilometers of ancient virgin tropical rainforest with consequent losses of hundreds of endangered plants and endangered animals, and forever changing the natural environment of Sarawak.
