= Bruit Island =

Island of Malaysia

- Interactive map of Bruit Island

Geography
- Coordinates: 2°35′0″N 111°20′0″E
- Area: 417 km^{2} (161 sq mi)
- Length: 117.49 km (73.005 mi)

Administration
- Malaysia
- State: Sarawak
- Division: Mukah
- District: Daro

Demographics
- Population: 9,342 (2016)
- Pop. density: 22.4/km^{2} (58/sq mi)

Bruit Island (Malay: Pulau Bruit) is an island in Daro District, Mukah Division, Sarawak, Malaysia. It is located in the Rejang Delta, 150 km northwest of Kuching. With a population of around 9,342 and an area of 417 square kilometres, it is the second largest island in Malaysia after Banggi Island. The mudflats at the northern end of the island have been designated an Important Bird Area by BirdLife International.

== History ==
According to the book Sarawak and Its People, Bruit Island was inhabited before 1830.

== Geography ==
Bruit Island is in the Rejang Delta, with the South China Sea to the north and west, Sarikei to the south and Kuala Matu to the east. The island is separated from the other islands in the Rejang Delta and the mainland by the mouth of the Batang Paloh ("batang" means river in Malay) on the south and Muara Lassa ("muara" means mouth of river) on the east.

Currently, the island is connected to the surrounding mainland and towns by two ferry points; one at the southern end and the other on the eastern side. The southern ferry connects the island by road to Tanjung Manis, a seaport, and Sibu town. The eastern ferry point connects it to Daro town and to Mukah, the divisional administrative centre. Two bridges, Muara Lassa Bridge (2.43 kilometers long) and Batang Paloh Bridge (1.7 kilometers long), which will connect the island with mainland Sarawak are under construction and are slated for completion in December 2024.

A number of fishing villages are located along the coast, especially on the west coast, facing the South China Sea and a few others along the rest of the island's coast. The villages are usually located at the mouth of small rivers on the island. The two main villages are Kampung Semop and Kg. Bruit ("kampung" or "Kg." means village). Currently, a lot of the villages are connected by branch roads joint to the main road traversing the island longitudinally.

Below is a list of villages (kampung) in Bruit Island by population.

- Bruit - 1935
- Tekajong - 1238
- Penipah - 1081
- Salah Kecil - 364
- Penibong - 425
- Penuai - 105
- Kut - 182
- Semop - 1967
- Saai - 174
- Sedi - 69
- Sebako - 773
- Betanak - 905
- Rumah Juing, Sungai Kelai - 124
