= Hose Mountains =

Mountain range in Sarawak, Borneo

Coordinates: 2°7′37″N 113°45′24″E

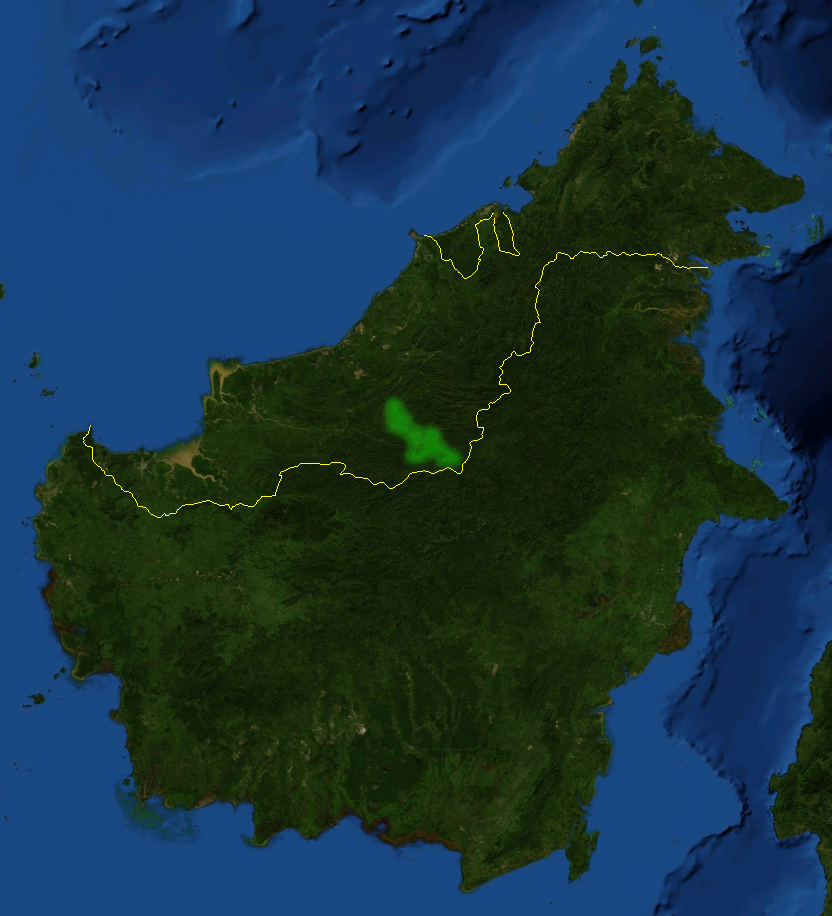
Borneo - Hose Mountains highlighted in green

The Hose Mountains (Malay: Pegunungan Hose) are a mountain range in central Sarawak, Borneo. They span the area between the watersheds of the Balleh and Balui Rivers. The mountains are covered in virgin tropical rainforest that supports a rich ecosystem of fauna and flora, including many endemic species. At least 8 species of Nepenthes are native to the mountain range.

The Hose Mountains are named after British colonial administrator and Zoologist Charles Hose.
