= Igan =

Igan may refer to:

- Arnold "Igan" Clavio (born 1965), Filipino journalist, newscaster, and television host
- Igan, Malaysia, a village in the Malaysian state of Sarawak
- Igan (federal constituency), a federal constituency in Sarawak, Malaysia
- Igan (state constituency), formerly represented in the Sarawak State Legislative Assembly (1969–91)
- IgA nephropathy (IgAN), an autoimmune disease of the kidney
- Igan, Nigeria, a village in the town of Ago Iwoye
