= Song District, Malaysia =

Song
- District
- Country: Malaysia
- State: Sarawak
- Division: Kapit
- Seat: Song

Song is a district, in Kapit Division, Sarawak, Malaysia.
