= Kapit District =

Kapit
- District
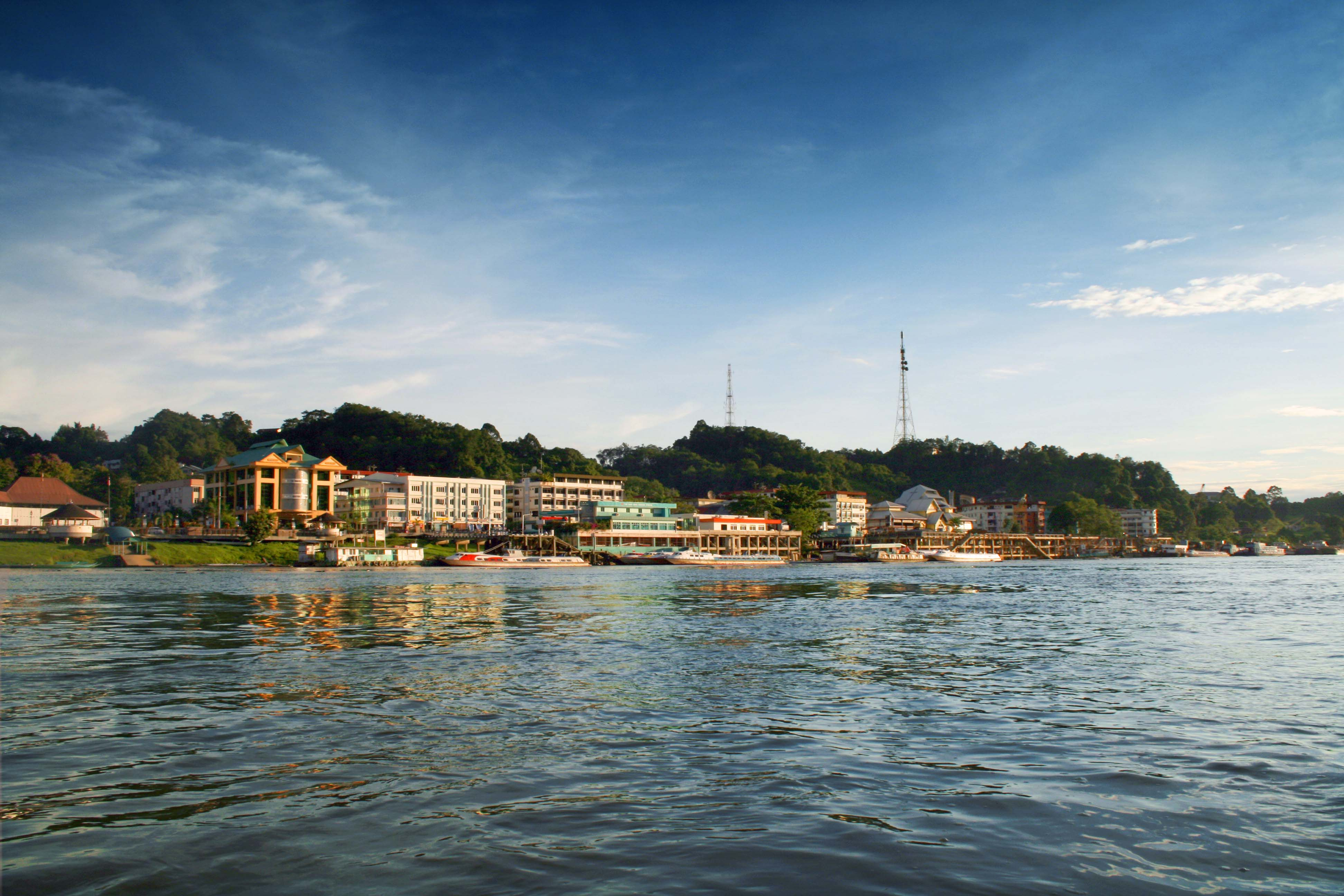
- Kapit town

- Country: Malaysia
- State: Sarawak
- Division: Kapit
- Seat: Kapit

Kapit is a district, in Kapit Division, Sarawak, Malaysia.
