= Kapit =

Town in Sarawak, Malaysia

- Town and district capital
- Bandar Kapit

Chinese transcription(s)
  - Simplified: 加帛
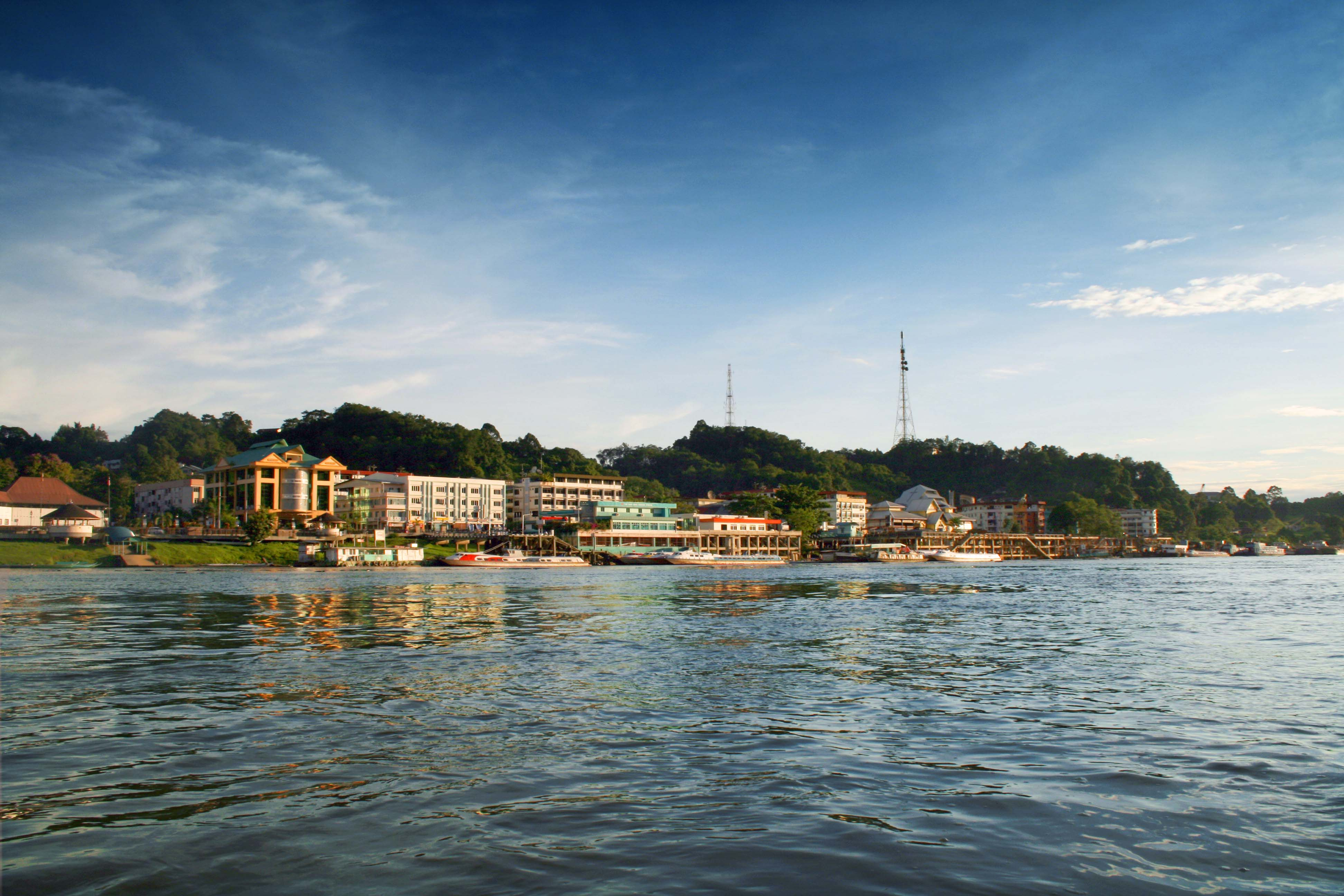
- The Kapit town skyline

- Location within Sarawak Location within Malaysia
- Coordinates: 2°01′0″N 112°56′0″E
- Country: Malaysia
- State: Sarawak
- Division: Kapit
- District: Kapit

Area
  - Total: 15,595.60 km^{2} (6,021.49 sq mi)

Population (2020)
  - Total: 65,800
  - Density: 4.22/km^{2} (10.9/sq mi)
- Website: kapitdc.sarawak.gov.my

Kapit is a town and the capital of Kapit District in Kapit Division, Sarawak, Malaysia on the south bank of the Rajang River. The district comprises 15,595.6 square kilometres and as of 2020, it has a population of 65,800.

Kapit is accessible by boat (slightly more than 2 hours from Sibu by express boat), light aircraft, and most recently by road. Reaching Kapit by car and bus from Sibu takes about 1 hour 30 minutes or about 1 hour from Song. It is the commercial and social center for the middle Rajang River catering to the longhouse communities and timber camps. It is often used as a base for exploring nearby longhouses or for arranging trips to the Upper Rejang and Balleh Rivers.

== History ==
During the reign of Rajah Charles Brooke, a "Fort Kapit" was built in Kapit in 1880 to prevent the Iban from migrating up-river and attacking Orang Ulu settlements. With the security provided by the fort, the area surrounding the fort was settled by Hoklo (Hokkien) Chinese in 1880, additional Hakka Chinese immigrants arrived in 1906, and Fuzhou Chinese in 1919. The Hokkiens worked as labourers while the Hakkas worked as farmers before venturing into businesses. Hock Leong Tieng Temple was built by the Chinese in 1889. Tai San Ten Association was formed in 1935 to serve the interests of Hokkiens and Hakkas. In 1924, a peace treaty was signed between the Iban and the Orang Ulu people at Fort Kapit, thus ending the hostilities between the two tribes permanently. In 1925, "Fort Kapit" was renamed as Fort Sylvia, after the wife of Rajah Vyner Brooke, Rani Sylvia Brooke. The fort had withstood floods in 1887, 1934, 1961 and 1983. On 28 January 1934, Kapit experienced the most severe flood in history with water level as high as 162 feet (49 m).

In 1941, at the time of the Japanese occupation, Kapit only had two rows of 37 shophouses. The town was completely destroyed by allied bombing during the war.

On 15 February 1962, 51 elected Iban chiefs had a meeting in Kapit to discuss the terms and proposals of the formation of federation of Malaysia, before the Cobbold Commission came to Kapit to assess the people's sentiment there. The meeting produced 13 resolutions that agreed to the formation of Malaysia as long as the resolutions were fulfilled.

Kapit was upgraded into a division on 2 April 1973.

== Government ==
Built in 1880, Fort Sylvia once housed the Kapit district office and a magistrate court. After 1973, it housed the Kapit Divisional Office.

Kapit is represented in the Dewan Rakyat as part of the Kapit federal constituency.

== Geography ==
Kapit is located 140 km upriver from Sibu along the Rajang River.

== Climate ==
Kapit has a tropical rainforest climate (Af) with heavy to very heavy rainfall year-round.

Climate data for Kapit
Month	Jan	Feb	Mar	Apr	May	Jun	Jul	Aug	Sep	Oct	Nov	Dec	Year
Mean daily maximum °C (°F)	29.9 (85.8)	30.0 (86.0)	30.7 (87.3)	31.3 (88.3)	31.6 (88.9)	31.4 (88.5)	31.4 (88.5)	31.2 (88.2)	31.2 (88.2)	31.1 (88.0)	30.7 (87.3)	30.4 (86.7)	30.9 (87.6)
Daily mean °C (°F)	26.1 (79.0)	26.2 (79.2)	26.6 (79.9)	27.0 (80.6)	27.2 (81.0)	26.9 (80.4)	26.8 (80.2)	26.7 (80.1)	26.8 (80.2)	26.8 (80.2)	26.5 (79.7)	26.3 (79.3)	26.7 (80.0)
Mean daily minimum °C (°F)	22.3 (72.1)	22.4 (72.3)	22.6 (72.7)	22.7 (72.9)	22.9 (73.2)	22.5 (72.5)	22.2 (72.0)	22.2 (72.0)	22.4 (72.3)	22.5 (72.5)	22.4 (72.3)	22.3 (72.1)	22.5 (72.4)
Average rainfall mm (inches)	382 (15.0)	332 (13.1)	353 (13.9)	288 (11.3)	277 (10.9)	261 (10.3)	201 (7.9)	307 (12.1)	307 (12.1)	372 (14.6)	333 (13.1)	455 (17.9)	3,868 (152.2)
Source: Climate-Data.org

== Demographics ==
Immaculate Conception Church was first established in Kapit in 1882. The church celebrated its 130th anniversary in 2012. Kapit is home to many races like Iban, Chinese, Malay, Bidayuh, Kenyah, Kayan, and Melanau. People in Kapit may be Christian, Muslim, Buddhist, or other religions.

== Transport ==
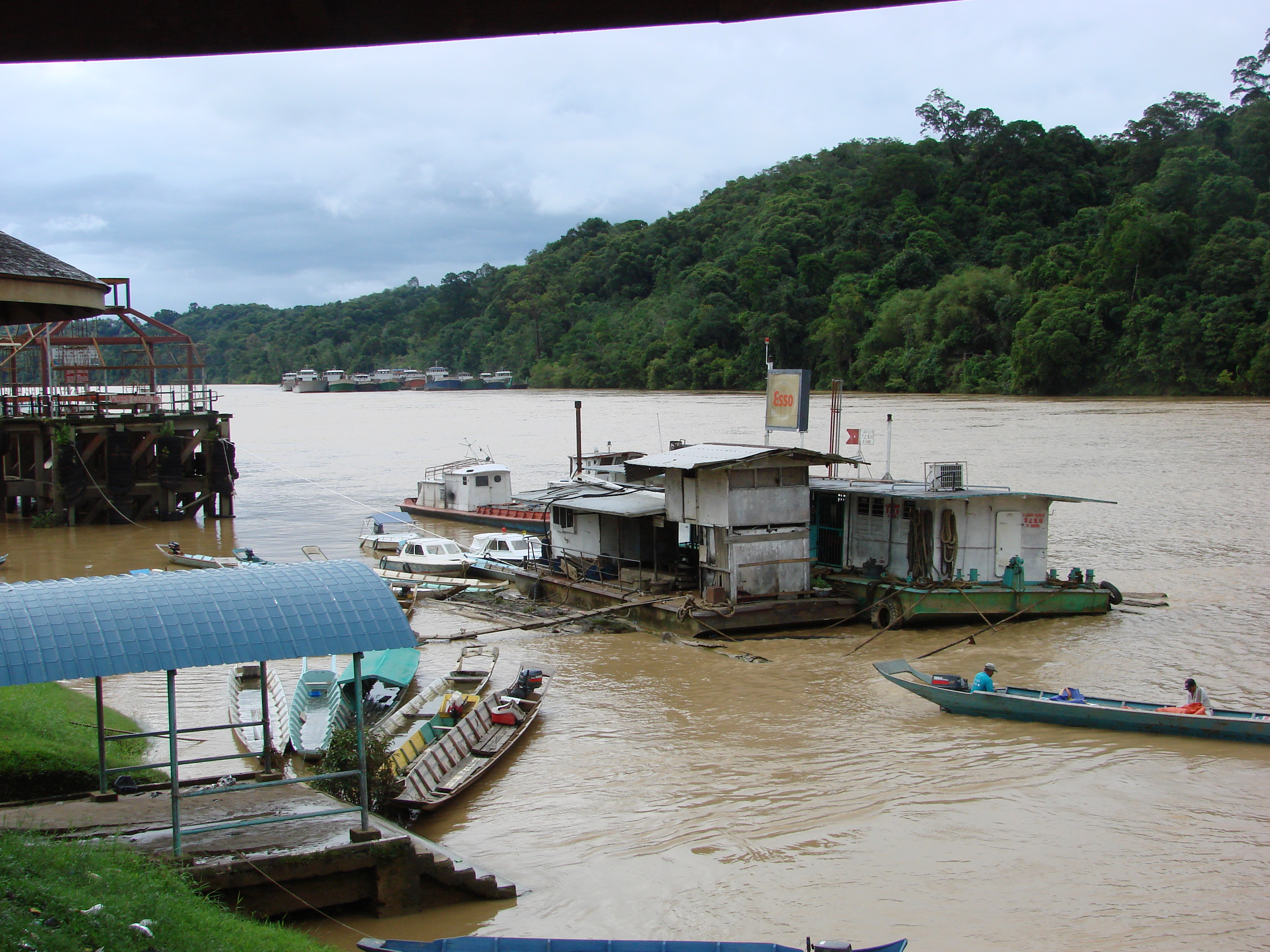
A view at the Kapit wharf terminal.

Kapit is reachable by express boats from Sibu plying the Rajang river. Kapit is also reachable through one hour ride by express boats from Song. Kapit river transport is served by the Kapit express boat terminal. As car transportation has been open to public, express boats became a risk to operate, as customer no longer opt express boats as their main transportation, which could see the demise of local express boat industry in the future.

As of October 2020, Sibu-Kapit road has been open to public, although it is not complete yet. It is accessible by car and takes around 1 hour and 30 minutes to reach there. As road need further refinement for completion, the road is subject to daily opening schedule, which is three times a day. Its opening times are 6.00–7.30 am, 12.00–1.30 pm and 5.00–9.00 pm. It is scheduled to fully operate by 1 December 2020, but due to frequent road travel usage by local, the road completion experienced delay, also factoring the safety of road environment by the working contractor.

As of December 2021, the road finally completed, with the full completion of Yong River Twin Bridge No.1 and No.2. Express bus shuttle service to and fro Sibu and Kapit available less than a month, on New Year 2022, after the road completion.

While the main road, connecting Sibu and Kapit, has completed, the main problem due to lack of available alternative road previously not faced in Kapit is congestion in peak hours, making it harder for motorists to have a smooth and consistent journey. In anticipation of such cases, federal government announced an alternative road would be built at some point, although as of April 2022, there's still no word regarding the project.

=== Bus Express ===
Operating Route	Operator
Kapit-Kuching	BusAsia
Kapit-Sibu	BusAsia, Kapit Bus Express, Lanang Bus

=== Local Bus ===
Operating Route	Operator
Poh Kiong-Kapit bus stop	Kapit Bus Express

== Other utilities ==
=== Education ===
- SK Methodist
- SJK (C) Hock Lam

== Culture and leisure ==
=== Historical ===
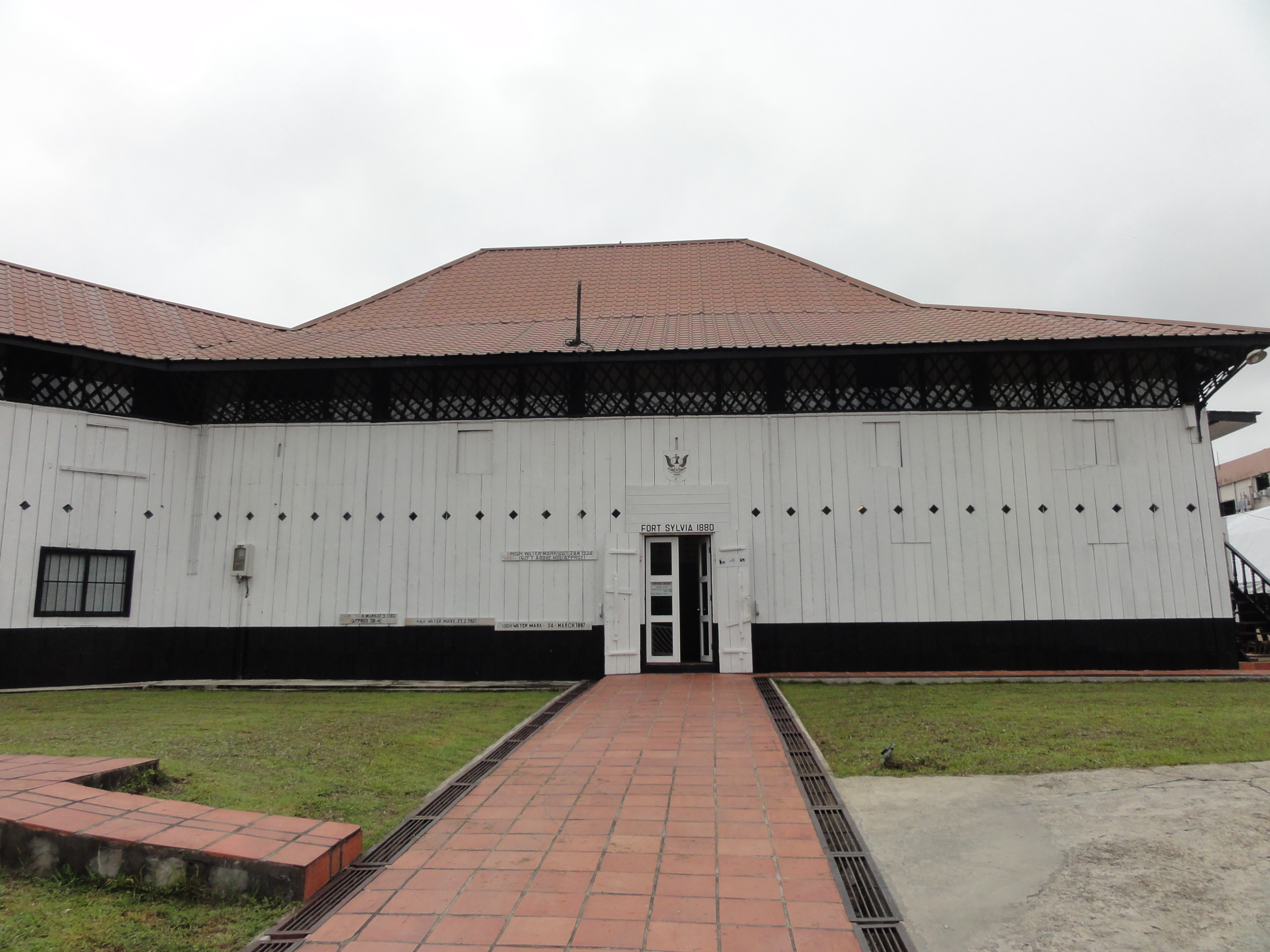
Fort Sylvia is located in the town centre. It houses the museum for Tun Jugah foundation.

There is a museum housed inside Fort Sylvia today. The museum is managed by Tun Jugah foundation. The museum exhibits the photographs and documents depicting the early history of Kapit, photographs and mementos of Jugah Barieng (an Iban paramount leader), Iban costumes, textiles, mural paintings, and Sarawak amber carvings. There is another museum housed at Kapit civic centre.

Built in 1898, Hock Leong Tieng temple is one of the oldest heritage buildings in Kapit. The temple was built with materials and workforce shipped from China in its early days. During World War II, the temple was spared from bombings by Japanese or Allied forces.

Rumah Bundong is one of the oldest longhouses in Kapit. It is located 40 km from town centre. The 50-metre-high Wong Tinggi waterfall is located at one hour walk from the longhouse.

=== Shopping ===
Teresang Market is the largest market in the town of Kapit which sells a variety of daily necessities. It opens from 4 am until 7 pm. Local handicrafts such as rattan products and colourful bead bags are also sold here. Kapit town square is surrounding with shops selling everything from noodles to ropes.

=== Food ===
Kapit is known for its Empurau fish which can sold as high as RM 500 per kilogramme for its rarity and unique taste when being served as an exotic dish. Dishes such as Riang and Rampo are fishes and shrimps cooked using leaves from the forests. A plant called Tubu is used as the natural flavour enhancer. Kapit is also known for its "kasam babi" (preserved pork) and "kasam ikan" (preserved fish).

=== Attractions and recreational spots ===
Pelagus Rapids resort is located at one hour boat ride from Kapit town. The resort was closed since 2012 due to low occupancy rate.

== Notable people ==
- Larry Sng Wei Shien
