= Kejaman =

Ethnic group from Borneo

Kejaman people
Total population
- 1,300-4,000

Regions with significant populations
- Belaga, Sarawak, Malaysia

Languages
- Kejaman; Sarawak Malay; Malaysian English

Religion
- Christianity

Related ethnic groups
- Other Kajang peoples (Punan • Sekapan • Lahanan • Sihan); Other Orang Ulu peoples

The Kejaman people, also known as Kajaman, are an indigenous ethnic group classified under the Orang Ulu of Sarawak, Malaysia. They are part of the Kajang ethnolinguistic cluster, which also includes the Punan, Sekapan, Lahanan and Sihan sub-groups.

Predominantly residing in the Belaga District along the upper Rajang River, their settlements remain relatively isolated, allowing them to preserve their distinct cultural traditions and way of life. Despite their small population, the Kejaman maintain a strong sense of identity through oral traditions, longhouse communal living and participation in broader Kajang cultural practices.

== History ==
The Kejaman are classified as a sub-group within the Kajang ethnolinguistic cluster, which also includes the Punan, Sekapan, Lahanan and Sihan sub-groups. This classification is based on linguistic similarities and shared historical origins. The Kajang peoples, including the Kejaman, have distinct languages and cultural practices, yet they maintain common ancestral narratives and kinship structures.

Historically, the Kejaman people have established settlements in two principal villages, Long Segaham and Long Litten. These settlements were formed in response to inter-ethnic conflicts in the 18th century, which prompted migration and subsequent relocation. Despite their relatively small numbers, the Kejaman have preserved their cultural heritage through oral traditions and longhouse communal living arrangements.

Their geographical location presents both advantages and challenges. While it has helped maintain cultural traditions, access to services such as education and healthcare can be limited due to transportation constraints. Travel options mainly consist of four-wheel-drive vehicles and longboats from Bintulu or express boats from Sibu to Bakun. This restricted connectivity has played a significant role in preserving their traditional lifestyle while simultaneously hindering opportunities for economic advancement.

== Culture ==
The Saviek Festival, held in Umah Kejaman Lasah, Long Segaham, is a significant cultural event for the Kejaman people. It brings together the Kajang community to celebrate and promote traditional customs such as merarau, ngajat ngelezyeang bavui and mejung jejang. Traditionally observed after the harvest season, the festival is also celebrated by the Punan, Sekapan and Lahanan communities. It serves as a platform for preserving cultural heritage, strengthening communal ties and showcasing indigenous traditions to a broader audience.

Efforts to document and preserve Kejaman heritage have also extended to linguistic research. In 2019, Dr. Amee Joan of Universiti Malaysia Sarawak (UNIMAS) published the first Kejaman language dictionary, following four years of research on the community. Her study revealed linguistic similarities between Kejaman and Melanau, while also documenting cultural influences from neighboring indigenous groups such as the Iban, Sekapan and Lahanan. The dictionary serves as an important resource for the preservation of the Kejaman language, particularly as intermarriage and migration contribute to language shift among younger generations.

== See also ==
- Demographics of Sarawak
