= Bakun Dam =

Dam in Kapit, Sarawak, Malaysia

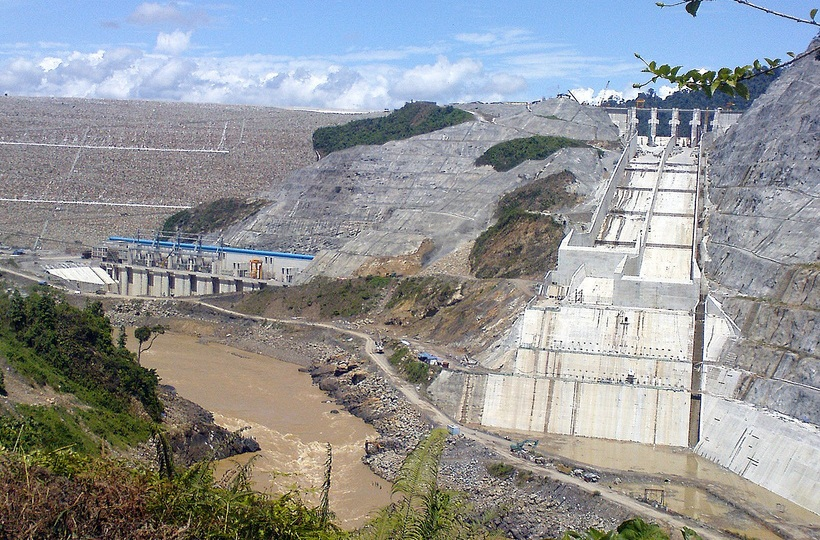
- The dam under construction in June 2009

- Location within Malaysia
- Location: Sarawak; Malaysia
- Coordinates: 02°45′23″N 114°03′47″E
- Construction began: 1996
- Opening date: 2011
- Owners: Sarawak Energy Berhad; Sarawak Hidro Sdn Bhd (Operator)

Dam and spillways
- Type of dam: Embankment, concrete face rock-fill
- Impounds: Balui River
- Height: 205 m (673 ft)
- Length: 750 m (2,461 ft)
- Spillway type: Service, controlled stepped chute
- Spillway capacity: 15,000 m^{3}/s (530,000 cu ft/s)

Reservoir
- Creates: Bakun Reservoir
- Total capacity: 43,800,000,000 m^{3} (35,500,000 acre⋅ft)
- Catchment area: 14,750 km^{2} (5,695 sq mi)
- Surface area: 695 km^{2} (268 sq mi)

Power Station
- Turbines: 8 × 315 MW Francis-type
- Installed capacity: 2,520 MW
- Annual generation: 15,000 to 16,500 GWh
- Website www.sarawakenergy.com

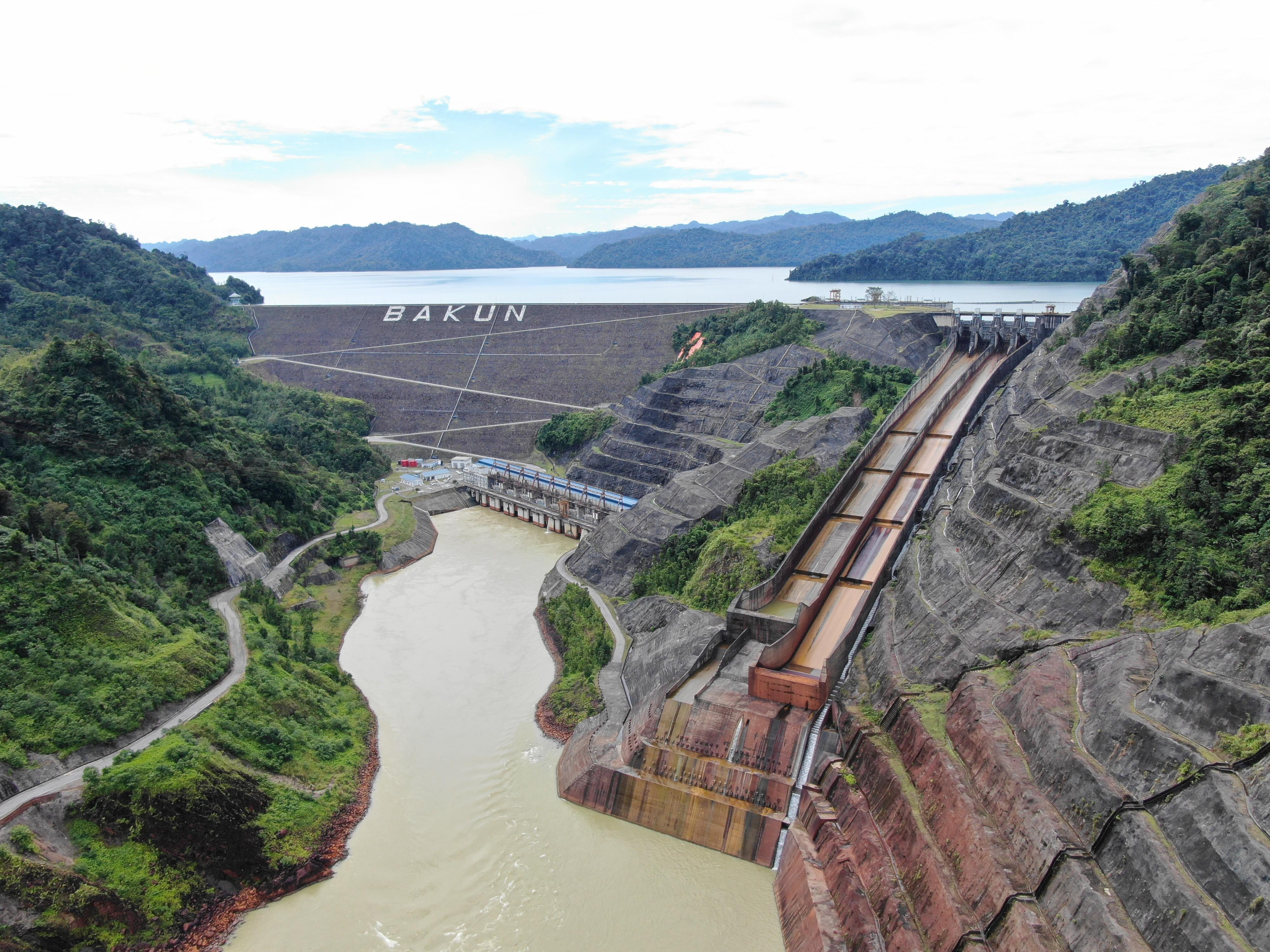
Bakun Hydroelectric Power Station

The Bakun Dam (Malay: Empangan Bakun) is an embankment dam located in Belaga District, Kapit Division, Sarawak, Malaysia, on the Balui River, a tributary or source of the Rajang River and some sixty kilometres east of Belaga. As part of the project, the second-tallest concrete-faced rockfill dam in the world would be built. It would generate 2,400 megawatts (MW) of electricity once completed.

The purpose for the dam was to meet growing demand for electricity. However, most of this demand is said to lie in Peninsular Malaysia and not East Malaysia, where the dam is located. Even in Peninsular Malaysia, however, there is an oversupply of electricity, with Tenaga Nasional Berhad being locked into unfavourable purchasing agreements with Independent Power Producers. The original idea was to have 30% of the generated capacity consumed in East Malaysia and the rest transmitted to Peninsular Malaysia. This plan envisioned 730 km of overhead HVDC transmission lines in East Malaysia, 670 km of undersea HVDC cable and 300 km of HVDC transmission line in Peninsular Malaysia.

Future plans for the dam include connecting it to an envisioned Trans-Borneo Power Grid Interconnection, which would be a grid to supply power to Sarawak, Sabah, Brunei, and Kalimantan (Indonesia). There have been mentions of this grid made within ASEAN meetings but no actions have been taken by any party. Bakun Dam came online on 6 August 2011. As of 2015, Bakun Dam is the biggest dam in Southeast Asia.

On 16 August 2017, Sarawak Energy completes acquisition of Bakun HEP from Federal Government. Under the deal, the Sarawak government will pay Putrajaya RM2.5 billion and take over the remaining RM6.4 billion remaining debts. Prime Minister Najib Razak handed over the dam to the Sarawak government on 5 April 2018.

== Project history ==
=== First attempt ===
Initial survey was conducted in the early 1960s and more studies were conducted in the early 1980s. The studies cover the masterplan and feasibility report, rock and soil studies, hydro potential, detailed design and costing, environmental and socio-economic studies and HVDC transmission studies. Notable consultants involved were SAMA Consortium German Agency for Technical Cooperation, Snowy Mountains Engineering Corporation and Maeda-Okumura Joint Venture, Fichtner and Swedpower Swedish Agency for Technical Cooperation.

Although the project was first approved by government in 1986, it was shelved in 1990 owing to decreased projection of electricity demand due to the recession of 1985 and the decision to use the then low-cost alternative of natural gas as fuel for developing the petrochemical industry.

=== Second attempt ===
It was revived in September 1993 by the Malaysian Federal Government led by then-Prime Minister Mahathir Mohamad. In January 1994, a privatised contract was awarded to Ekran Berhad. In April 1995, Ekran completed the EIA of the project. The project was to cost US$2.4 billion and was originally scheduled for completion in 2003.

The dam was to be built beginning in 1994 by a privatised joint-venture consortium called Bakun Hydroelectric Corporation, comprising Ekran Berhad, Tenaga Nasional Berhad (TNB), the government of Sarawak, Sarawak Electricity Supply Corporation (Sesco), and Malaysia Mining Corporation Bhd (MMC).

Ekran awarded the electromechanical works and the transmission portion to ABB. ABB's consortium partner for the civil works will be Companhia Brasileira de Projetos e Obras (CBPO) of Brazil, a large civil engineering company belonging to the Odebrecht Group, responsible for the construction of the dam and power house. Engineering consulting firms involved in the project then were TNB Hydro, a subsidiary of Tenaga Nasional Berhad and KLIA Consult.

Ekran launched a rights issue to finance the building of the dam, but it was undersubscribed and Ting Pek Khing (Ekran's chairman) had to put up $500 million to take up the unsubscribed portion as part of his agreement with the underwriters. Ekran was a company of Ting Pek Khing, himself a timber businessman. Neither he nor his company had built a dam before. The entire project was not tendered publicly, and instead was awarded by government contract.

The project was halted in 1997 in the face of the Asian financial crisis. When the project was shelved, the Malaysian government took back the project from this consortium. By this time, RM1.6 billion had already been paid out by the government. RM700 million to RM1.1 billion was paid as 'compensation' to Ekran, according to figures disclosed in Parliament. The completed works were the river diversion tunnels by Dong Ah of Korea for RM400 million, and to Global Upline for work completed on the auxiliary cofferdams for RM60 million. Other works are for selective clearing of biomass, and relocation of the affected native residents. The government had also turned over RM1 billion for the purchase of eight turbines.

=== Third attempt ===
In May 2000 it was revived through a 100% government-owned company, Sarawak Hidro, but the transmission of power to Peninsular Malaysia was not part of the revived project. The construction work was tendered out as a turnkey contract. The completion date has been revised to February 2008.

The new civil builder is the Malaysia–China Hydro JV consortium, led by Sime Engineering Berhad of Malaysia (a subsidiary of Sime Darby and Sinohydro Corporation of China. Other members of the consortium are WCT Berhad, MTD Capital, Ahmad Zaki Resources, Syarikat Ismail and Edward & Sons. It targeted a completion date of September 2007. The total sum to be paid to this consortium was budgeted at RM1.8 billion. The electromechanical works for the turbines were awarded in two contracts to IMPSA of Argentina and Alstom of France.

In 2004, engineering consulting firm JR Knowles, was hired to study the delays in construction. Other engineering consulting firms involved in the project were Snowy Mountain Engineering Corporation, of Australia and Opus International Malaysia.

==== Items of temporary interest during third attempt ====
In May 2004 Ting Pek Khing's name again was raised in connection with the project. A Ting-owned company, Global Upline, was rumoured to have been awarded a contract to undertake "biomass removal" in the flood basin. This would allow him to harvest timber in the area without a separate permit. Issuance of timber permits has come under increased scrutiny due to political conditions and environmental concerns. However, as of December 2006 it has not been awarded.

Usage of the generated capacity was to have been by a proposed aluminium smelting plant in Similajau, near Bintulu, approximately 180 km inland from the dam. The project is a joint venture between Dubai Aluminum Co, Ltd (Dubal) and Gulf International Investment Group (GIIG), an investment fund jointly set up by Malaysian tycoon Syed Mokhtar, and Dubai-based international financier Mohamed Ali Alabbar. This plant was expected to consume 50% of the power generated. The government has agreed in principle that 60% of Sarawak Hidro, the entity that owns the dam, will be sold to GIIG. Owing to delays in dam construction, the plans for the smelter have since been shelved. The agreement for this smelter was originally signed in 2003 and some conditions have lapsed owing to delays in construction. Rio Tinto announced in August 2007 that they had signed a deal with Malaysian conglomerate Cahya Mata Sarawak Berhad (CMSB) to build an aluminium smelter. The production capacity would be 550,000 tonnes initially with expansion to 1.5 million tonnes possible. Production of aluminium would start at the end of 2010.

At the end of 2004, the minor partners in the Malaysia–China Hydro JV consortium (Ahmad Zaki Resources Bhd, WCT Engineering Bhd and MTD Capital) will report quarterly losses due to the Bakun project. Discounting this project, they would all be operating profitably for the quarter.

- For Ahmad Zaki Resources Bhd, this is the first time it will report losses since 1993. Ahmad Zaki estimates net losses suffered for nine months ending 30 September 2004 at RM4.55 million.
- WCT has reported a net loss of RM13.08 million for the quarter ending 30 September 2004 due to the Bakun project.
- MTD Capital reported a RM4.04 million loss in the quarter ending 30 September 2004 and attributed it to "a major project undertaken by the company in joint venture with both local and foreign partners" without specifically naming Bakun.
- The lead partner in the project, Sime Engineering reported a profit of RM521,000 for the same quarter versus a profit of RM4.18 million for the same quarter in 2003. Declines in profit were attributed to cost overruns and project delays.

As of February 2007, there are three developments affecting the Bakun project. The first is the merger of the Sime Darby, Guthrie and Golden Hope into a new entity named Synergy Drive. The second is the proposed takeover of the Bakun project by the contractor, Sime Engineering. The third is the revival of the submarine HVDC cable under the South China Sea to transmit electricity from Borneo to Peninsular Malaysia.

In November 2007, Sime Darby, the parent company of the contractor Sime Engineering will be merged with Golden Hope and Guthrie into a new company with a market capitalisation of RM31 billion (US$8 billion). Concurrently with the merger, the contractor Sime Engineering will takeover the ownership of the Bakun Dam project.

Sime Engineering Sdn Bhd has filed a suit against AZRB over alleged breaches in the Malaysia–China Hydro joint venture agreement dated 12 June 2002 relating to the Bakun dam. AZRB was served with a writ summons and statement of claim dated 12 Oct by Sime Engineering claiming "RM15.24 million for alleged breaches by AZRB of the Malaysia–China Hydro JVA" relating to Bakun hydroelectric project package CW2 – main civil works.

==== Sinohydro flawed construction procedures ====
Chinese constructor Sinohydro has acknowledged that its construction procedures used for Bakun were flawed. The admission came after Sarawak Report reported that Sinohydro had widely used a technique involving adding excessive water to cement, with potentially dangerous consequences. The Sarawak Report said its website was attacked by Chinese scammers after it published the report.

== Environmental and social damage ==
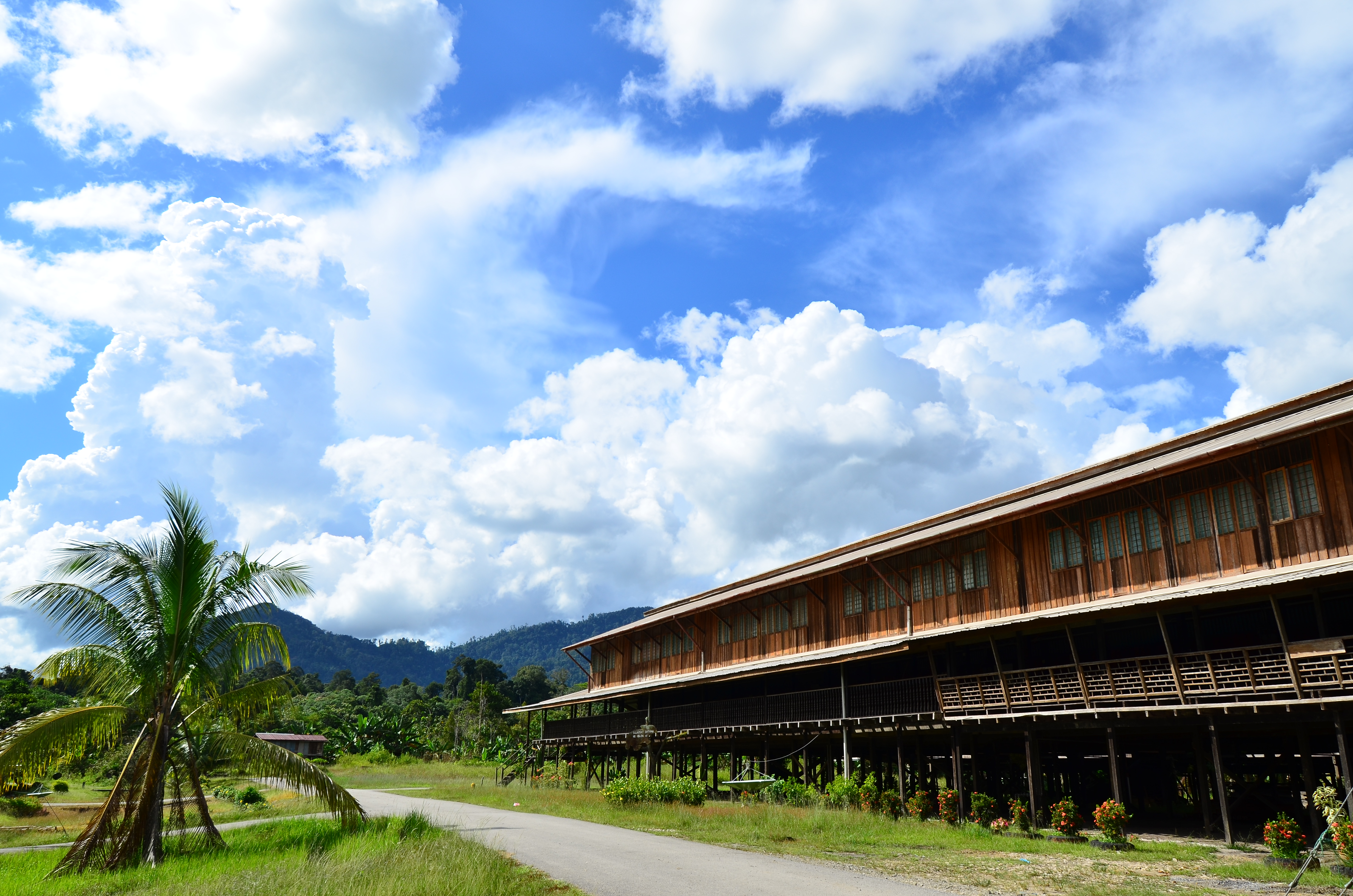
Uma Daro longhouse is one of the longhouses built in Sungai Asap for the relocation of the natives displaced by the Bakun Dam.

The Bakun dam flooding commenced on 13 October 2010 with a faulty start and will put 700 km^{2} of land underwater – equivalent to the size of Singapore. The rainforest of this part of Southeast Asia has some of the highest rates of plant and animal endemism, species found there and nowhere else on Earth, and this dam has done irreparable ecological damage to that region.

Construction of the dam required the relocation of more than 9,000 native residents (mainly Kayan/Kenyah) of the indigenous peoples who lived in the area to be flooded. Many Sarawak natives have been relocated to a longhouse settlement named Sungai Asap in Bakun. Most of them were subsistence farmers. Each family was promised 3 acres (1.21 ha) of land but many families still have not been compensated. The government ignored the recommendations of experts it hired to consider the socio-cultural consequences of the relocation. Many of the problems that followed the relocation would have been avoided if the people affected by the dam had been relocated to higher ground in the region.

Concerns were raised also about such things as the relocation of people; the amount of virgin tropical rainforest that had to be cut down (230 km^{2}); possible dam collapse issues; increase in diseases with waterborne vectors such as schistosomiasis, opisthorchiasis, malaria, and filariasis; and sediment accumulation shortening the useful lifespan of the dam. A 5-part series of Bakun dam documentaries was filmed by Chou Z Lam. The series highlighted the basic community problems faced by displaced indigenous people such as the lack of land areas for farming and hunting caused by the flooding, lack of educational, medical, and transport facilities, and also the promises not being kept by the government. This documentary series was later banned from Radio Television Malaysia (RTM) in May 2010, forcing the remaining series to YouTube.

Transparency International includes Bakun Dam in its 'Monuments of corruption' Global Corruption Report 2005. The mandate to develop the project went to a timber contractor and friend of Sarawak's governor. The provincial government of Sarawak is still looking for customers to consume the power to be generated by the project.

Launched in February 2012, an international NGO coalition that includes organisations from the US, Norway and Switzerland is showing its solidarity with Malaysian groups who are protesting against the construction of twelve hydroelectric dams in the Malaysian state of Sarawak on Borneo. The NGO coalition supports the Malaysian groups' demand for an immediate halt to the realisation of these dams, which threaten to displace tens of thousands of Sarawak natives and flood hundreds of square miles of Sarawak's precious tropical rainforests.

== Technical specifications ==
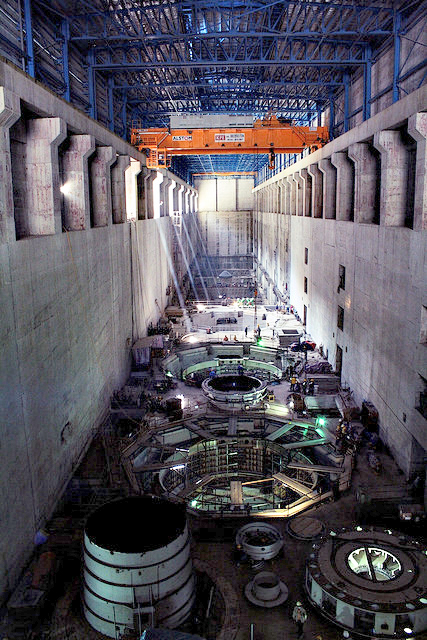
View of turbines inside the powerhouse in 2009.

The permanent dam components are as follows:

- Main dam
  - Maximum height above foundation of 205 m, and crest length of 750 m, volume of fill is 16,710,000 m^{3}.
  - Crest elevation is 235 m above sea level (ASL), maximum flood level is 232 m, operating levels maximum 228 m and minimum 195 m.
  - Reservoir area at 228 m ASL is 695 km^{2}, and with a catchment area of 14,750 km^{2}. Gross storage volume is 43,800 million cubic meters.
- Power intake structure – 8 bays with 16 roller gates.
- Gated spillway – gated concrete weir with chute and flip bucket, with capacity of 15,000 cubic meters per second.
- Power tunnels – 8 tunnels of 8.5 m diameter each with lengths of 760 m each.
- Powerhouse
  - Surface powerhouse, with 4-level measuring 250 m length × 48 m width × 48 m height
  - with 8 penstocks to powertrains comprising 8 vertical-shaft Francis turbines of 300 MW each, 8 air-cooled generators of 360 MVA each and 8 oil-immersed transformers of 360 MVA each.

== Transmission lines ==
There are four major transmission line sections:

The first consists of an HVAC double circuit overhead line running over a distance of 160 km from Bakun Dam to Similajau Static Inverter Plant, situated east of Bintulu.

The three further sections consist of a bipolar HVDC 500 kV line. The first section of this line running from Similajau Static Inverter Plant to Kampung Pueh on Borneo will be implemented as overhead lines with a length of 670 km.

The next section is the submarine cable between Kampung Pueh to Tanjung Leman, Johor. It will have a length of 670 km. It is planned to be implemented by 3 or 4 parallel cables each with a transmission capacity of 700 MW.

The last section on the Malay Peninsula will consist of an overhead DC powerline running from Tanjung Leman to the static inverter plant at Bentong.

As part of the transmission works two converter stations will be built at Bakun and Tanjung Tenggara. The HVDC lines will connect to the National Grid, Malaysia operated by Tenaga Nasional Berhad.

=== Revival of submarine cable component ===
The revived submarine cable portion is to transmit the electricity generated at Bakun Dam in Borneo to Peninsular Malaysia, possibly by 2012. The consortium partners' equity possibly will be Sime Darby (60%), Tenaga Nasional (20%) and the Malaysian Ministry of Finance (20%). The consortium is exploring financing facilities of up to 80% of the planned investment.

The cable is planned to transmit 1,600 MW of power from the Bakun Dam to Yong Peng, Johor by undersea HVDC power cables and then by land line onto the Malaysian National Grid. The use of HVDC cables would ensure that the energy loss is minimal, at about 5% to 6% only. The cost of the undersea cable is estimated at RM9 billion. The proposed concept is for two 800 MW cables being laid about 660 km under the South China Sea from the Sarawak shore to Yong Peng on Peninsular Malaysia.

Sime Darby would take ownership of the submarine cable project but not undertake its construction. The contractor is rumoured to be Malaysian Resources Corporation Berhad (MRCB), a public listed company on the KLSE.

The buyer of the electricity is Tenaga Nasional. The rate proposed is RM0.17 per kilowatt hour at the intake onto the National Grid. Analysts estimated that generation cost using world-market-rate natural gas would cost RM0.22 per kilowatt hour. A 4% increase every 4 years is envisaged over the 35-year concession period.

On 7 January 2008, Sime Darby announced that they had appointed a financial adviser for the undersea power transmission project. However, the company did not name the financial adviser.

After many delays, Sarawak Energy Berhad announced that the contract to build the submarine cable would be awarded in mid-2010 with international tenders to be called in early 2010. It was expected that the construction would be completed by 2015 at an estimated cost of MYR8 billion to MYR10 billion. However, the project has been shelved.

== Records ==
Once completed:

- Bakun Dam will be the tallest concrete-faced rockfill dam (CFRD) in the world.
- Bakun Lake will be the biggest lake in Malaysia by storage volume.
- Bakun Lake will be the largest lake in Malaysia by surface area, even though it is not apparent on the map, owing to the narrow shapes of the various lake arms, as a result of its location in the highland valleys.
- Bakun Power Station will be the largest hydroelectric dam in Malaysia, surpassing the currently largest Pergau Dam.
- Bakun submarine power cable will be the longest in the world, surpassing the current Norway-to-Netherlands submarine cable.

== See also ==
- National Grid, Malaysia
- Sarawak Energy
- List of HVDC projects
- List of power stations in Malaysia
