= Igan, Malaysia =

Igan Kampung Igan
- Sub-district in Sarawak
- Location in East Malaysia Location in Malaysia
- Coordinates: 2°49′25″N 111°42′24″E
- Country: Malaysia
- State: Sarawak
- Division: Mukah
- Subdistrict: Igan

Area
  - Total: 248 km^{2} (96 sq mi)
- Time zone: UTC+8 (MST)
- Postcode: 96300

Igan (known in Malay as Kampung Igan) is a village and a subdistrict in Matu District, Mukah Division, Sarawak, Malaysia. It is situated near the mouth of Igan River with the South China Sea. Igan is about 50 kilometres (31 miles) to the west of Mukah, the division's administrative town, where as the nearest town is Oya with a distance of about 23 kilometres (14 miles). Igan is a type of fish that can only find around the village.

Igan has a primary school, namely Kampung Igan National School (Malay: Sekolah Kebangsaan Kampung Igan).
