= Katibas River =

River in Sarawak, Malaysia

Katibas River (Malay: Sungai Katibas) is a river in Sarawak, Malaysia. It is a tributary of the Rajang River.

== See also ==
- List of rivers of Malaysia
