= Balui River =

River in Sarawak, Malaysia

Balui River (Malay: Sungai Balui) is a river in Sarawak, Malaysia. It is a tributary of the Rajang River. On the river is located the 2,400-megawatt Bakun hydroelectric dam, some sixty kilometres east of Belaga.

== See also ==
- List of rivers of Malaysia
