= Tanjung Leman =

Coordinates: 2.1517391°N 104.0027535°E

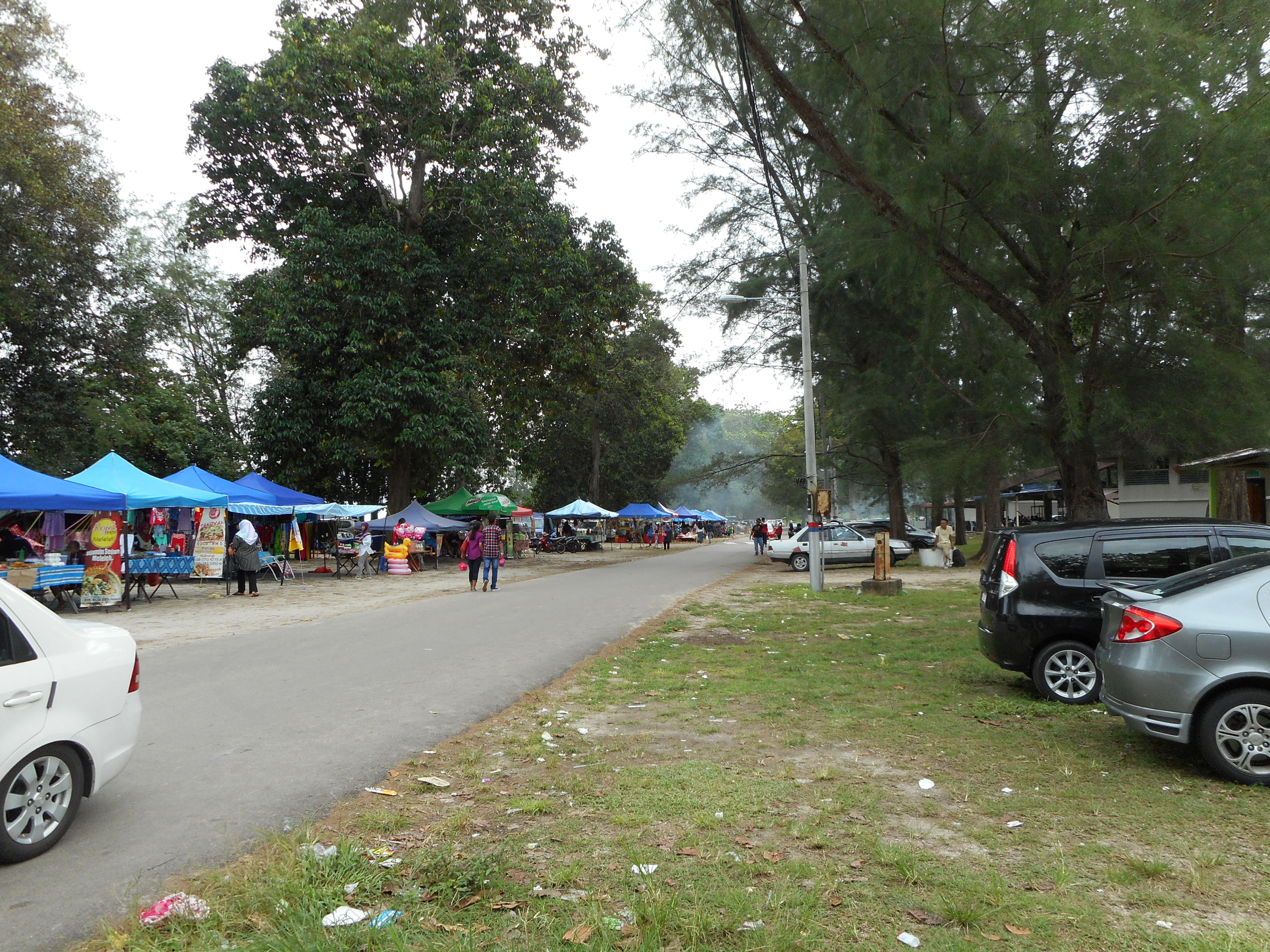
Tanjung Leman

Tanjung Leman is a coastal area in Mersing District, Johor, Malaysia. Tanjung Leman Beach is a beach which is popular among the locals.
