= Iran Mountains =

Mountains in Indonesia and Malaysia

Coordinates: 2°27′29″N 115°07′23″E

The Iran Mountains are a range of mountains on the island of Borneo. The mountains are on the border between Indonesia and Malaysia.

== See also ==
- Geography of Indonesia
- Geography of Malaysia
