= Igan River =

River in Sarawak, Malaysia

Igan River Batang Igan
- Native name: Sungai Igan (Malay)

Physical characteristics
- Source
  - location: Rajang River
- Mouth
  - location: South China Sea
  - coordinates: 2°51′N 111°39′E
- Length: 97.05 km (60.30 mi)

The Igan River (Malay: Sungai Igan) is a river in Sarawak, Malaysia. It joins the Sungai Rajang in Sibu. The 95 km long river is still used as the primary route for travel to a number of rural districts in Sarawak.

== See also ==
- List of rivers of Malaysia
