= Punan Bah =

Ethnic group from Borneo

Punan Bah people Punan people
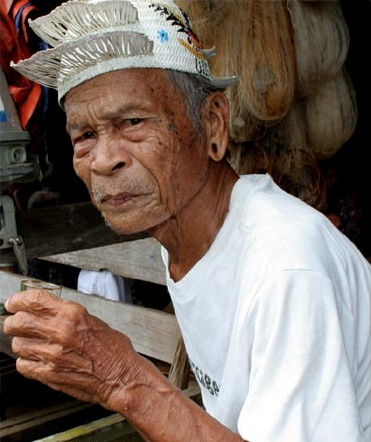
- An elderly Punan man

Total population
- approx. 5,000

Regions with significant populations
- Malaysia; Sarawak (Kapit and Bintulu Division) Indonesia; West Kalimantan, North Kalimantan, and East Kalimantan

Languages
- Punan Bah; Malay; Indonesian; English

Religion
- Christianity; animism

Related ethnic groups
- Dayak; Sekapan; Kejaman; Lahanan'

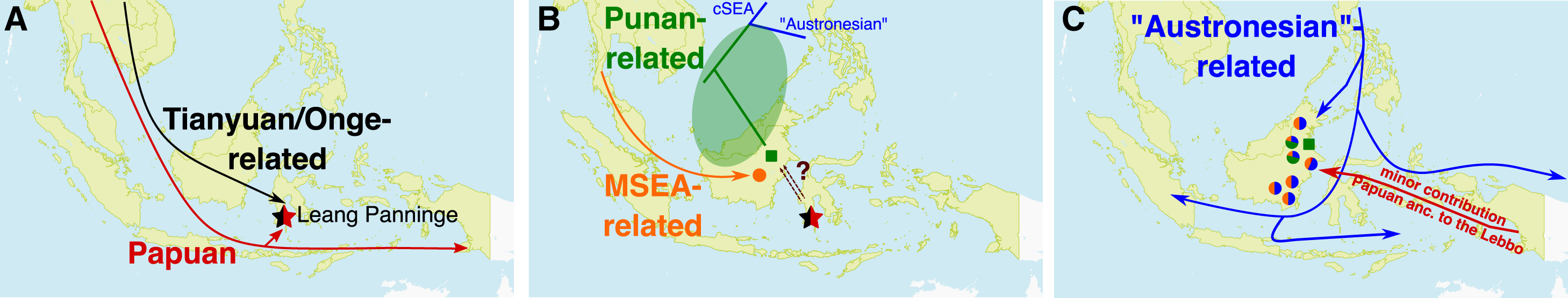
Schematic summary of population settlement in Insular Southeast Asia. Dispersals of ancestries associated with ancient Mainland Southeast Asian and ancestral Punan-related components (B) predating the coastal South Chinese, and hence Austronesian-related, ancestries.

Punan Bah or Punan is an ethnic group found in Sarawak, Malaysia, and Kalimantan, Indonesia. The Punan Bah people are distinct and unrelated to the semi-nomadic Penan people, also of Borneo. Their name stems from two rivers along the banks of which they live. They have other names, including Mikuang Bungulan or Mikuang and Aveang Buan, which are only used ritually.

The Punan Bah previously based their living on a mixed economy—swidden agriculture with hill paddies as the main crop, supplemented by a range of tropical plants, including cassava, taro, sugar cane, and tobacco. Hunting, especially wild boar, fishing, and gathering of forest resources, are other important factors in their economy.

In the late 1980s, many younger, more educated Punan, gradually migrated to urban areas, such as Bintulu, Sibu, Kuching, and Kuala Lumpur, in search of better living conditions. Many would return home during major festivities, such as the Bungan harvest festival.

The society of the Punan Bah is stratified into 'laja' (aristocrats), 'panyen' (commoners), and 'lipen' (slaves).

== Ethnic classification and naming confusion ==
According to the Sarawak Interpretation Ordinance, the Punan are classified as part of the Kajang ethnolinguistic cluster, which also includes the Kejaman, Sekapan, Lahanan, and Sihan subgroups.

In Sarawak, the Punan are often confused with the similarly named Penan people.

=== Genetics ===
Research on northeast Bornean Punan communities has shown that they display strong genetic ancestry connections to each other and that they form an outgroup to other Austronesian-speaking groups. The results of a 2023 study "support long-term occupation of Borneo by Punan-related people" predating the arrival of other Austronesian speakers from which they diverged earlier.

== Language ==
The Punan speak the Bah-Biau Punan language, one of the Punan languages.

== Religion and beliefs ==
The Punan traditionally practise a form of animist known as Besavik. The Brooke era saw the arrival of Christian missionaries, who brought education and modern medicine to Sarawak. The Punan have also adopted the cult religion of Bungan.

== Associations ==
As of 2013, there were two Punan associations:

- Persatuan Kebangsaan Punan (Punan National Association), Malaysia
- Yayasan Adat Punan (Punan Culture Foundation), Indonesia
