= Balleh River =

River in Sarawak, Malaysia

Balleh River (Malay: Sungai Balleh) is a river in Sarawak, Malaysia. It is a tributary of the Rajang River. In 1983 it was navigated by Redmond O'Hanlon and James Fenton. The journey is described in O'Hanlon's book, Into the Heart of Borneo.

== See also ==
- List of rivers of Malaysia
