= Tanjung Manis District =

Tanjung Manis
- District
- Country: Malaysia
- State: Sarawak

Tanjung Manis is a district in Mukah Division, Sarawak, Malaysia. The capital of the district is Tanjung Manis town.

== History ==
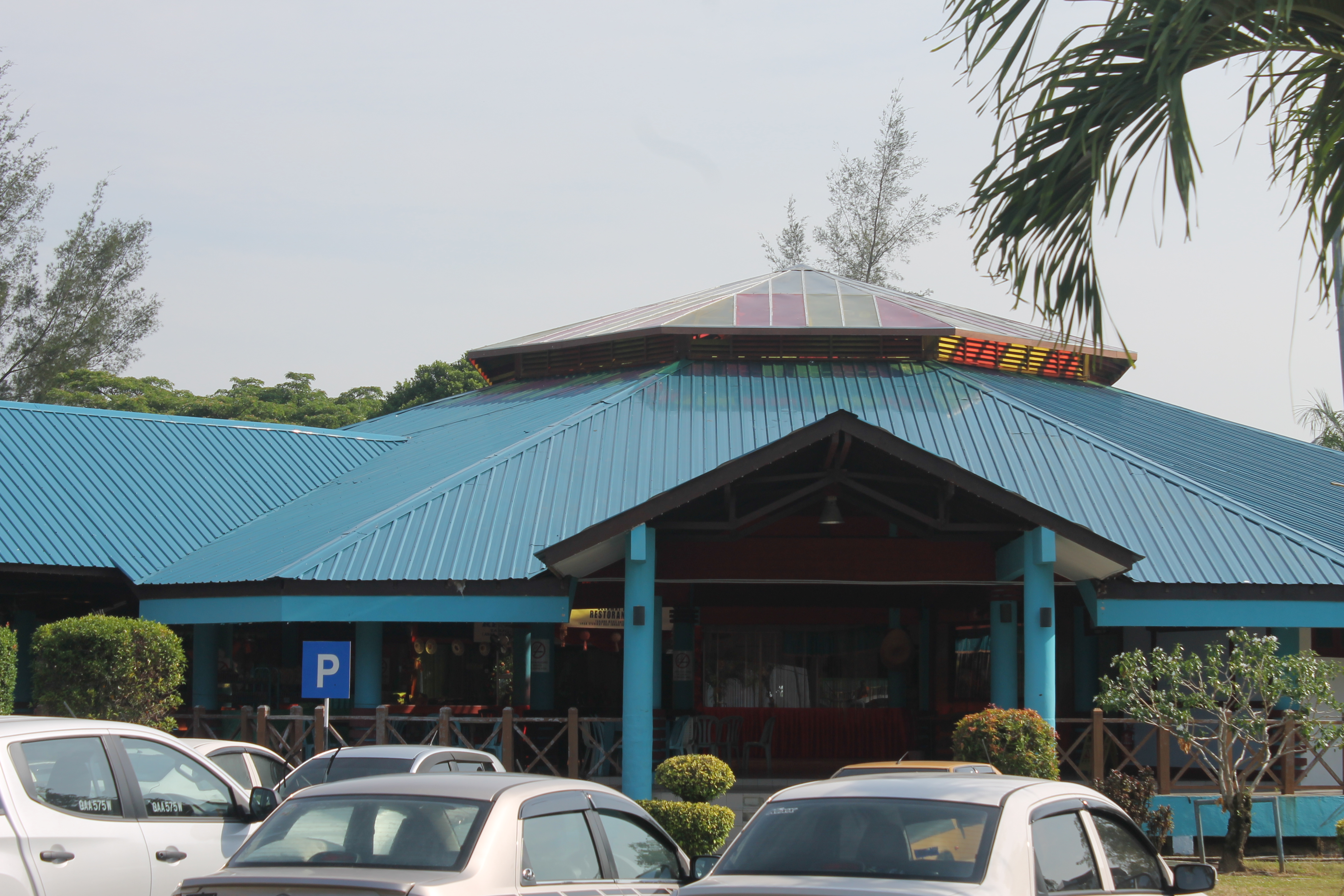
Tanjung Manis market.

The Tanjung Manis District was originally named "Belawai sub-district" on 7 April 1973 and was placed under the administration of Sarikei Division. On 1 March 2002, Belawai sub-district was placed under the administration of Mukah Division. On 11 February 2008, Sarawak Corridor of Renewable Energy (SCORE) was launched. The town of Tanjung Manis is designated as halal food hub and Tanjung Manis Integrated Port was built here. On 1 August 2015, the Belawai sub-district was concurrently upgraded into a district and renamed to Tanjung Manis District.

== Administration ==
Tanjung Manis District covers an area of 730.53 km^{2}.

== Town and villages ==
=== Tanjung Manis ===
The town is located 82 km away from Sibu, 19.5 km from Tanjung Manis airport, and 28 km from Sarikei. The government of Sarawak started to develop this area in the 1990s because of its strategic location as a protected harbour for timber processing industry. In 1994, the construction of timber processing zone (TPZ) was completed. About 1,000 houses were built in 1995. Central oil distribution terminal was completed in 2002. There were 40 shophouses as of January 2022. In November 2022, 16-storey Tanjung Manis administrative centre was built. The administrative centre commence operation in 2023.

=== Belawai ===
Belawai was the former administrative centre for Tanjung Manis district. Based on a census in 2018, Belawai village occupies 3,730 hectares with 2,823 inhabitants. The village is also notable for its beaches and fishery industry. In 2023, Tanjung Manis district office was moved from Belawai to the town of Tanjung Manis.

=== Jerijeh ===
Jerijeh village is located 20 km from the town of Tanjung Manis. Tanjung Manis airport is located here.

=== Rajang ===
Rajang village developed its own songket weaving industry since 1991.

== Population ==
The majority of the population in the district are Melanau.

== Economy ==
Tanjung Manis District has been designated as a growth area under Sarawak Corridor of Renewable Energy (SCORE) since 2008 as aquaculture, timber-based, and marine engineering industry. As a result of this plan, Integrated Deep Sea Fishing Port, Tanjung Manis Integrated Port and Oil Gas Chemical terminal, and a wood-based industrial area were set up.

Tanjung Manis anchorage existed from the 1950s to the 60s for ocean-going vessels to load and unload goods. In the 1990s, Japan International Corporation Agency recommended the Sarawak government build port facilities at the Tanjung Manis anchorage site. The project was completed in November 1997 and was put under the administration of Rajang Port Authority (RPA) in Sibu. However, the port failed to attract shippers due to the absence of road access to the town of Sibu and also the 1997 Asian financial crisis. In 2009, Tanjung Manis Integrated Port Sdn. Bhd (a subsidiary of Sarawak Timber Development Corporation (STIDC)), started to oversee the port operations. The port started to receive more traffic since then. Since April 2012, the port administration was transferred from RPA to newly established Tanjung Manis Port Authority (TMPA). Evergreen Marine Corporation, MTT Shipping and Pacific Selatan Agency are the carriers that used Tanjung Manis port as one of their shipping stops. Revenue of Tanjung Manis Integrated Port stood at RM1 million in 2016. Total export value of Tanjung Manis Port from January to September 2022 stood at RM1.2 billion. Main export commodities in 2016 were: coal, agricultural products, woodchip, plywood, sawn timber, and logs. Main import commodities were: building materials, veneer, animal feeds, foodstuffs, hardware, and textile.

The district is famous for its fishery industry, especially the catches of giant tiger prawn (known as Udang harimau locally). There is also s small-scale prawn processing industry. The prawns' shells are removed and put into cold storage or made into smoked prawns to be sold later to nearby towns and cities, especially Sibu.

== Transportation ==
=== Water ===
There is a Tanjung Manis Port.

=== Air ===
There is an airport in the district named Tanjung Manis Airport.

=== Road ===
Although 70% of Tanjung Manis district can be accessed by roads, 30% of the areas still requires water transport such as Paloh, Stalun, Sebayang, Sungai Berangan and Telok Gelam. The district is connected to Sibu through a network of trunk road and ferry services.

Bus Route No.	Operating Route
23	Sibu-Tanjung Manis Jetty-Belawai
9	Sarikei-Tanjung Manis Jetty-Belawai

== Culture and leisure ==
=== Attraction and recreational spots ===
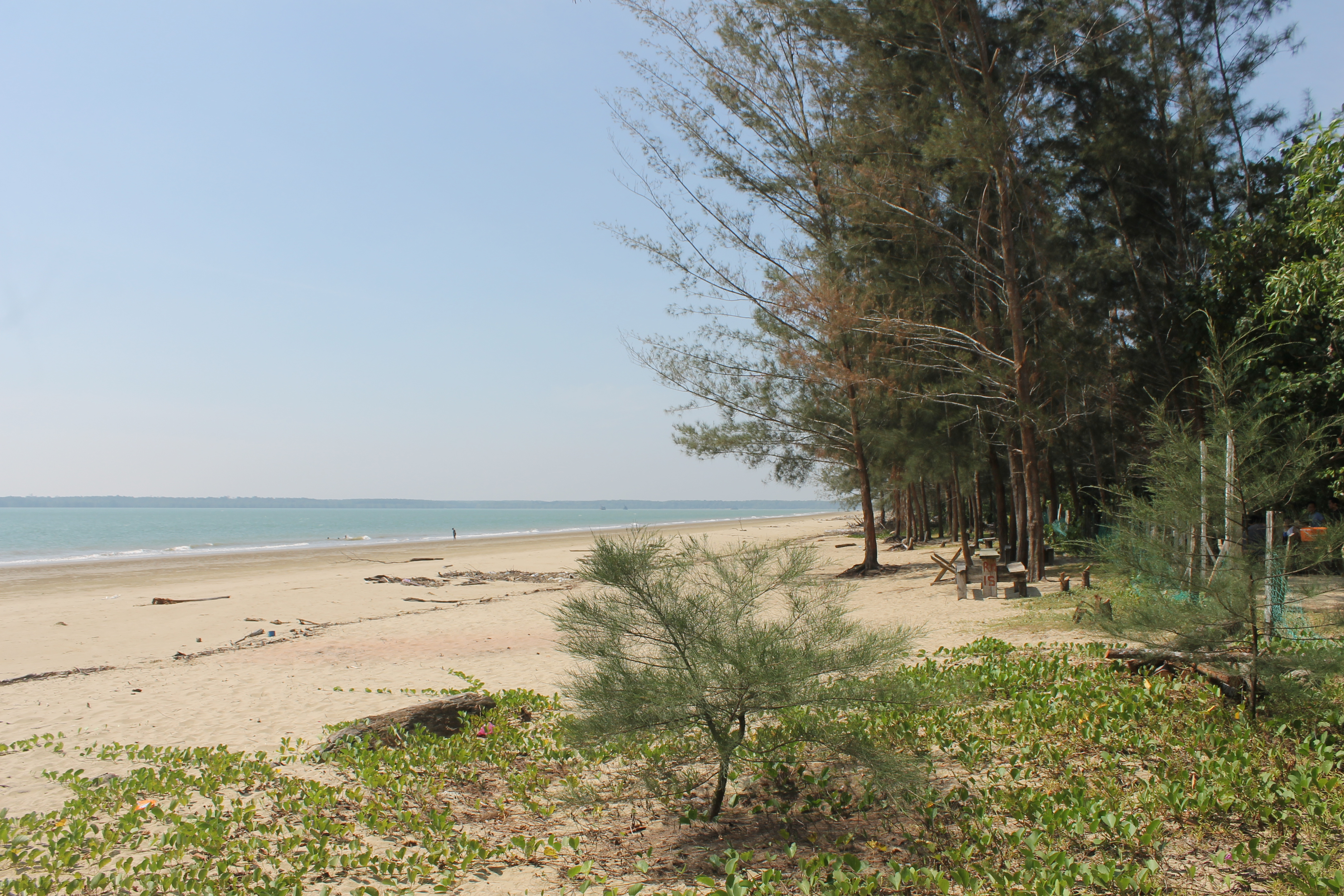
The Belawai beach

With the construction of Sibu-Tanjung Manis road, the Belawai beach is more accessible to the public.

== Industrial development ==
In 2026, PMW International Berhad entered into a share subscription and shareholders' agreement with the Sarawak Timber Industry Development Corporation (STIDC) to develop a new concrete poles and piles manufacturing facility in Tanjung Manis through a subsidiary, PMW Winabumi (Sarawak) Sdn Bhd. Under the agreement, STIDC holds a 20% equity interest and contributes industrial land for the facility, with PMW retaining an 80% interest. The facility is intended to support growing infrastructure, electricity grid expansion, and 5G rollout demand in Sarawak.
