= Kapit Division =

Coordinates: 1°57′07.2″N 112°56′35.1″E

Kapit
- Division of Sarawak
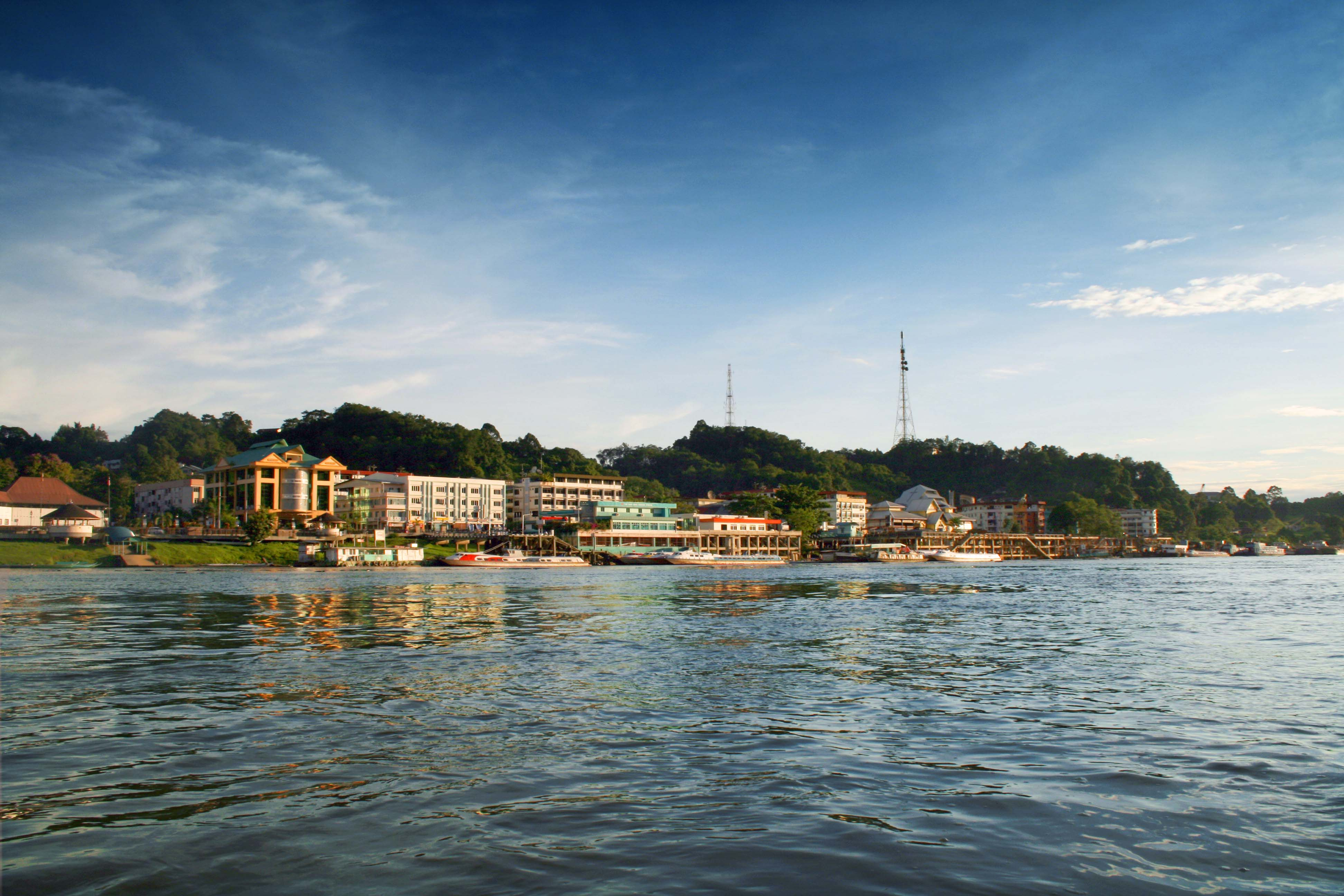
- Kapit town

- Seal

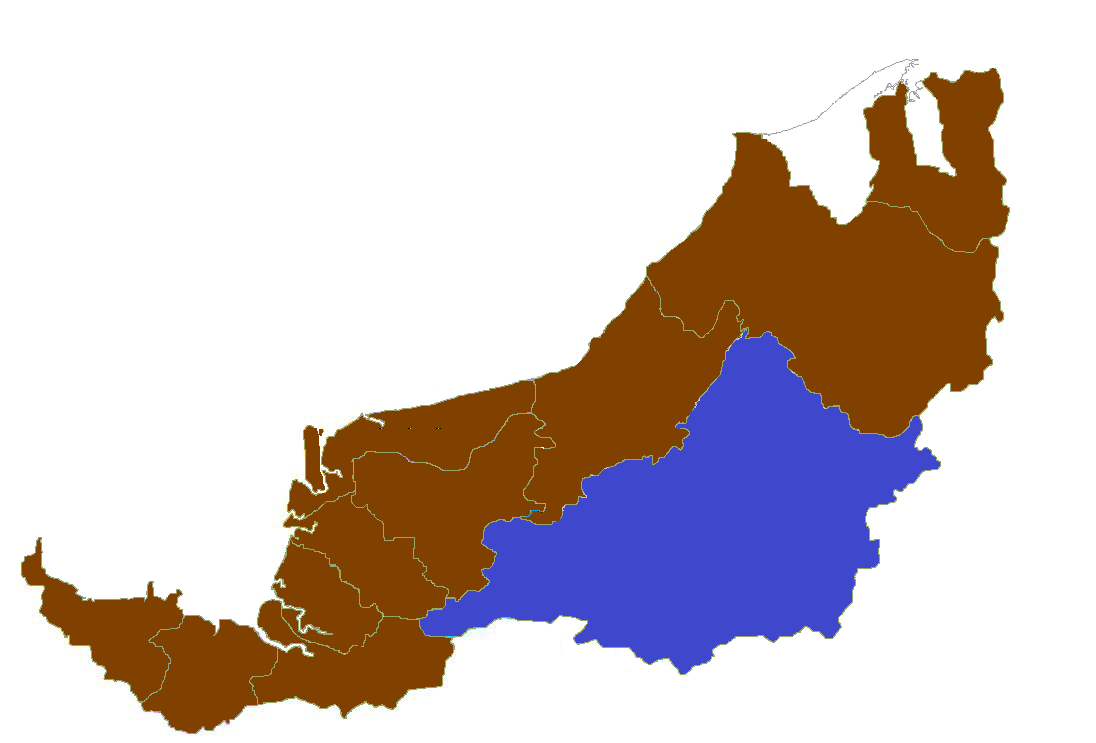
- Division Office location: Kapit

Government
  - Body: Majlis Daerah Kapit (MDK)

Area
  - Total: 38,934 km^{2} (15,033 sq mi)

Population (2020)
  - Total: 134,800
  - Density: 3.462/km^{2} (8.967/sq mi)
- Resident: Nyurak Keti
- License plate prefix: QP

Kapit Division (Malay: Bahagian Kapit), formed on 2 April 1973, is one of the twelve administrative divisions in Sarawak, Malaysia. It has a total area of 38,934 km^{2} (15,033 mi^{2}), and is the largest of the administrative divisions of Sarawak.

Its population (year 2020 census) was 134,800. Ethnically, the population of Kapit Division was 68% Iban, 19.1% Orang Ulu (Kenyah, Kayan, Penan etc.), 7% Chinese, 3.4% Malay, 1.3% Melanau, and 0.3% Bidayuh, and 0.1% other.

Kapit Division consists of four districts (Kapit, Song, Belaga, Bukit Mabong) and two sub-districts (Nanga Merit and Sungai Asap).

Some 86% of the land area is held in forest reserve. The economy is largely agricultural, based on forestry, oil palm, paddy, rubber, banana, and pepper. Other natural resources include coal. The Bakun Dam is based partly in Kapit Division.

== Administration ==
=== Members of Parliament ===
Parliament	Member of Parliament	Party
P215 Kapit	YB Datuk Alexander Nanta Linggi	GPS (PBB)
P216 Hulu Rajang	YB Datuk Wilson Ugak Kumbong	GPS (PRS)
