= Tanjung Kidurong =

Malaysian town

Coordinates: 3.2610°N 113.0857°E

Tanjung Kidurong, known as simply Kidurong, is a port township in Bintulu District, Sarawak, Malaysia. Approximately 15 minutes from the centre of Bintulu, Kidurong functions as the main industrial core of the Bintulu area. The MLNG Complex, which is the largest single gas manufacturing complex in the world, is in Kidurong. Shell and Murphy are among the other oil and gas multinationals that operate in the Kidurong Industrial Estate. The oil and gas industry in the Kidurong Industrial Area since the 1980s has brought along an expatriate community, who also live in Kidurong, notably around Tamam Matahari and MLNG Housing. This has also led to a higher price of homes in Kidurong, compared to the other suburbs in Bintulu town.

There are informal settlements formed by squatters in Sungai Plan and Pasir Putih.

The Kidurong Area is serviced by two secondary schools; SMK Kidurong and SMK Assyakirin. A small international school, Kidurong International School, serves the expatriate community of the area. Bintulu Airport is 20 minutes away, while the Bintulu Port, through which the liquefied gas produced by MLNG Complex is exported, is also n the area.
