= Bintulu =

Coastal town on Borneo island, Sarawak, Malaysia

- Town and district capital
- Bandar Bintulu; Bintulu Town
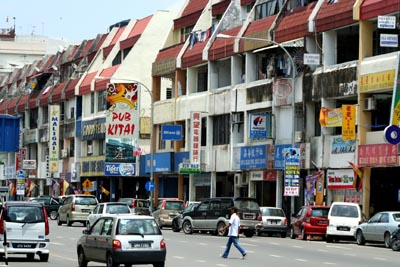
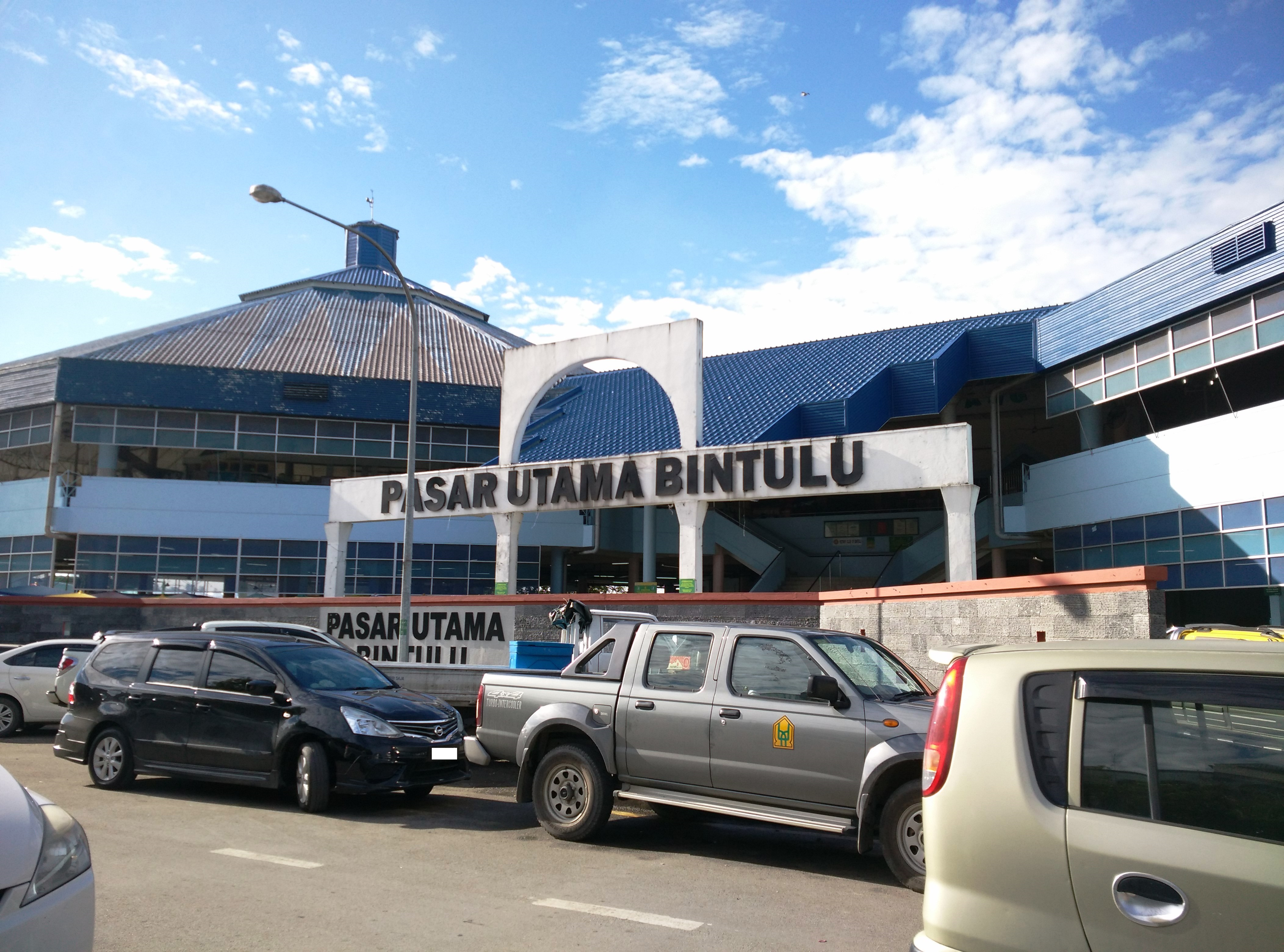
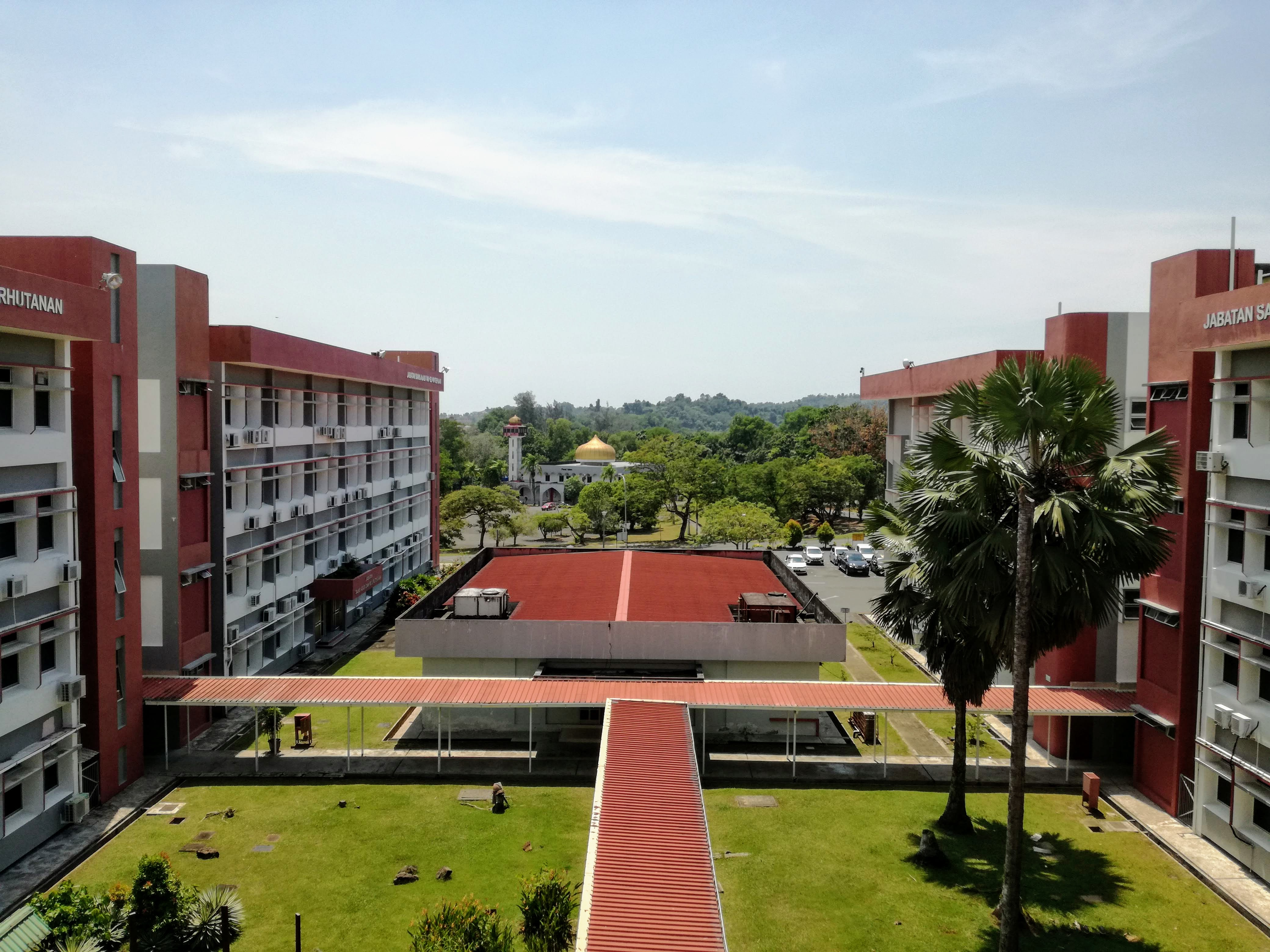
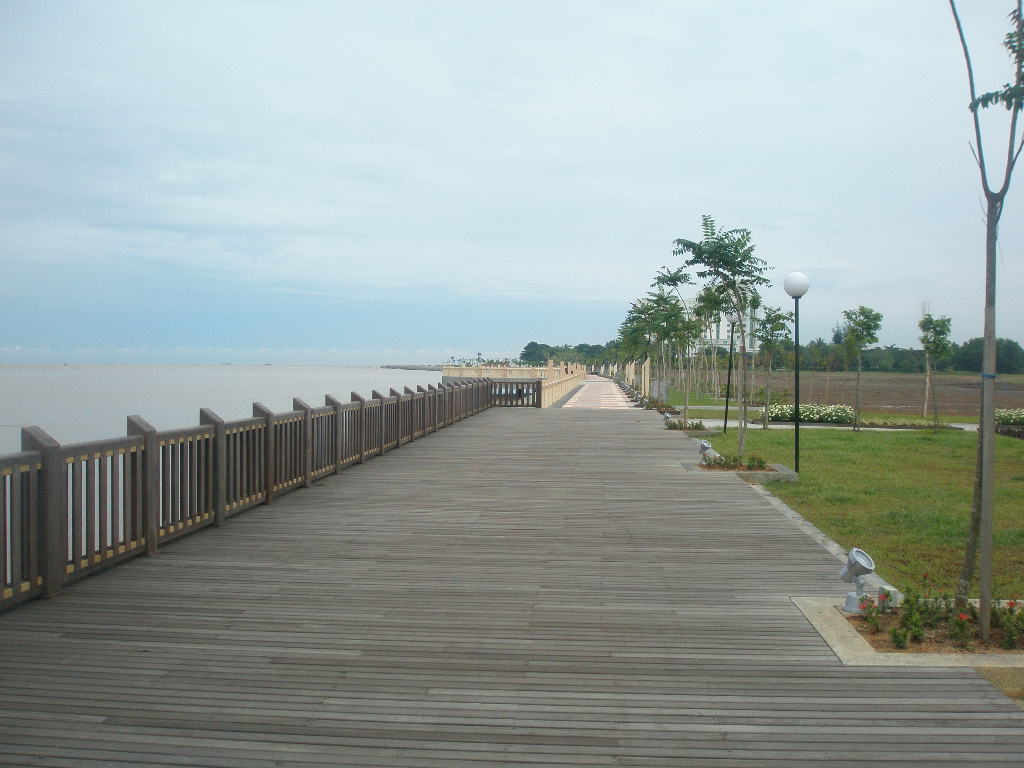
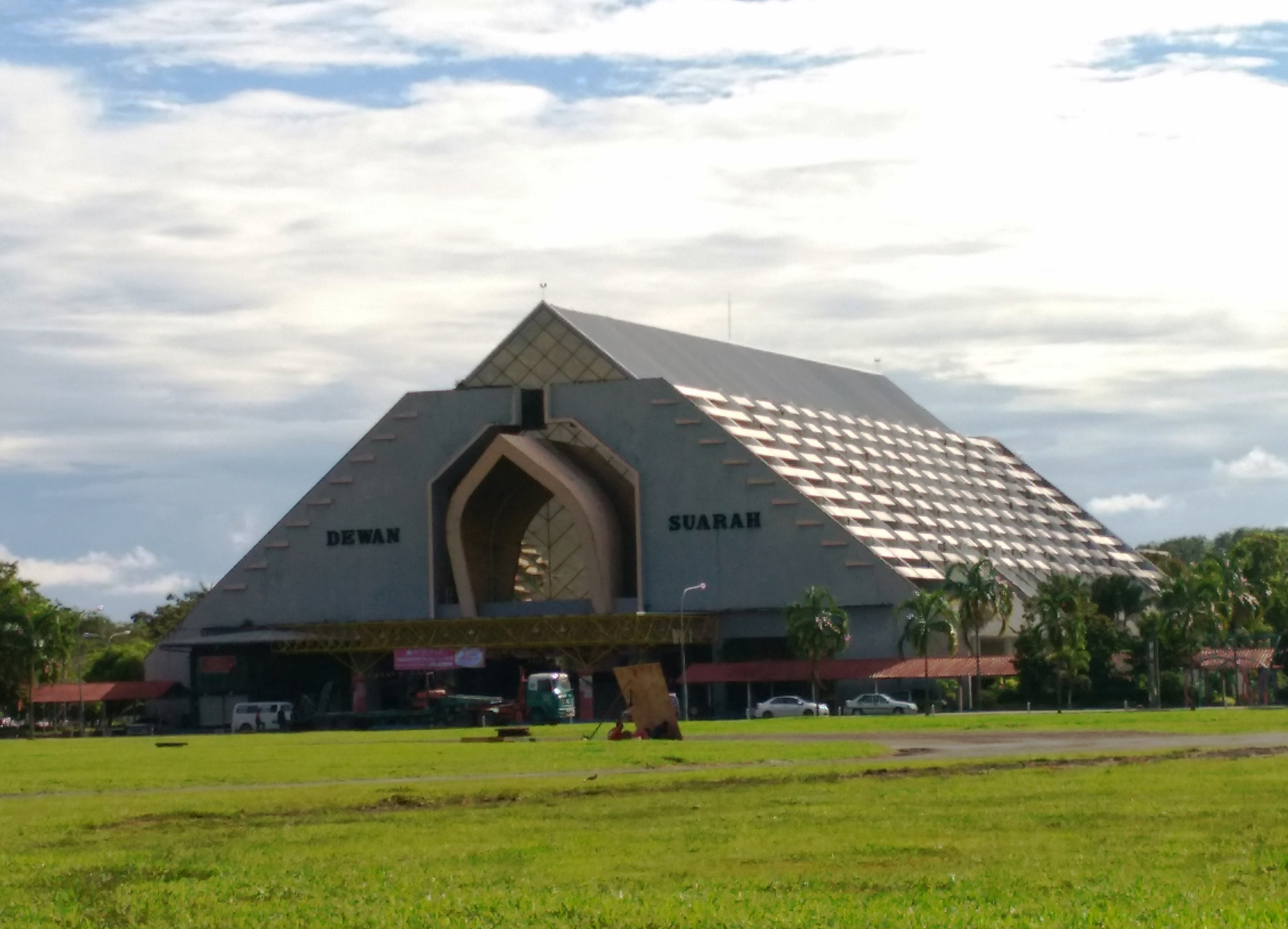
- From top, left to right: Downtown area, the Central Market, UPMKB, Coastal Promenade, and the Civic Center.

- Bintulu Development Authority
- Nickname: "Energy Town of Sarawak"
- Interactive map of Bintulu
- Bintulu in Sarawak Bintulu (Malaysia) Bintulu (Southeast Asia) Bintulu (Asia)
- Coordinates: 03°10′24″N 113°02′36″E
- Country: Malaysia
- State: Sarawak
- Division: Bintulu
- District: Bintulu
- Settled by James Brooke: 1862
- Formation of BDA: 8 July 1978

Government
  - Type: Municipal council
  - Body: Bintulu Development Authority
  - General Manager: Rodziah Haji Morshidi

Area
  - Bintulu Town: 237.12 km^{2} (91.55 sq mi)
- Elevation: 8 m (26 ft)
- Lowest elevation: 0 m (0 ft)

Population (2010)
  - Bintulu town: 114,058
  - Local authority area: 212,994
- Time zone: UTC+8 (MST)
  - Summer (DST): UTC+8 (Not observed)
- Postal code: 97xxx
- Area code(s): +6086 (landline only)
- Vehicle registration: QT (for all vehicles except taxis); HQ (for taxis only)
- Website: www.bda.gov.my

Bintulu is a coastal town on the island of Borneo in the central region of Sarawak, Malaysia. Bintulu is located 610 kilometres (380 miles) northeast of Kuching, 216 kilometres (134 miles) northeast of Sibu, and 200 kilometres (120 miles) southwest of Miri. With a population of 114,058 as of 2010, Bintulu is the capital of the Bintulu District, Bintulu Division of Sarawak, Malaysia.

The name of Bintulu was derived from the local native language "Mentu Ulau" (picking heads). Bintulu was a small fishing village within the Bruneian Empire prior to annexation by Rajah James Brooke in 1861. Brooke later built a fort there in 1862. In 1867, the first General Council meeting (now Sarawak State Legislative Assembly) was convened in Bintulu. It is the earliest state legislature system in Malaysia. The construction of the earliest airstrip in Bintulu began in 1934 but was halted in 1938 due to financial difficulties. During World War II, the airstrip was heavily bombed by Allied forces. The British later rebuilt the airstrip, and it became fully operational in 1955. The old airport was replaced by a new airport in 2002. Bintulu remained a fishing village until 1969 when oil and gas reserves were discovered off the coast. Since then, Bintulu has become the centre of energy-intensive industries such as a Malaysia LNG plant, a Shell Middle Distillate Synthesis plant, and a Bintulu combined cycle power plant. The economy has also expanded into oil palm and forest plantations, palm oil processing, wood-waste processing, and cement manufacturing. The port of Bintulu is the busiest in Sarawak. The town is also a gateway to the Samalaju Industrial Park.

Among the tourist attractions in Bintulu are Similajau National Park, Tumbina Park, Tanjung Batu beach, Jepak village, Kuan Yin Tong temple, Assyakirin mosque, Council Negri monument, Tamu Bintulu, and Pasar Utama markets. The Borneo International Kite Festival is held annually in the town.

== Etymology ==
During the 16th century, Bintulu was named "River de Burulu" by Portuguese cartographers. There are several legends surrounding the name Bintulu. During the Brooke dynasty, the indigenous practised headhunting to maintain their social status in the community. They threw the heads into the Kemena River, after which the heads had to be collected from the river. The practice of collecting the heads was known as "Metuk Ulow" (picking heads) in the local native language. Another story relates that two Iban warriors named Berengik and Jaleb built houses along the river. They and their followers frequently carried out preservation of severed heads near a small river stream branching off from Sebezaw River because the river bank was flat and wide. Therefore, the small river stream was named "Metuk Ulow" river. Outsiders who came to Bintulu subsequently pronounced the name as "Mentulau", and later the name evolved into "Bentulu" and, finally, "Bintulu".

== History ==
=== Brooke dynasty ===
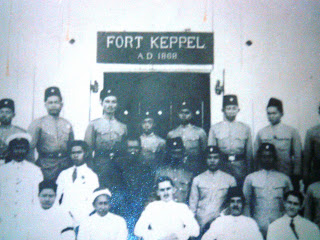
Fort Keppel in 1868

James Brooke was appointed the White Rajah of Sarawak (now known as Kuching) by the Bruneian Empire in 1841. In 1861, the Sultanate of Brunei ceded the Bintulu region to Brooke. Bintulu was a small settlement at that time. A wooden fort named Fort Keppel was built in the village, named after Sir Henry Keppel, who was a close friend of the Rajah James and Charles Brooke. Sir Henry Keppel was responsible for crushing the Dayak piracy in the Saribas between 1840 and 1850. Meanwhile, Charles Brooke was a nephew of James Brooke and would later become the latter's successor as the second Rajah of Sarawak. Odoardo Beccari, an Italian botanist, visited Bintulu in 1867. On 4 August, he started his journey on a gunboat named "Heartsease", which was to send $6,000 to Brunei for concessions being made to James Brooke in the Mukah and Bintulu regions. He went to Labuan before coming back to Bintulu. He dropped off at Kemena River on 13 August 1867. His observations of the village were recorded as follows:

The fort of Bintulu which was built entirely of wood, was in somewhat ruinous condition. It stood nearly on the sea-shore, and just behind it, at a distance of few paces, the primeval forests commenced...Some chinamen had settled at the vicinity of the fort and had built a small bazaar; but the village is chiefly formed by the houses of the Melanau beyond the Chinese kampong (village). These Melanaus used to live further up the river, but since the construction of the fort, and the installation of an officer of the Rajah near the mouth of the river, they came to settle near the sea – a thing they would never have dared to do in former days for fear of the attacks of the Lanun pirates and Dayak pirates.

— Reported by Odoardo Beccari in 1904

The houses of the Melanau people were built in rows on both sides of the Kemena River, mostly furnished by Nipah and Sago palms. Each house had its own shed projection into the entrance of the river, which was used for the processing of Sago palms. On 8 September 1867, the first Sarawak General Council meeting (now Sarawak State Legislative Assembly) took place here. It was made up of 21 elected local community members (five British officers and 16 Malay and Melanau local chiefs). The council was formed by Raja Muda Charles Brooke under orders from Rajah James Brooke. The council is the oldest state legislative assembly in Malaysia.

=== Japanese occupation ===
During World War II, Rajah Charles Vyner Brooke ordered the construction of airstrips in Kuching, Oya, Mukah, Bintulu, and Miri. Construction of the Bintulu airstrip was started in 1934 under the direction of C. W. Bailey, a Works and Building Inspector for the British Royal Air Force (RAF). All the airstrips were completed except for the Bintulu airstrip, where construction was discontinued in October 1938 due to financial reasons. Japanese forces landed in Miri on 16 December 1941. Sarawak fell into Japanese hands when they conquered Kuching on 24 December 1941. When the Japanese invaded Sarawak, Charles Vyner Brooke already left for Sydney (Australia) before the attack while his officers were captured by the Japanese and interned at the Batu Lintang camp. During the Japanese occupation, the Japanese used the airstrip for military purposes. However, the airstrip was heavily bombed by Allied forces. The British began reconstruction of the airstrip after the war; during the project many unexploded bombs were unearthed.

On 5 September 1942, Japanese Field Marshal Prince Maida (前田利为) boarded a plane from Kuching to Labuan to officiate an airport that bears his name. However, he never arrived. One month later, the plane was found to have crashed off the coast of Tanjung Batu, Bintulu. The cause of the plane crash was not known. The Japanese later set up a wooden pole memorial made up of Belian wood in Bintulu. The wooden pole was later taken back to Japan by the family of Prince Maida.

Chinese sawmill owners at Sibu and Bintulu were instructed by the Japanese to produce timber for repairs at oil fields and ship building. During the Japanese occupation, sawmills at Bintulu produced a total of 4,000 tons of sawn timber.

=== Post-war period ===
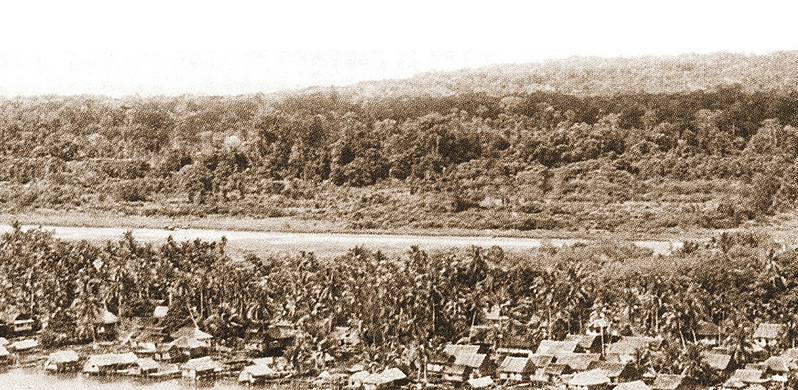
Bintulu fishing village in the 1950s. Behind the fishing village was the airstrip.

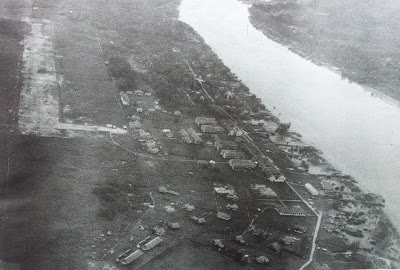
Aerial view of Bintulu town in 1950s. Bintulu airstrip can be seen at the top left corner of the image.

In the 1950s, major economic activities in Bintulu were the timber extraction industry, fishing, and Sago processing. In the 1960s, Bintulu was still a small fishing village, with a population of 5,000. No roads were constructed in Bintulu until 1969 when the first untarred road was built to connect Bintulu to Miri. The first bus that serviced the Miri–Bintulu route was owned by Majlis Amanah Rakyat (MARA). The MARA bus line was an initiative by the Malaysian federal government to provide public transportation for the people. The Iban villagers paid the bus driver with "vegetables, chickens, bamboo shoots, and other items". Before 1960, Bintulu was connected to Kuching by sea through a ship named "Swee Joo". After 1960, the ship "Chin Chin" was added to the route. It took around 36 to 48 hours to reach Bintulu from Kuching, depending on the sea conditions. Due to lack of food supplies from Kuching, the villagers had to make do with limited food, and several villagers resorted to hunting in the jungles to supplement the food supply.

In 1960 there were only three primary schools in Bintulu. These schools provided classes until Primary 3 level. There were no secondary schools. Villagers could pursue their secondary school studies at either Miri or Kuching by using small boats as there were no roads connecting Bintulu to either Miri or Kuching. Bintulu Government Secondary School was opened in 1964. In 1967 Bintulu celebrated the first 100 years of the Council Negri meeting (Sarawak State Legislative Assembly). A stone monument was built in front of a government rice storeroom to commemorate the event. Bintulu was a sub-district of Miri Division in the 1970s. The sub-district was upgraded into a district in 1987.

=== Discovery of oil and gas reserves ===
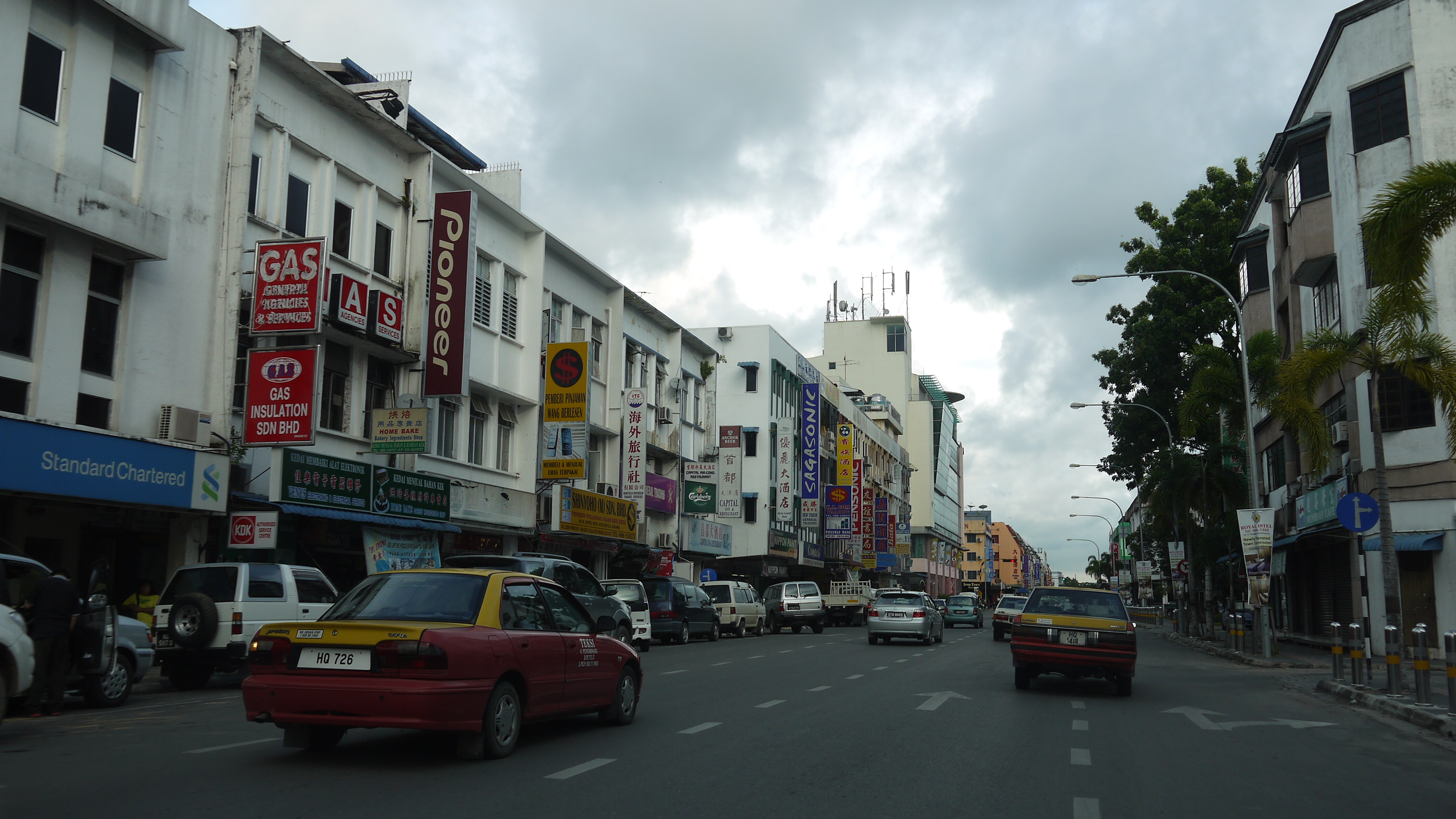
Bintulu downtown in 2011

Large reserves of natural gas were discovered off the coast of Bintulu in 1969. Following this, a feasibility study was done in 1975, and Tanjung Kidurong was found to be a suitable site for a deep-water port. On 14 June 1978, Malaysia LNG Sdn Bhd (MLNG Satu) was established by Petronas, a Malaysian national oil and gas company for Liquefied Natural Gas (LNG) processing at Bintulu. On 8 July 1978, the Bintulu Development Authority (BDA) was established by the Sarawak state government for infrastructure development and to promote industrial investment in the area. On 15 August 1981, the Bintulu Port Authority was established at Tanjung Kidurong, starting operation on 1 January 1983. Since the establishment of Sarawak Corridor of Renewable Energy (SCORE) in 2008, Bintulu become the gateway to Samalajau Industrial Park, which is located 62 kilometres (39 mi) away from Bintulu. The industrial park is a centre of heavy, energy-intensive industry. Among the companies that started their operations in the industrial park are Tokuyama Malaysia Sdn Bhd (now replaced by OCI Malaysia Sdn Bhd), Press Metal Bintulu Sdn Bhd, and OM Materials Sdn Bhd.

Rural–urban migration is significant in Bintulu because of greater job availability in the town. Since 2007, new residents have started several squatter areas in Bintulu due to inability to find affordable housing, around Kidurong Industrial estate and Sungai Sebatang. To address the issue, several low-cost housing projects were initiated by BDA and Sarawak state government to relocate the squatters. The state government planned to achieve zero squatters status by the year 2020. Bintulu also saw the rise in the number of residential and commercial properties such as double-storeyed terraced houses, terraced shopoffices, Kidurong Commercial Centre, and Time Square Shopping Mall. Residential properties has shown a 20% price increase from 2011 to 2013.

== Governance ==
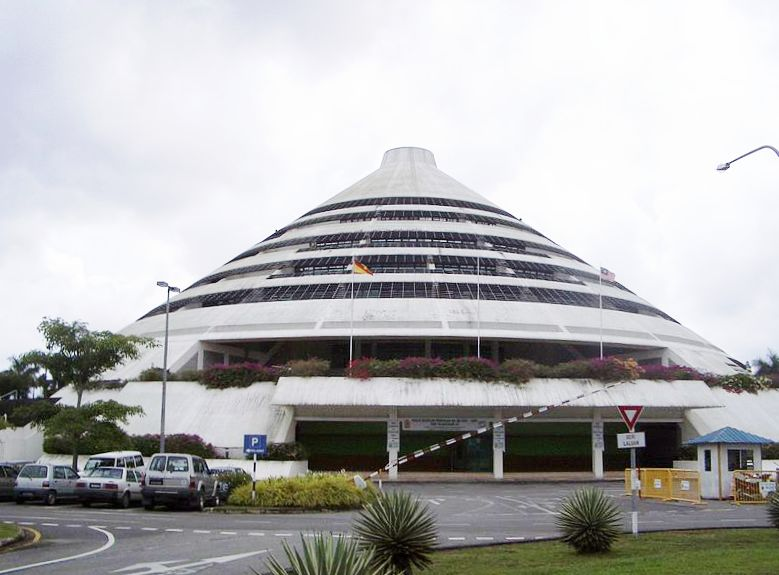
BDA head office in the town of Bintulu

Administrative districts of Bintulu Division

Bintulu is represented by Bintulu (P. 217), Hulu Rajang (P. 216) and the Selangau (P. 214) parliamentary seats in the Parliament of Malaysia. The town is also represented by a few state assembly seats namely – Jepak, Kakus, Belaga, Kidurong (later it was split into two separate seats namely Tanjong Batu and Samalaju since 2016), Murum and Kemena – in the Sarawak State Legislative Assembly.

=== Local authorities ===
Since 1978 the town of Bintulu has been administered by the Bintulu Development Authority (BDA), with offices located along Jalan Tanjung Kidurong. The town is located within the boundary of Bintulu District, with a population of 183,402 and a total area of 7,220.40 square kilometres (2,787.81 sq mi). Bintulu Division was formerly a Bintulu District under the jurisdiction of Miri Division. The former Bintulu District was upgraded to Bintulu Division on 1 January 1987. At the same time, Bintulu sub-district was upgraded to the present-day Bintulu District. Both the Bintulu Resident and District offices are located inside Wisma Residen, Pisang Keling Street, Bintulu.

== Geography ==
Bintulu is located 610 kilometres (380 mi) northeast of Kuching 216 kilometres (134 mi) northeast of Sibu, and 200 kilometres (120 mi) southwest of Miri. Bintulu is located near the mouth of the Kemena River, in the coastal region of central Sarawak. Geology of the coastal area was formed during the Pleistocene period; silt, clay, and gravel can be found here. Geological formation from the Oligocene period is found in the inland area, which contains limestone, siltstone, and sandstone. The soil is generally soft.

=== Climate ===
There are two monsoon seasons in the Bintulu: the northeast monsoon (November to March) and the southwest monsoon (May to September). The calm period between these two monsoons is known as the transitional period. In the coastal region, maximum rainfall occurs in the month of January, while minimal rainfall occurs from the period June to August. Rainfall is more evenly distributed in the inland areas. The annual rainfall of the Bintulu region is about 3,750 mm (148 in) annually. The mean daily hours of sunshine at Bintulu is about 5.0 to 5.5 hours. Bintulu receives on average 14 to 15 mJ/m^{2} of radiation throughout the year. Bintulu's relative humidity is 85%.

Climate data for Bintulu (1991–2020 normals, extremes 1915–present)
Month	Jan	Feb	Mar	Apr	May	Jun	Jul	Aug	Sep	Oct	Nov	Dec	Year
Record high °C (°F)	34.1 (93.4)	33.7 (92.7)	35.3 (95.5)	36.0 (96.8)	35.9 (96.6)	36.0 (96.8)	35.8 (96.4)	36.3 (97.3)	36.0 (96.8)	34.6 (94.3)	34.0 (93.2)	34.7 (94.5)	36.3 (97.3)
Mean daily maximum °C (°F)	30.4 (86.7)	30.4 (86.7)	31.3 (88.3)	31.9 (89.4)	32.2 (90.0)	32.1 (89.8)	32.1 (89.8)	32.1 (89.8)	31.7 (89.1)	31.3 (88.3)	31.1 (88.0)	30.9 (87.6)	31.5 (88.7)
Daily mean °C (°F)	26.3 (79.3)	26.4 (79.5)	26.9 (80.4)	27.3 (81.1)	27.5 (81.5)	27.3 (81.1)	27.2 (81.0)	27.1 (80.8)	26.9 (80.4)	26.7 (80.1)	26.7 (80.1)	26.5 (79.7)	26.9 (80.4)
Mean daily minimum °C (°F)	23.6 (74.5)	23.6 (74.5)	23.8 (74.8)	24.0 (75.2)	24.2 (75.6)	23.9 (75.0)	23.7 (74.7)	23.7 (74.7)	23.6 (74.5)	23.5 (74.3)	23.6 (74.5)	23.6 (74.5)	23.8 (74.8)
Record low °C (°F)	18.9 (66.0)	19.9 (67.8)	19.4 (66.9)	21.1 (70.0)	21.1 (70.0)	20.0 (68.0)	20.6 (69.1)	20.6 (69.1)	20.6 (69.1)	21.1 (70.0)	19.4 (66.9)	20.0 (68.0)	18.9 (66.0)
Average precipitation mm (inches)	460.0 (18.11)	299.5 (11.79)	278.5 (10.96)	272.7 (10.74)	232.8 (9.17)	245.4 (9.66)	247.6 (9.75)	298.0 (11.73)	302.8 (11.92)	372.1 (14.65)	425.0 (16.73)	453.6 (17.86)	3,888 (153.07)
Average precipitation days (≥ 1.0 mm)	18.0	14.0	12.9	15.1	13.3	13.6	13.3	13.3	15.3	18.3	20.2	20.4	187.7
Average relative humidity (%)	87	87	85	85	85	85	84	85	85	86	85	87	85
Mean monthly sunshine hours	142.1	151.0	178.1	192.9	204.3	201.3	203.5	186.7	171.2	171.2	164.8	163.6	2,130.7
Source 1: World Meteorological Organization
Source 2: Deutscher Wetterdienst (humidity, 1930–1969), Meteo Climat (record highs and lows)

== Demographics ==
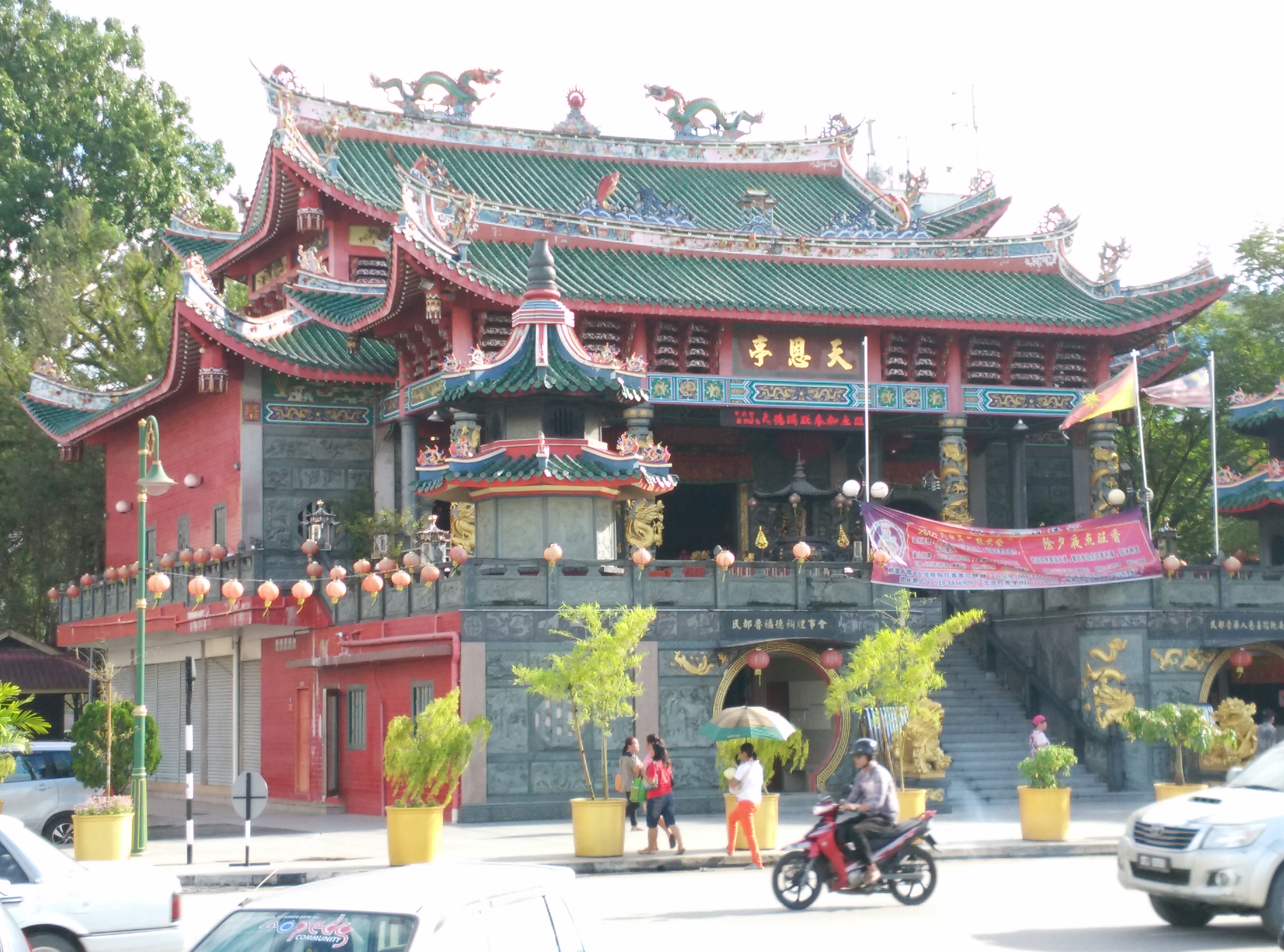
Bintulu Tua Pek Kong Temple

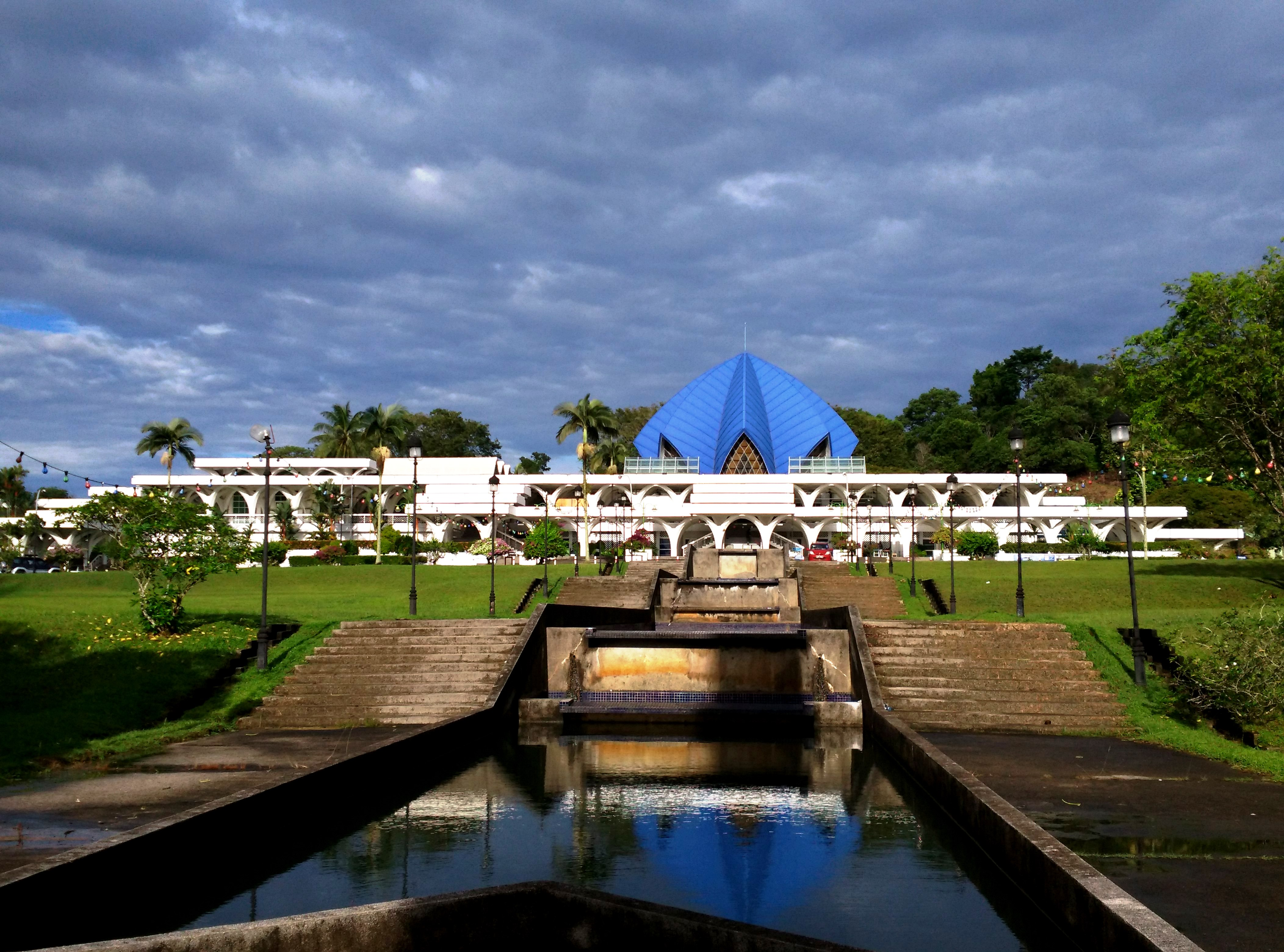
Assyakirin Mosque, Bintulu

The growth of Bintulu's population is shown below:

Year	1960	1970	1980	1991	2000	2010
Total population	5,000	14,000	42,812	51,862	102,671	114,058

The issue of gangsters in Bintulu was first raised in 2007 by the member of parliament (MP) for Bintulu. The gangsters may have run businesses related to illegal logging, controlling the prices of diesel, eggs, fertiliser and gas cylinders. Bintulu police have been cracking down on gangster activities in the town. Unscrupulous businessmen who seek cheap labour have caused a rise in the number of illegal immigrants in Bintulu. The number may have reached 50,000 in 2009. Bintulu immigration department has performed several operations to deport illegal immigrants back to their home country.

=== Ethnicity ===
Bintulu District Ethnic Statistic
Total Population	Malay	Iban	Bidayuh	Melanau	Other Bumiputera	Chinese	Indian	Other Non-Bumiputera	Non-Citizen
183,402	20,036	72,809	2,225	17,029	11,421	30,831	430	728	27,893

Ethnic composition in Bintulu
Ethnic group	Percent
Iban	39.6%
Chinese	16.8%
Non-Citizen	15.2%
Malay	10.9%
Melanau	9.2%
Other Bumiputera	6.2%
Others	0.6%

As of the 2010 Malaysian census, the population of the town of Bintulu is 114,058. Indigenous people accounted for the largest proportion of the town population (61.2%, 69,782), followed by Chinese (25.0%, 28,512), Non-Malaysians (13.1%, 14,939), and Indians (0.3%, 319). Among the indigenous groups, there are Iban (32,992), Malay (14,945), Melanau (14,179), Bidayuh (1,598), and other indigenous tribes (6,068). According to government sources, there are 229 Iban longhouses in the Bintulu District. The Ibans moved into Kemena and Tatau basins in the mid-19th and early 20th century with permission of the Brooke government. Other indigenous tribes that form the minority are Kayan, Kenyah, and Punan. The Chinese in Bintulu are mainly composed of dialect groups such as Hakka, Fuzhou, and Teochews. The Chinese have been living in the town of Tatau since the era of Bruneian Empire. Later, Fuzhou Chinese from Sibu moved in, dominating the timber and plantation businesses in Bintulu. There is also a large number of foreigners working there. Most of them come from Britain, Australia, the Netherlands, Germany, South Africa, New Zealand, Japan, China, the United States, and Indonesia.

=== Languages ===
While Malay and English are the official languages of Sarawak; Iban is widely spoken there. Local ethnic languages and Chinese dialects are spoken by the respective ethnic groups. Standard Chinese is also spoken by ethnic Chinese in Bintulu. Bintulu is spoken by communities living along the Kemena River, with 4,200 native speakers. These speakers are now recognised as part of the Melanau ethnic group, where their main language is Malay. Bintulu is classified as one of the endangered languages in Sarawak because of the isolated usage of the language in a small community.

=== Religion ===
The majority of the Bintulu population are adherents of Christian denominations due to Christian missionaries operating during the Brooke dynasty; followed by Islam, Buddhism, and Hinduism. Among the notable places of worship in Bintulu are the Bintulu Mosque (Masjid Assyakirin), Masjid Jepak, Tua Pek Kong Temple, Eng Kwang Methodist Church, and St. Thomas Church. The respective religious groups are free to hold processions in the town.

== Economy ==
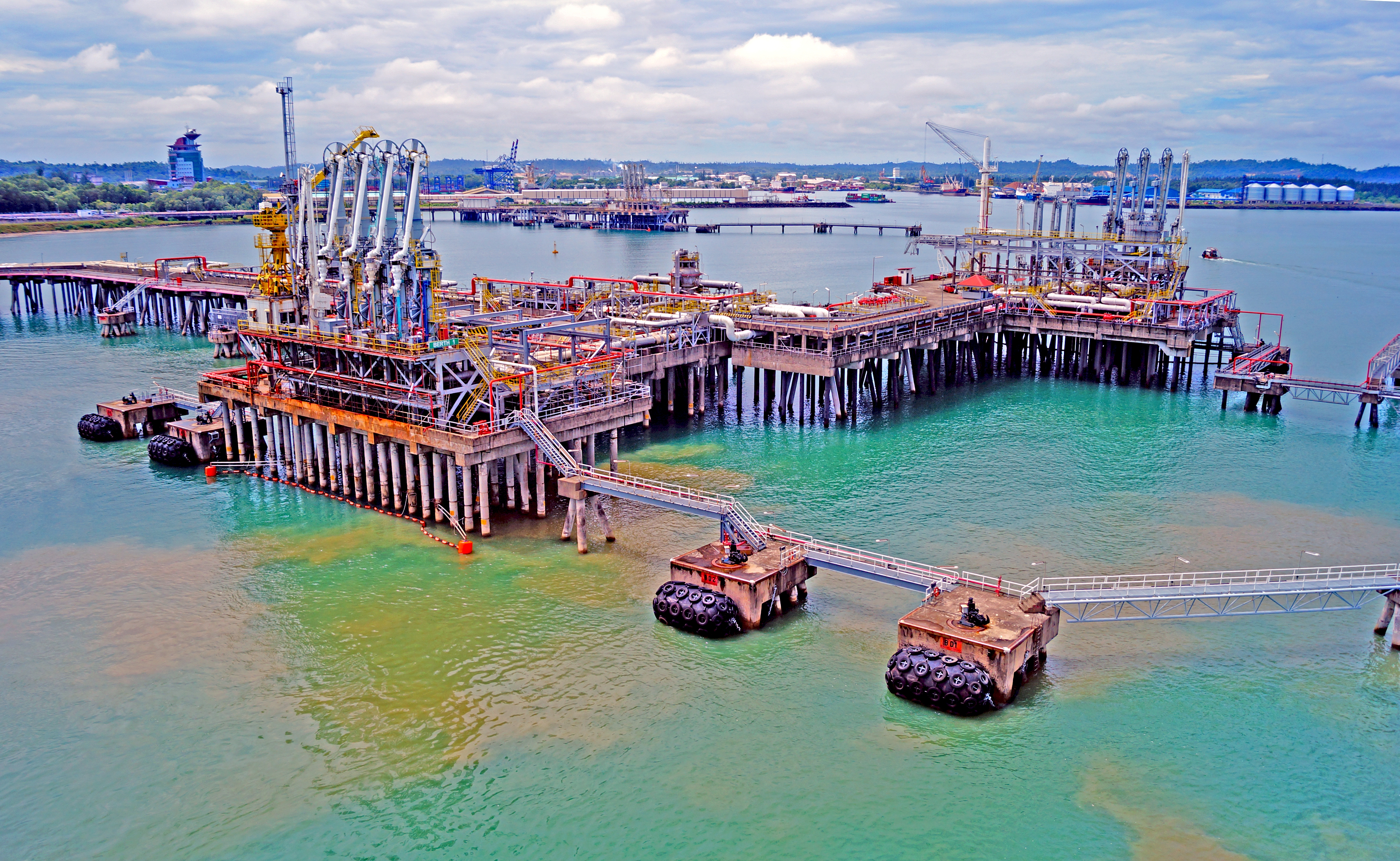
The Bintulu LNG port

There are five industrial estates in Bintulu. They are: Kemena Industrial Estate (for wood-based industries), Jepak Industries Estate (wood-based industries), Kidurong Industrial Area (for medium and light industries), Kidurong Light Industrial Estate (medium and light industries), and Bintulu Light Industrial Estate (light industry).

=== Oil and gas ===
Malaysia LNG is a Liquefied Natural Gas (LNG) manufacturing complex located in Bintulu that currently contains eight LNG trains with a ninth one currently under construction. The complex was built by the Malaysian national oil and gas company, Petronas. The manufacturing complex has a production capacity of 25.7 million tonnes per annum. Petronas is also planning to open Floating LNG (FLNG) offshore Bintulu, which is used specifically to harvest natural gas from small and isolated gas fields. Transportation of natural gas from Kimanis in the neighbouring state of Sabah, to the LNG complex at Bintulu is facilitated by a 512-kilometre (318 mi) pipeline known as the "Sabah–Sarawak Gas Pipeline". Currently, 45% of Malaysian natural gas is found at Central Luconia off the coast of Bintulu. The largest importers of Malaysia LNG productions are Japan (62%), Korea (17%), Taiwan (12%), and China (9%).

The Sarawak Shell Bintulu Plant (SSBP), formerly known as Bintulu Crude Oil Terminal (BCOT), was established in 1979. It consists of three crude oil storage tanks, each with a capacity of 410,000 barrels. It has three major areas of operation: Crude Oil Operations, Condensate Stabilisation, and Gas Sales Facilities. Royal Dutch Shell started to establish the world's first Shell Middle Distillate Synthesis plant (Shell MDS) in 1993. It is also known as Bintulu Gas-To-Liquid plant (Bintulu GTL). The plant has a production capacity of 14,770 barrels per day with a total investment of over US$1 billion as of the year 2010. The plant is staffed with 380 people, of whom 93% are Malaysians, with 80% of the staff coming from Sarawak.

=== Wood-based industries and plantations ===
Since the opening up of the Bintulu–Miri road in the 1970s, large-scale plantations of oil palm and cocoa has been developed in rural areas of Bintulu Division. Currently, there are 57,740 hectares (577.4 km^{2} (223 sq mi)) of oil palm, 2,000 hectares (200 km^{2} (77 sq mi)) of Rattan, and 815 hectares (8.15 km^{2} (3 sq mi)) of pepper plantations.

The first Bintulu palm oil refinery, Bintulu Edible Oil Sdn Bhd, was established in June 1991. Bintulu currently has four palm oil refineries: Bintulu Edible Oils Sdn Bhd (operated under PGEO Group, a subsidiary of Wilmar International), Sime Darby Austral Edible Oil Sdn Bhd, Kirana Palm Oil Refinery Sdn Bhd, and Sarawak Oil Palm Bhd. However, as of 2015, Wilmar no longer buys raw palm oil produced from cleared forests and peat swamps in Sarawak because of environmental concerns.

The Bintulu Division has been designated as a Planted Forests Zone (PFZ) by the Sarawak state government since 1998. As of 30 June 2011, a total of 124,618 hectares (1,246.18 km^{2} (481 sq mi)) has been planted with acacia trees. Other trees that are planned for plantations are kelampayan, engkabang, durian, batai, eucalyptus, and rubber trees. Sarawak Planted Forest Sdn Bhd, a company wholly owned by the Sarawak state government, has been granted a licence to replant forests for 60 years. However, the company has been suffering financial losses from 2009 to 2011.

There are three mills in Bintulu that process wood-waste products. Two are Medium-density fibreboard (MDF) plants and the third is a charcoal briquette plant, with a total installed capacity of 246,000 cubic metres (8,700,000 cu ft) per year. MDF plants utilise wood waste purchased from sawmills and plywood mills in the Bintulu area and occasionally from the Tanjung Manis timber processing zone located at the mouth of the Rajang River. Synthetic resins, which are required to hold wood dust together, constituted 20% of the total production cost of the wood panel products. MDF plants in Bintulu are operated by Daiken Sarawak Sdn Bhd, which was founded on 15 February 1994. The briquette plant is operated by Cipta Briquette Sdn Bhd. A glue/adhesive factory in Bintulu is owned by Bintulu Adhesive & Chemicals Sdn Bhd. It produces urea formaldehyde resin and phenol formaldehyde resin for plywood and chipboard manufacturing at Kemena Industrial Estate. Urea precondensate is also produced to supply ASEAN Bintulu Fertiliser plant.

=== Others ===
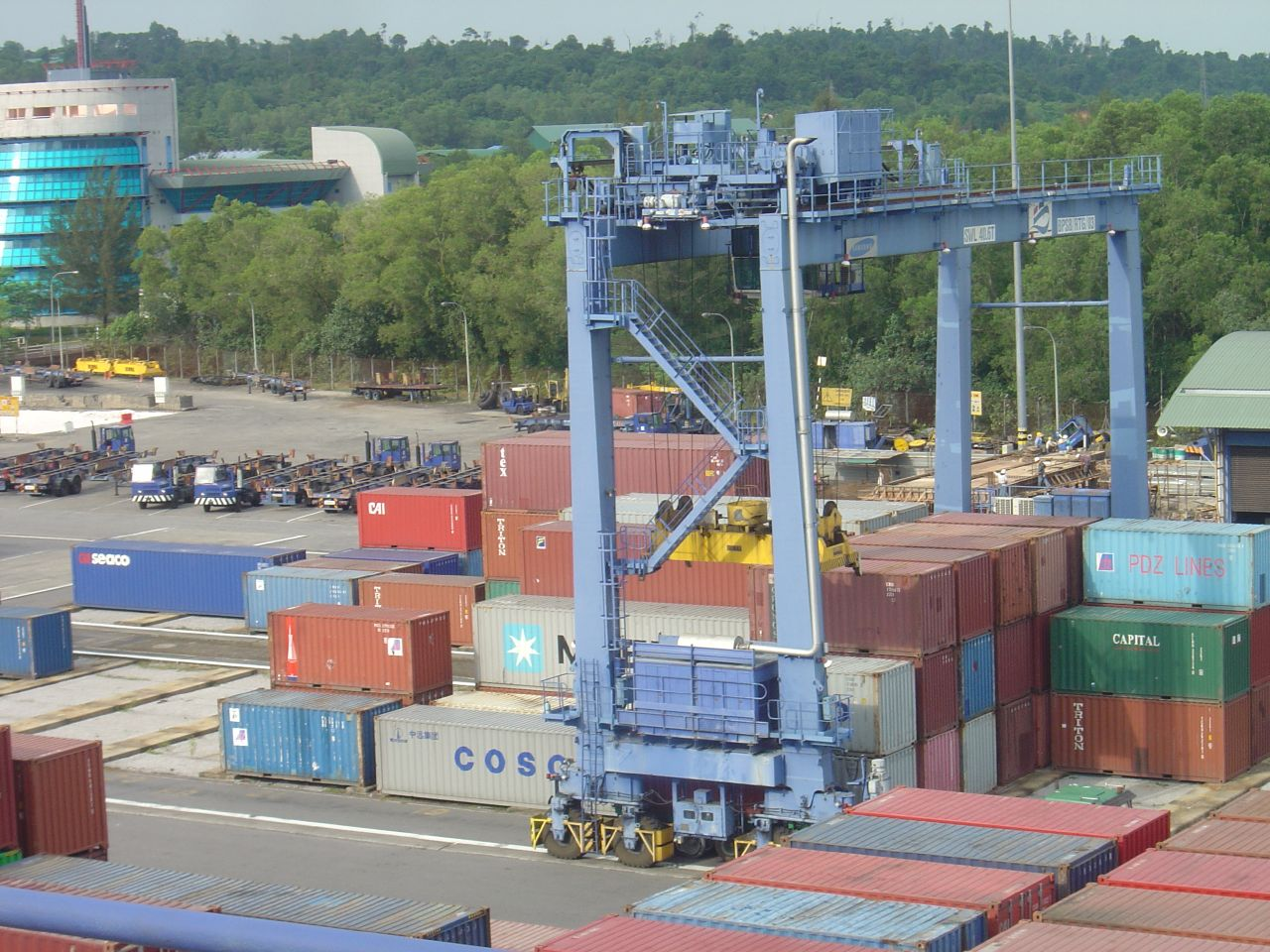
Rubber tyred gantry crane at Bintulu International Container Terminal

The Bintulu Port Authority was established in 1981. It started port operation in 1983 at Tanjung Kidurong. Following a privatisation exercise, Bintulu Port Sdn Bhd (BPSB) was founded on 23 December 1992 and commenced operation on 1 January 1993. BPA is currently responsible for regulatory exercises and security of the port. Meanwhile, BPSB is responsible for cargo handling at the Bintulu International Container Terminal (BICT). The port also provides Vessel traffic service to shipping vessels. The annual total cargo throughput is 45.4 million tonnes, consisting of 58% LNG and 42% non-LNG products. As of 31 December 2014, it generated a total revenue of RM 552.3 million per year. Bintulu Port is the busiest port in Sarawak.

The ASEAN Bintulu Fertiliser plant is the anhydrous ammonia and granular plant operated by ASEAN Bintulu Fertiliser Sdn Bhd (ABF), which is partly owned by Petronas. The company was formed on 6 December 1980. The plant started operation on 1 October 1985. It is also one of the largest granular urea plants in Asia. It is a joint venture by five ASEAN countries: Malaysia (63.5% shares), Thailand (13%), Indonesia (13%), Vietnam (9.5%), and Singapore (1%).

Cahya Mata Sarawak Berhad (CMSB), one of the largest publicly traded companies in Sarawak, set up a cement plant in Bintulu at Kidurong Industrial Estate. The plant, staffed by 40 people, produces ordinary Portland cement and Portland blast furnace cement. It currently has a combined production capacity of 2.75 million MT (million tonnes).

The Bintulu combined cycle power plant was started in early 2010 with a capacity of 317 megawatts. The power plant is registered under the United Nations Clean Development Management (CDM) scheme as of 18 September 2010. The plant is built to ensure efficient use of energy and reduce green house gas emissions. It is the first CDM power plant in Malaysia, currently operated by Sarawak Power Generation Sdn Bhd (SPG), a wholly owned subsidiary of Sarawak Energy.

== Transportation ==
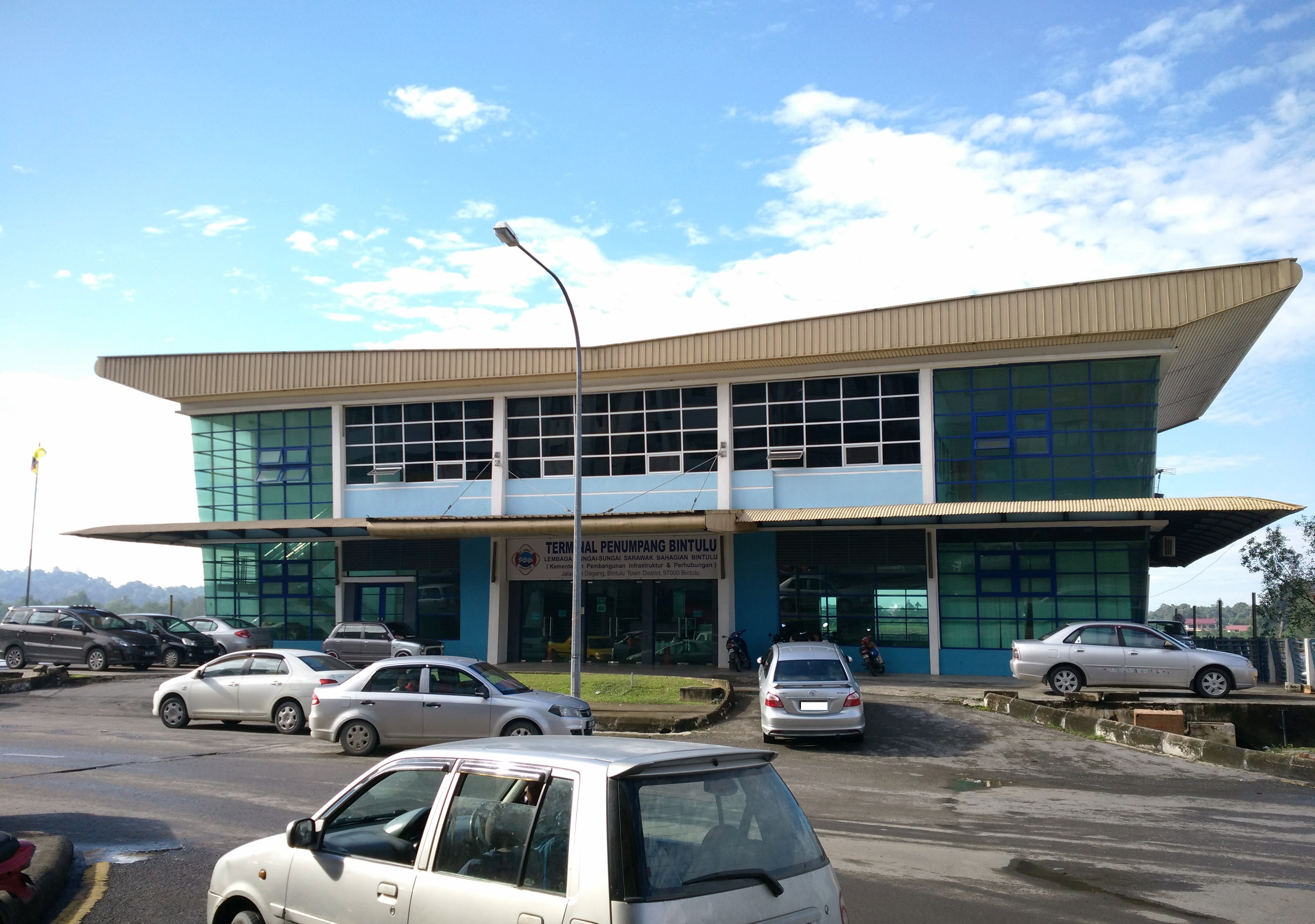
The Bintulu wharf terminal

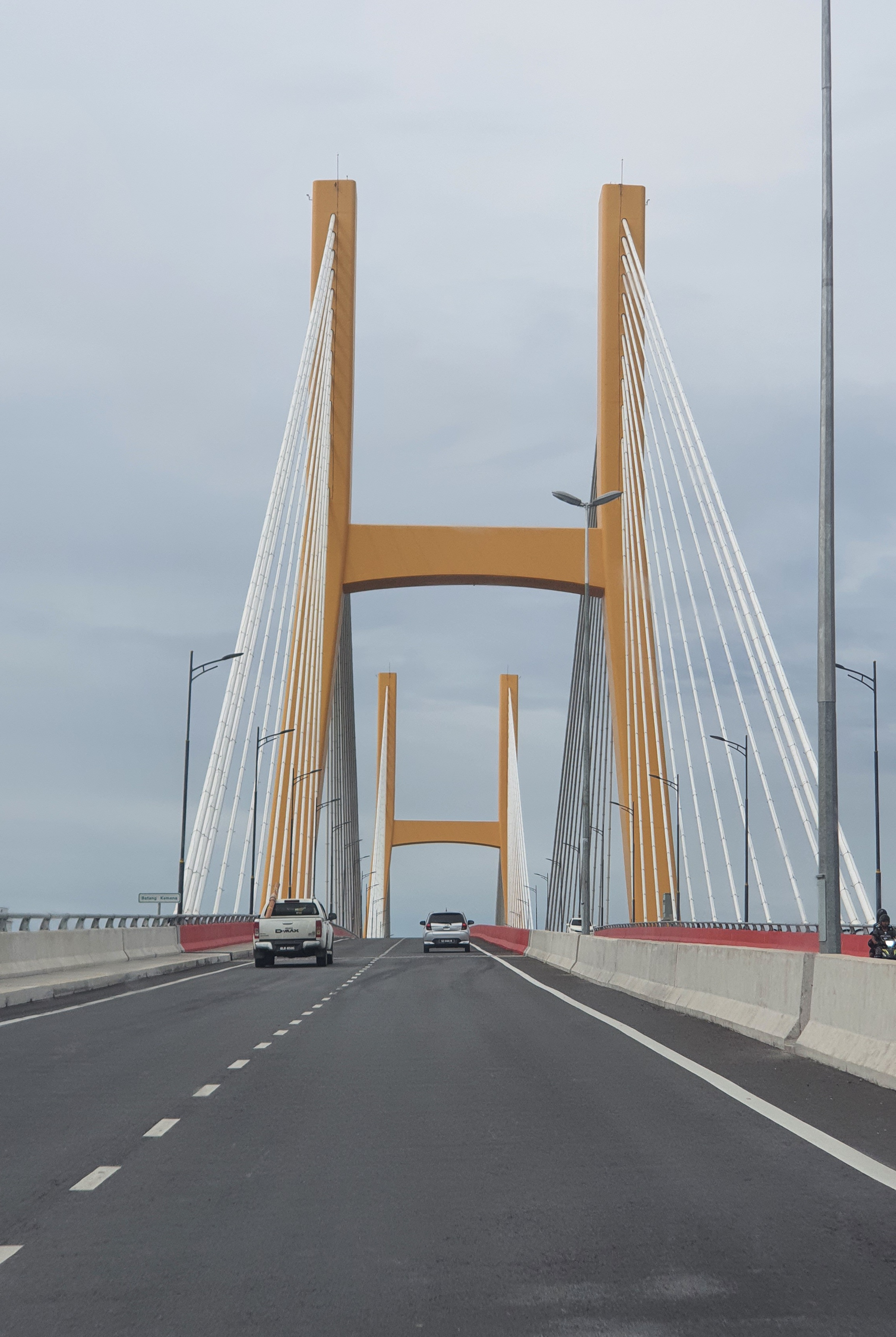
The new Bintulu-Jepak Bridge in Bintulu, Sarawak, opened in 2025.

=== Land ===
All roads in Bintulu are maintained by the Bintulu Development Authority (BDA). Bintulu is connected to Miri and Sibu by the Pan Borneo Highway. Bintulu is also connected to Mukah and Samalaju Industrial Park. Kemena Bridge crosses the Kemena River. It is the second bridge in Malaysia built using the incremental launch method. Keppel Road in Bintulu is named after a friend of James Brooke, Sir Henry Keppel.

=== Local Bus ===
Route No.	Operating Route	Operator	Remark
B5	Sungai Plan	CPL	
B8	Jambatan Kuala Tatau	CPL	Kuala Tatau-Kampung Jepak-Perumahan-Segan-Bintulu Airport-Industri Jepak-Pasar Tamu-Terminal Bas Parkcity
B9	Tatau	CPL	Tatau-Bintulu Airport-Industri Jepak-Batu 5-Medan Jaya-Pasar Tamu-Terminal Bas Parkcity
B10	Nyalau	CPL	Nyalau-Samalaju-Sungai Plan-Hospital-Sebauh-Medan Jaya-Pasar Tamu-Terminal Bas Parkcity

Bintulu has a long-distance bus station, located at Medan Jaya, 5 km (3 mi) northeast of the town centre. Among the areas served by the bus station are: Miri, Sibu, Kuching, Mukah, Sarikei, Oya, Dalat, Balingian, and Pontianak, Indonesia. The bus companies that serve the station are the Syarikat Baram Sdn. Bhd, MTC, Biaramas, and Suria bus lines. There are also buses that serve the town area. Taxi service is also available.

=== Air ===
The old Bintulu airport was built in 1955 in the town centre. On 19 December 2002, the airport was replaced by a new airport, which is located 23 km (14 mi) away from the town centre. The surroundings of the old airport were developed into commercial and residential projects while the runway is reserved for Bintulu International Kite Festival. The new airport has a runway measuring 2,745 m (9,006 ft), capable of handling planes as large as the Airbus A330. The airport currently serves three major airlines: Malaysia Airlines (MAS), Air Asia, and MASwings, connecting to domestic destinations such as: Sibu, Miri, Kuching, Kuala Lumpur, and Kota Kinabalu, and the first international destination, Singapore will start the direct flight since 26 December 2017.

=== Water ===
There is a wharf terminal at Bintulu that serves the rural areas of Bintulu Division. Among the destinations that can be reached by express boat from Bintulu are: Sebauh, Pandan, Labang, Tubau, and Binyo.

== Other utilities ==
=== Courts of law and legal enforcement ===
The current court complex is located at Pisang Emas Road. It comprises the High Court, the Sessions Court, and the Magistrate Court. Bintulu also has Syariah Subordinate Court, located at Tanjung Kidurong, whose area of jurisdiction covers Bintulu District and Tatau districts. The Bintulu central police station is located at Tun Hussein Onn Road, with other police stations located at Tanjung Kidurong, Tubau, and Sebauh. There is also a central prison in Bintulu, which doubles as a correctional centre.

=== Healthcare ===
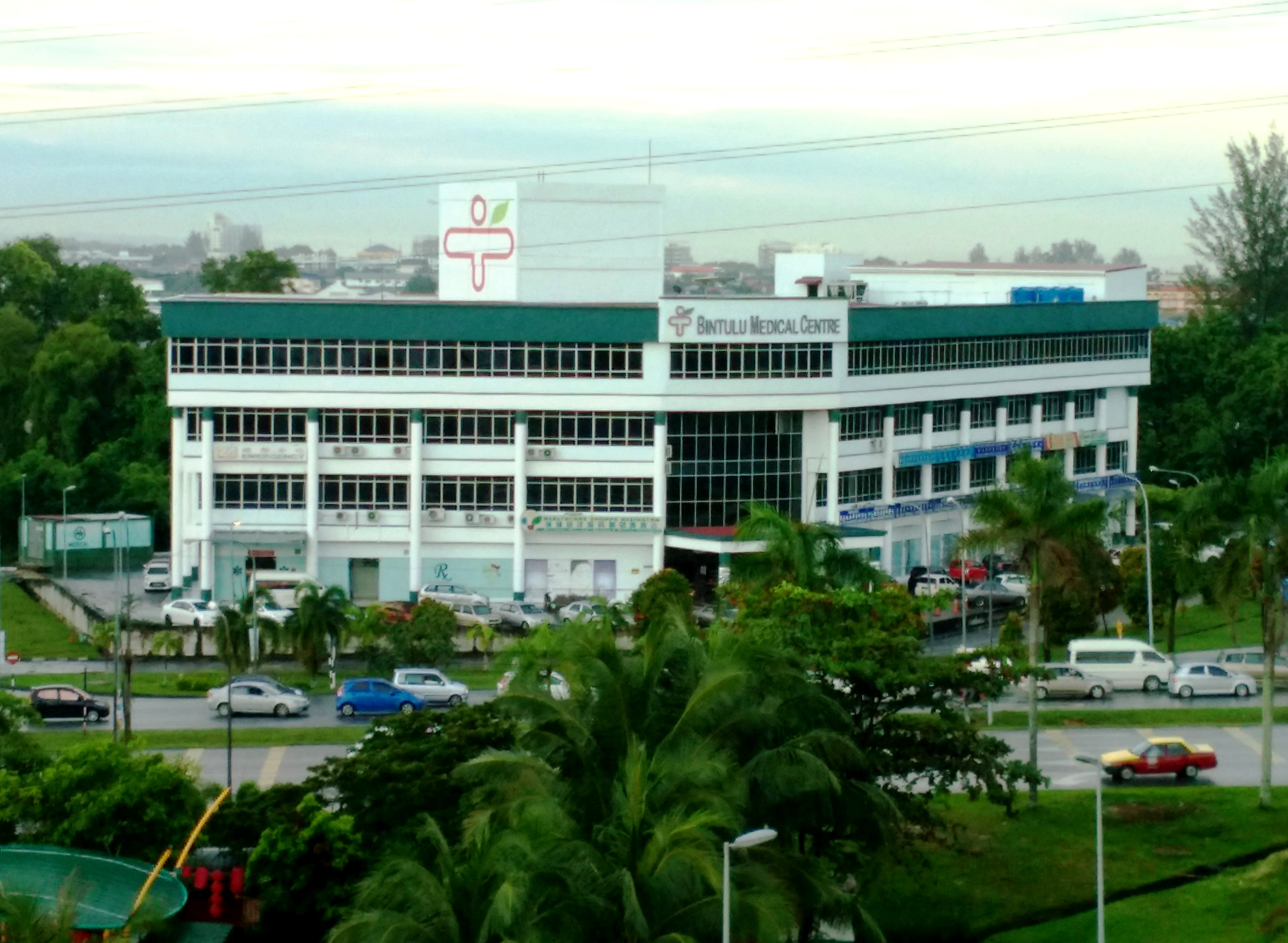
Bintulu Medical Centre

Bintulu Hospital started operation in 1968. It is located at Nyabau Road, 12 km (7.5 mi) from the town centre. Following renovations completed on 21 May 2000, the hospital is now equipped with 200 beds. As of 2011, the hospital provides speciality services in seven medical disciplines. Bintulu also has one polyclinic, Polyclinic Bintulu. There are two private hospitals in Bintulu: Kemena Pacific Hospital (formerly known as "Columbia Asia Hospital") and Bintulu Medical Centre.

=== Education ===
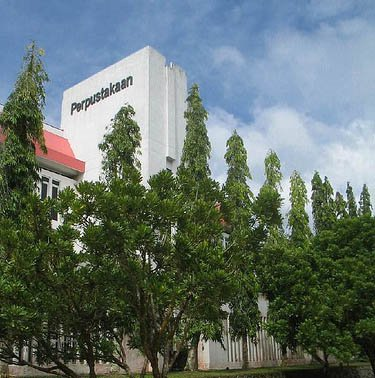
The UPM Bintulu Sarawak Campus main Library

There are about 50 primary and eight secondary schools in Bintulu. All the schools under the National Education System are managed by the Bintulu District Education Office. The oldest primary schools in Miri are St Anthony's Primary School (Roman Catholic Mission School), Chung Hua Primary School, and the Orang Kaya Mohammad Primary School, which were established in the early 1960s. The Bintulu Government Secondary School was built in 1964. It is now known as SMK Bintulu, the oldest secondary school in the town. Bintulu also has one Chinese independent school, Kai Dee Middle School (开智中学). The Shell Oil Company established the Kidurong International School in 1982 to meet the primary education needs of Shell employees' children. The school provides English National Curriculum (ENC) for literacy and numeracy and International Primary Curriculum (IPC) for other subjects.

UPM Bintulu Sarawak Campus was started as the National Resource Training Centre, Kuching, in 1974. The oldest campus in Sarawak, it was relocated to Bintulu in 1987 as a branch campus of the Universiti Pertanian Malaysia (UPM). The campus was closed down in 1992 before reopening in 2001 as Universiti Putra Malaysia (UPM). During this period of closure, the campus was used as the site for Maktab Perguruan Sains Bintulu (Bintulu Science Teachers' Training College) from 1994 to July 1999 when it was moved to Kota Samarahan as Institut Pendidikan Guru Kampus Tun Abdul Razak (Tun Abdul Razak Teachers' Training Institute Campus). The UPM campus is currently located 13 km (8 mi) away from the town centre, occupying 715 ha (1,767 acres), which can accommodate up to 2,200 students. This branch campus currently has only one faculty, the Faculty of Agriculture and Food Sciences, consisting of five academic departments. In 2015 UPM was ranked 41st in the UI-Greenmetric World University rankings. SEDAMAI College, established in November 1999, offers courses in business, information technology, language, and engineering.

There is also a technical school located 15 km (9 mi) away from the town, near Tanjung Kidurong, occupying 20 ha (49 acres) of land. The school was built in 1982 with a maximum capacity of 900 students. Among the courses offered are: automotive, mechanical and civil engineering, commerce, and fashion. Gulf Golden International Flying Academy (GGIFA), the first and only flying academy in Sarawak, was closed in 2012 due to financial difficulties.

=== Libraries ===
The first public library in Bintulu was built in 1971 by Bintulu District Council (BDC). In 1988 the library was demolished to make way for car parks. Books from the library were moved into the former BDC building. On 29 May 2000, the Bintulu Development Authority (BDA) public library was built near the Bintulu Civic Centre, which is 2 km (1.2 mi) from the town. The public library has three branches: at Kidurong, Tatau, and Sebauh.

== Culture and leisure ==
=== Attractions and recreational spots ===
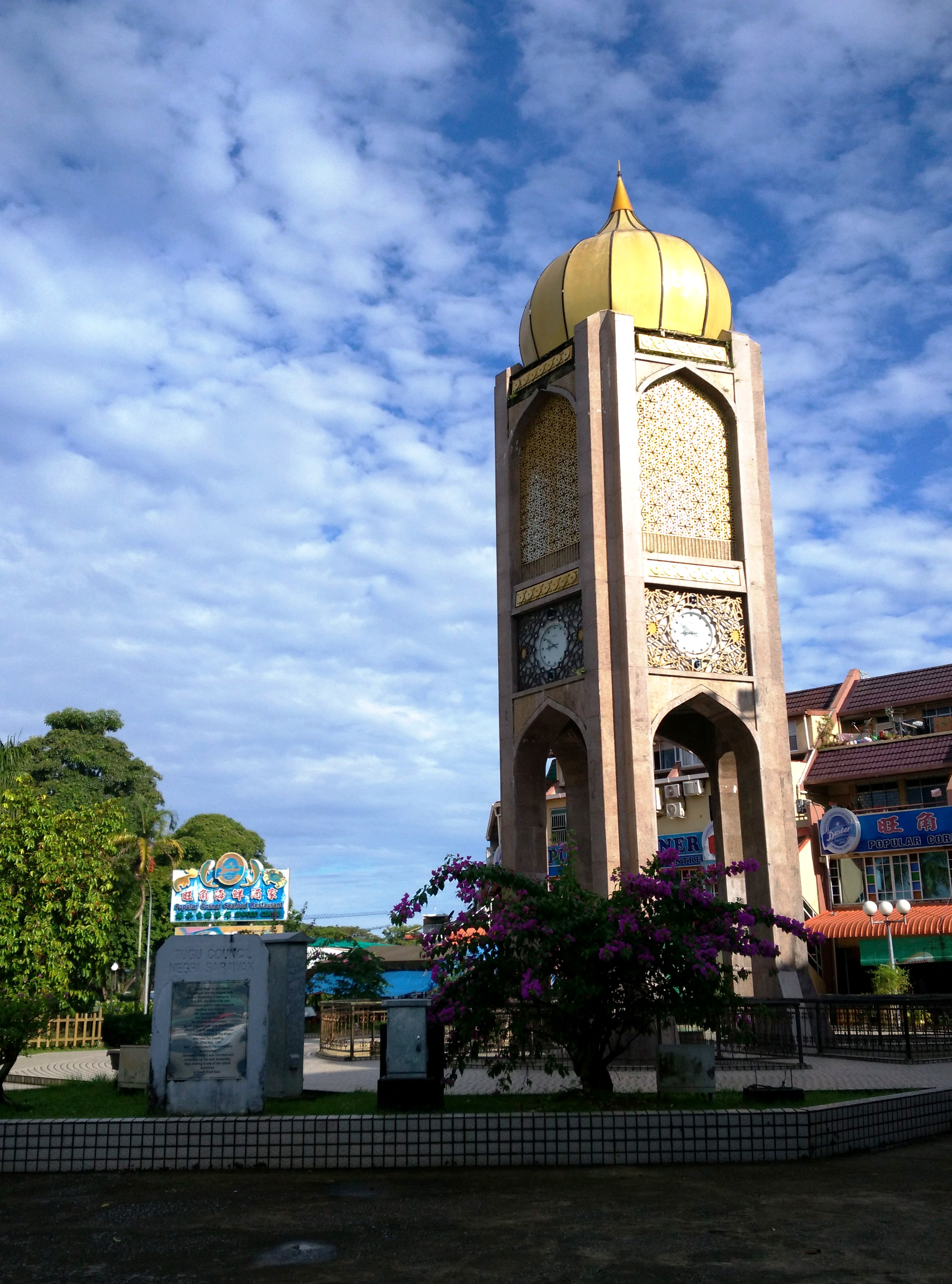
Council Negri Monument, Bintulu

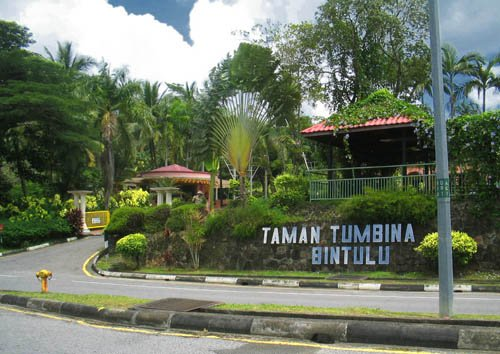
Taman Tumbina (Tumbina Park), Bintulu

==== Cultural ====
Kampung Jepak (Jepak village) is a Vaie fishing village in Bintulu located near Kemena River. Among the daily activities in this village are Sago processing, fish drying, and the manufacturing of Belacan, Cencaluk (salted shrimp), Terendak (Melanau headgear), and Tutop (a type of food cover). Kuan Yin Tong temple is located at KM2 Jalan Sultan Iskandar. It has a structural design with a rock garden courtyard, man-made waterfall, and dragon fencing. Assyakirin mosque, meaning "Gratefulness to God", has a man-made waterfall, a fountain, and a landscape planted with flowers. The Borneo International Kite Festival has been held yearly since 2005 at the old Bintulu airport runway. It usually lasts for four to five days in September.

==== Historical ====
In 1987 a clock tower and a fountain were erected at Council Negri Monument. A centenary stone that was erected in 1967 to commemorate the event is kept under the clock tower. The Bintulu Tua Pek Kong temple (near Tamu Bintulu) is believed to have been built in the 1890s to purge the town from evil spirits. The temple survived World War II, and was rebuilt after the discovery of oil and gas reserves offshore.

==== Leisure and conservation areas ====
Similajau National Park is located 30 km (19 mi) northeast of the town. The park was gazetted in 1976, covering an area of 8,996 ha (22,230 acres) (89.96 km^{2} (35 sq mi) with sandy beaches, rocky headlands, jungle streams, and forests. Other national parks that can be accessed along the Miri–Bintulu road are the Lambir Hills National Park and Niah National Park.

Tanjung Batu beach (Temasya beach) is located 3 km (1.9 mi) from the town centre. Meanwhile, Taman Tumbina (Tumbina Park) is located 4 km (2.5 mi) from the town centre. The park has a hornbill aviary, a butterfly garden, and a mini-zoo. Taman Tumbina has deer, a tiger, sunbears, as well as many different fish in their fish pond. Just down the road from Taman Tumbina there are hills where people go jungle tracking, jogging or walking.

==== Other attractions ====
Kidurong Tower is an observation tower located at Tanjung Kidurong. It offers a view of the Bintulu oil and gas facilities shortly after nightfall. Bintulu Promenade is a 3-kilometre (2 mi) walkway along the Bintulu coastline with the Kemena River mouth as its focal point. It has the observation points offering sunset views. There is also an 18-hole golf course at Bintulu.

==== Shopping ====
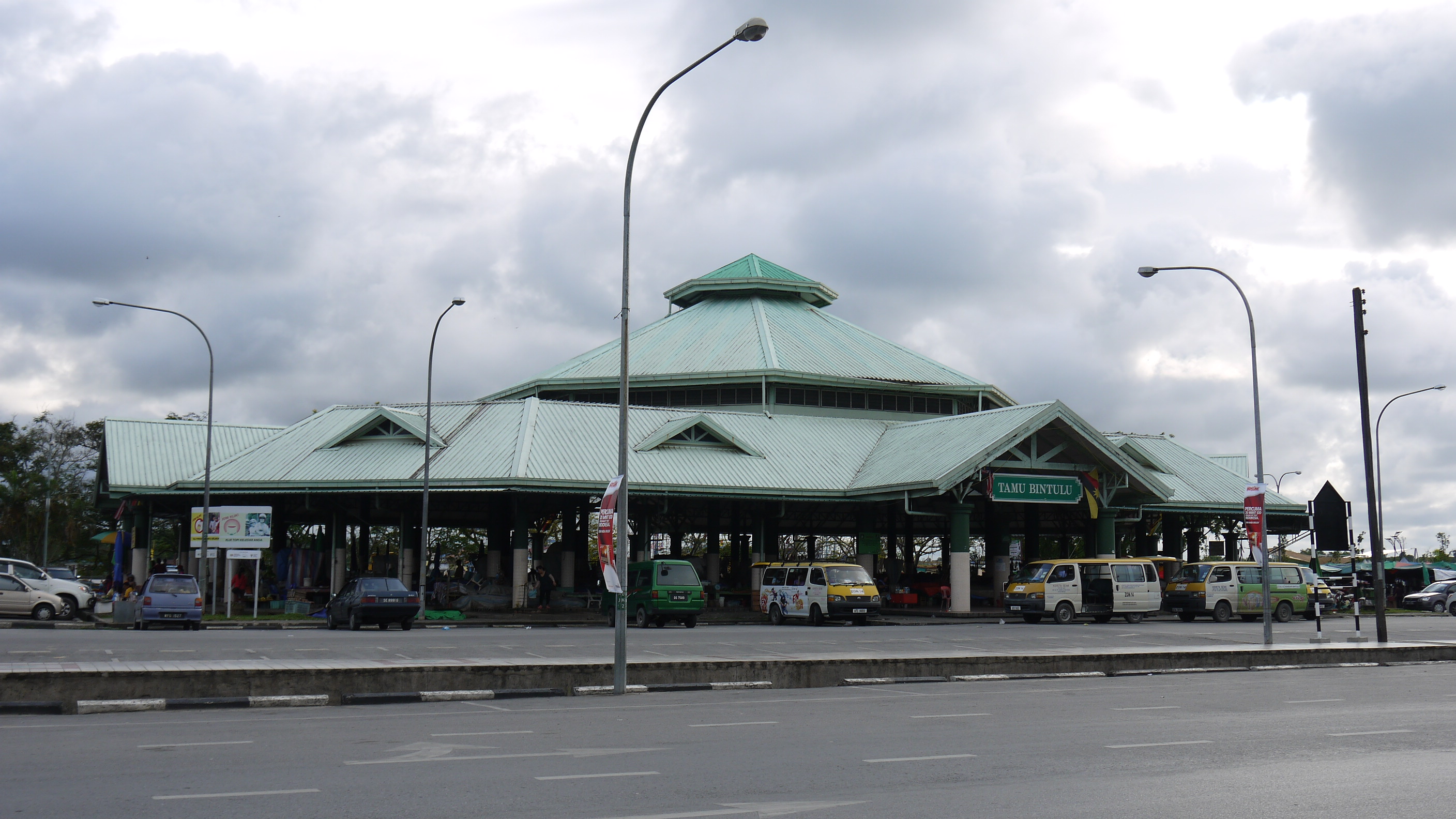
Tamu Bintulu

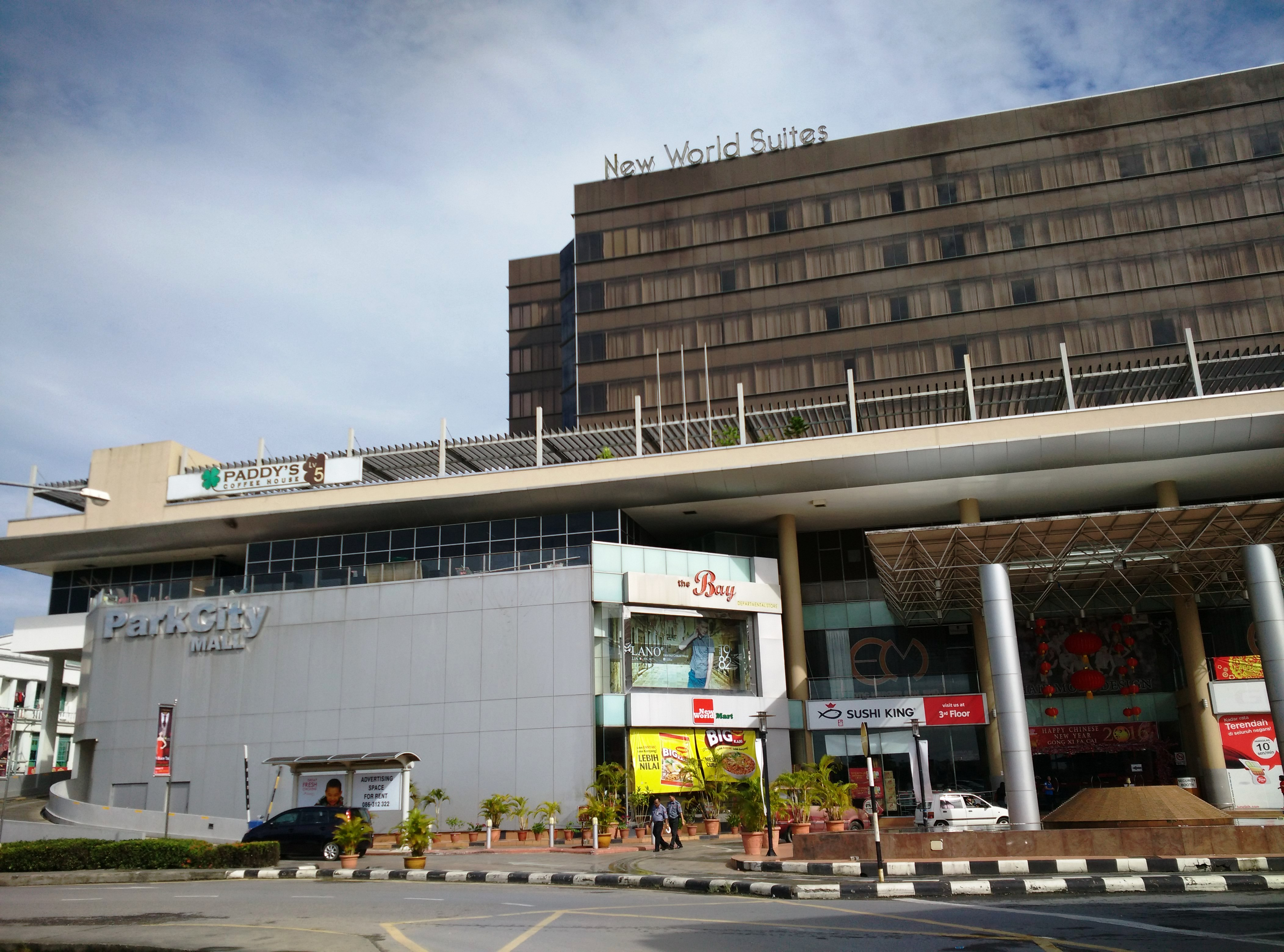
ParkCity Mall, Bintulu

There are several shopping malls in Bintulu: The Spring Bintulu, Bintulu Times Square, Commerce Square Bintulu, Bintulu Paragon, ParkCity Mall and City Point. The Spring Bintulu Mall is the latest attraction of list of malls in Bintulu. Furthermore, the construction of Bintulu Paragon at the old airport will boost Bintulu economy.

Tamu Bintulu and Pasar Utama are the two main markets in the town. Both places have a unique cone-shaped roof that symbolises the traditional Melanau headgear named Terendak. Tamu Bintulu offers items ranging from jungle produce to native home-made specialties such as Belacan. Meanwhile, Pasar Utama houses both wet market and dry market under one roof, providing fresh vegetables, fruits, fish, and dairy products. The first floor of Pasar Utama offers a variety of fast food such as Laksa, Kolok Mee, Jawa Mee, Pulut Panggang, ais batu campur, cendol and teh tarik. The Bintulu night market is located on Kampung Dagang road. There are over 150 stalls selling a variety of items such as garments, electric goods, vegetables, fruits, food and drinks.

== Notable people ==
- Ashley Lau, professional golfer. She is the first Sarawakian woman to turn professional in Dec 2022 and the first Sarawakian to top the national women's rankings.
