= University of Putra Malaysia Sarawak =

Coordinates: 3.2054677°N 113.0948562°E

- Universiti Putra Malaysia Sarawak (Malay)
- Other name: UPMS
- Former names: Universiti Pertanian Malaysia Sarawak (UPMS); Universiti Putra Malaysia Kampus Bintulu (UPMKB)
- Motto: Berilmu Berbakti
- Motto in English: With Knowledge We Serve
- Type: Public
- Established: November 2001
- Parent institution: Universiti Putra Malaysia
- Accreditation: Malaysian Qualifications Agency
- Academic affiliations: ASAIHL, AUN
- Chancellor: Sharafuddin of Selangor
- Vice-Chancellor: Ahmad Farhan Mohd Sadullah
- Provost: Shahrul Razid Sarbini
- Students: 1,500 (2019 data)
- Location: Bintulu, Sarawak, Malaysia
- Campus: 714 ha (1,760 acres); Rural
- Language: Malay; English
- Website: www.sarawak.upm.edu.my

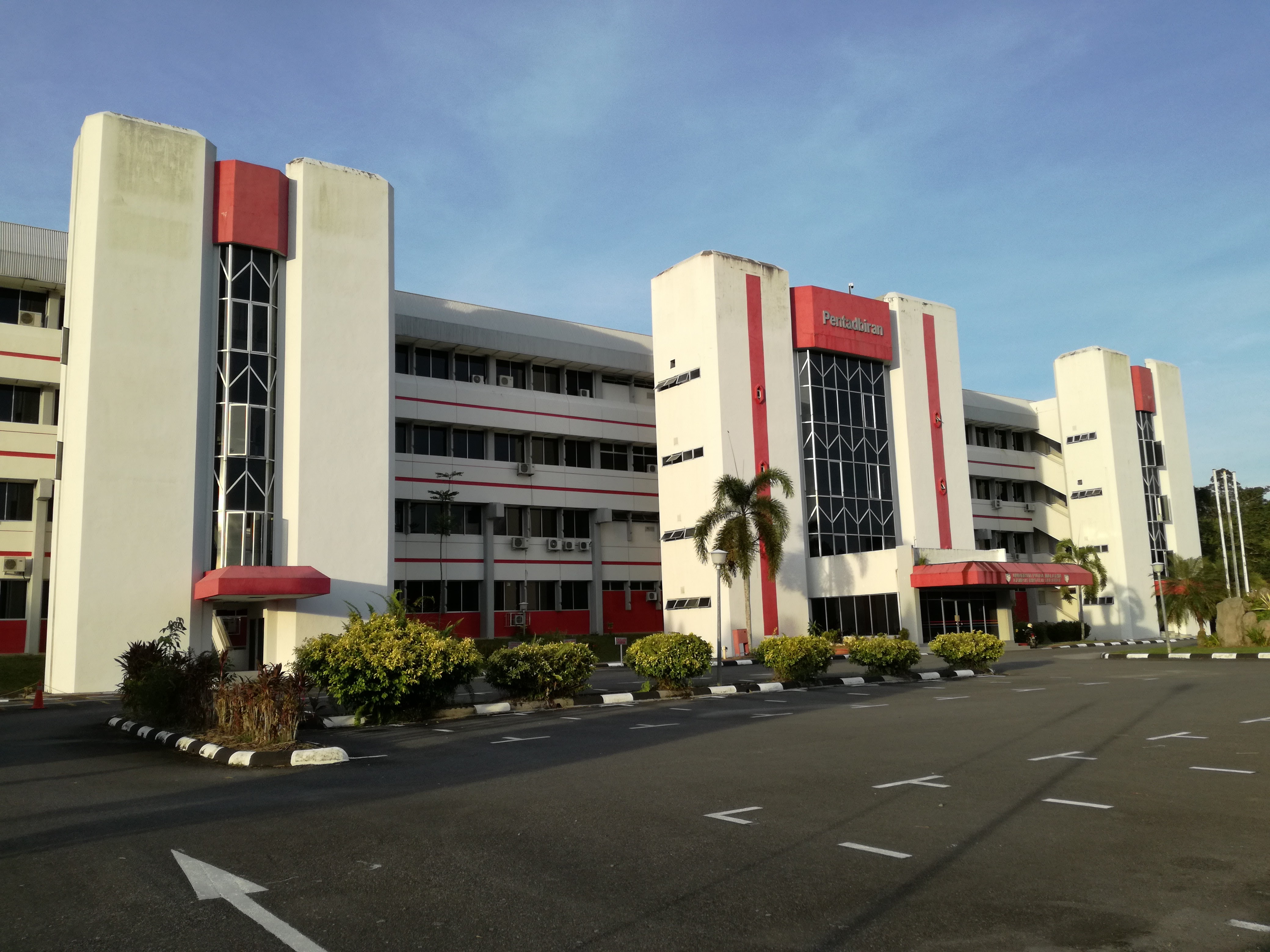
The administration building

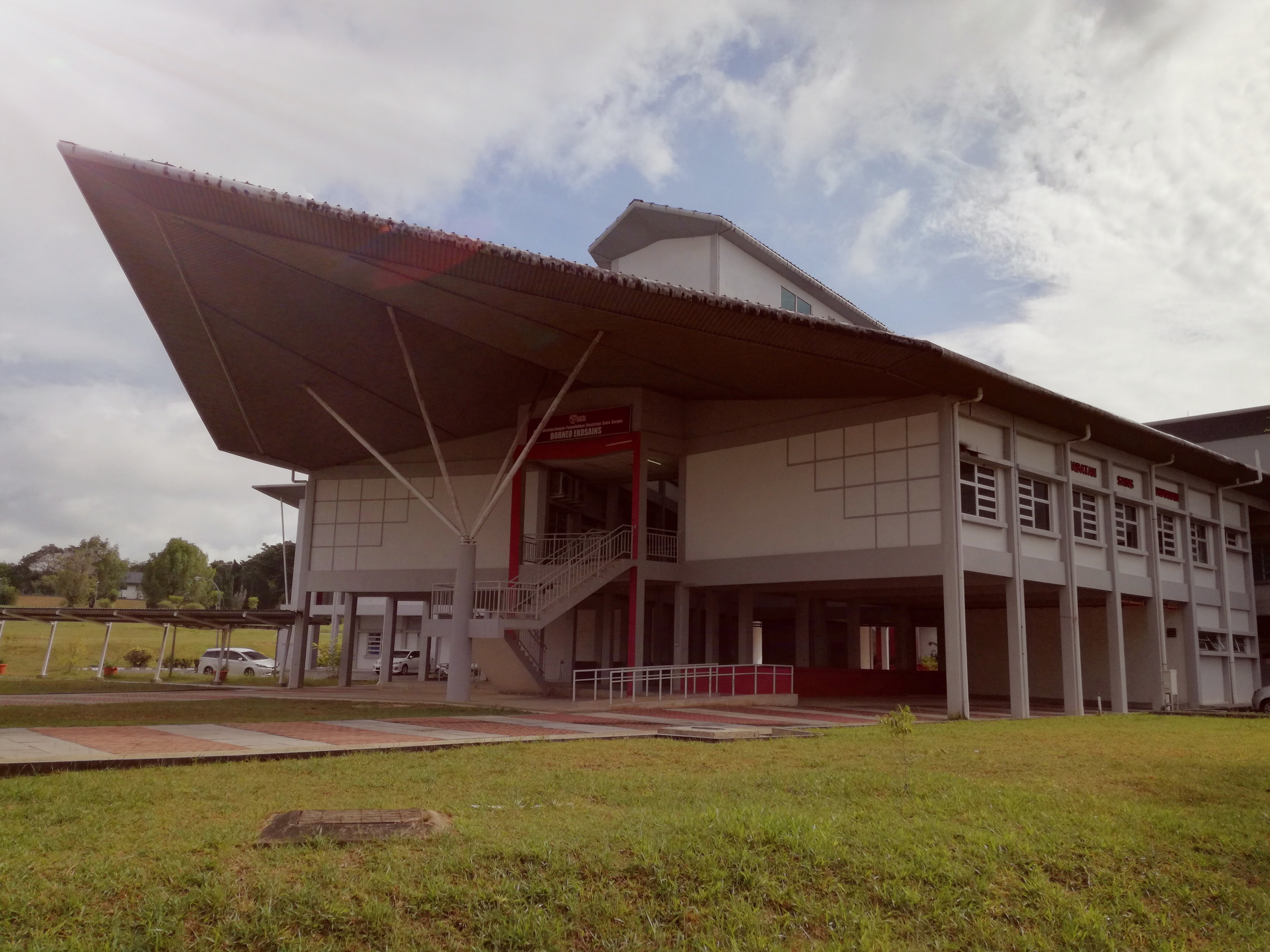
Institute of Ecosystem Science Borneo

University of Putra Malaysia Sarawak (Malay: Universiti Putra Malaysia Sarawak), abbreviated as UPMS, is a twin campus of University of Putra Malaysia (UPM), located about 10 kilometers from Bintulu, Sarawak. Previously known as University of Putra Malaysia Bintulu Campus or UPMKB, it was reopened in November 2001 under UPM's 2001–2010 development strategy. On 30 June 2025, the campus was officially renamed as part of a rebranding initiative.. The change reflects an updated institutional identity and academic direction. UPMS was initially established to support UPM's focus on agricultural and biosource studies and has since expanded its scope.

UPMS covers 714 hectares and had over 1,500 students enrolled in 2019. It is situated in an area with diverse natural resources, which are incorporated into its academic and research activities related to agriculture and natural resource management. UPMS contributes to regional and national plans, including the Sarawak Post COVID-19 Development Strategy 2030, while remaining part of the broader UPM framework.

== History ==
UPMS was initially established as Universiti Putra Malaysia Bintulu Campus (UPMKB), with its history beginning on 10 August 1974 at a temporary campus located at the Natural Resources Training Centre in Semenggok, Kuching. In June 1987, the campus was relocated to its permanent site in Bintulu.

On 27 August 1987, UPMKB was officially named Universiti Pertanian Malaysia Sarawak, becoming a branch campus through the Universiti Pertanian Malaysia Order (No. 2) 1987. At the time, Universiti Pertanian Malaysia — known today as Universiti Putra Malaysia (UPM) — established the campus under three study centres: the school of applied sciences, the school of basic Sciences, and the school of social sciences and management. The centre offered three diploma-level programmes: the diploma in agriculture, the diploma in forestry, and the diploma in agribusiness, in addition to an introductory programme.

=== Closure and reopening ===
During the month of September, 1994, UPMKB was closed down and brought under the wing of the Malaysia Ministry of Education to be converted into a temporary site for a teachers' training college. However, under a directive by the Cabinet, UPMKB was reopened on November 5, 2001. The first batch of students for the November 2001/2002 semester numbered at 242 students who enrolled in the Diploma in Agriculture, Diploma in Forestry and Diploma in Engineering (Emergency and Safety) programs.

=== First batch of graduates after reopening ===
Approximately 600 students from this faculty have successfully completed their diploma-level program during the 2004/2005 session, with an additional 85 students from the 2005/2006 session. The first batch of UPMKB graduates received their diploma during the Convocation held in the months of July and September, 2005.

=== Rebranding ===
On 30 June 2025, UPMKB was officially rebranded as Universiti Putra Malaysia Sarawak (UPMS). The change was announced by the chancellor of Universiti Putra Malaysia, Sultan Sharafuddin Idris Shah, during a formal ceremony at Istana Alam Shah in Klang. The rebranding reflects the campus's expanded role in supporting academic, research and development efforts related to agriculture, food security and renewable energy in East Malaysia. It is also aligned with Sarawak's Post-COVID-19 Development Strategy 2030 and UPM's long-term institutional goals.

As part of the restructuring, the leadership title of the campus head was changed from "Director" to "Provost UPM Sarawak", with the position currently held by Shahrul Razid Sarbini. The campus continues to operate as a branch of Universiti Putra Malaysia, with enhanced emphasis on regional collaboration and sectoral specialisation.

== Faculties ==
The campus has two faculties namely Faculty of Agricultural Science and Forestry (FSPH) and Faculty of Humanities, Management and Science (FKPS). Both faculties are formed on 1 July 2020, as a result of restructuring in UPMKB. The restructuring began in 2018 where five main thrusts have been identified, which are agriculture, forestry, industrial chemistry, renewable energy and ethnic study. The five main thrusts help the campus positioning itself and determining its future education plan.

== Sri Rajang College ==
The Sri Rajang College (Kolej Sri Rajang or KSR) is the only residential college in the campus, providing accommodation facilities to the students. It was established in 2002, named after the longest river in Malaysia, the Rajang River. KSR consists of 10 blocks that could accommodate up to 1,770 students. The location of KSR is adjacent to cafeteria, clinic and self-service laundry.

== Gallery ==
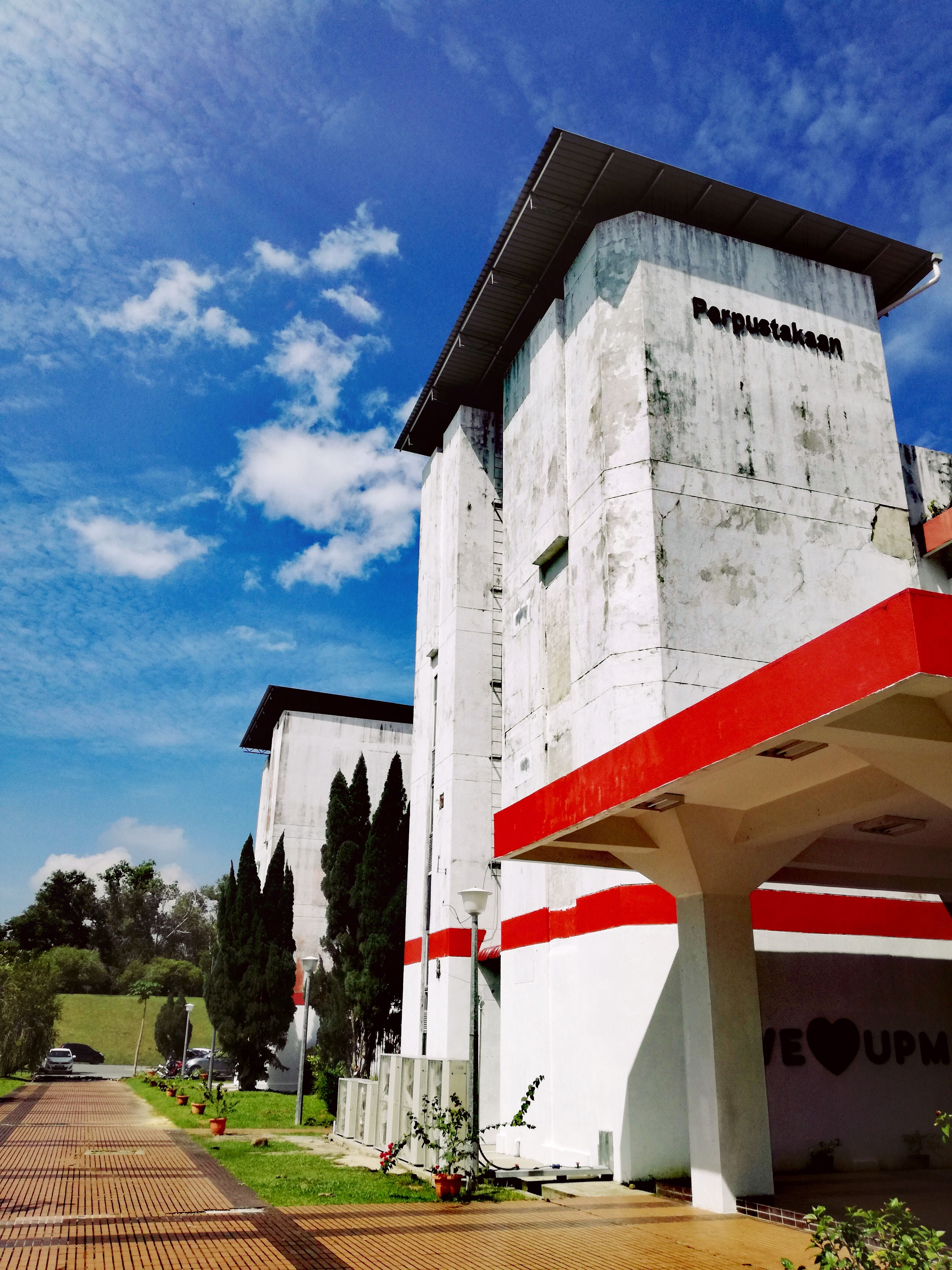
Library

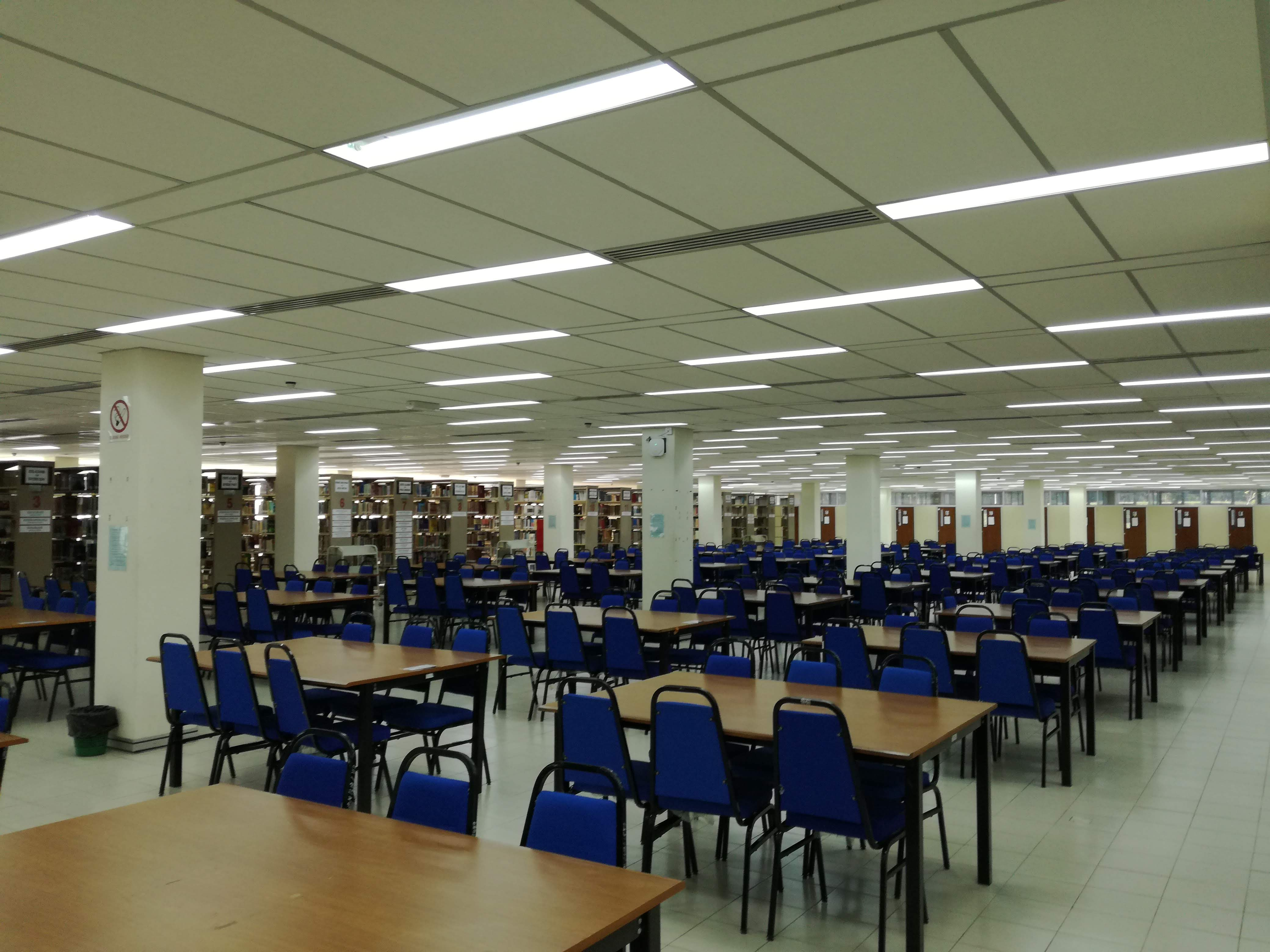
In the library

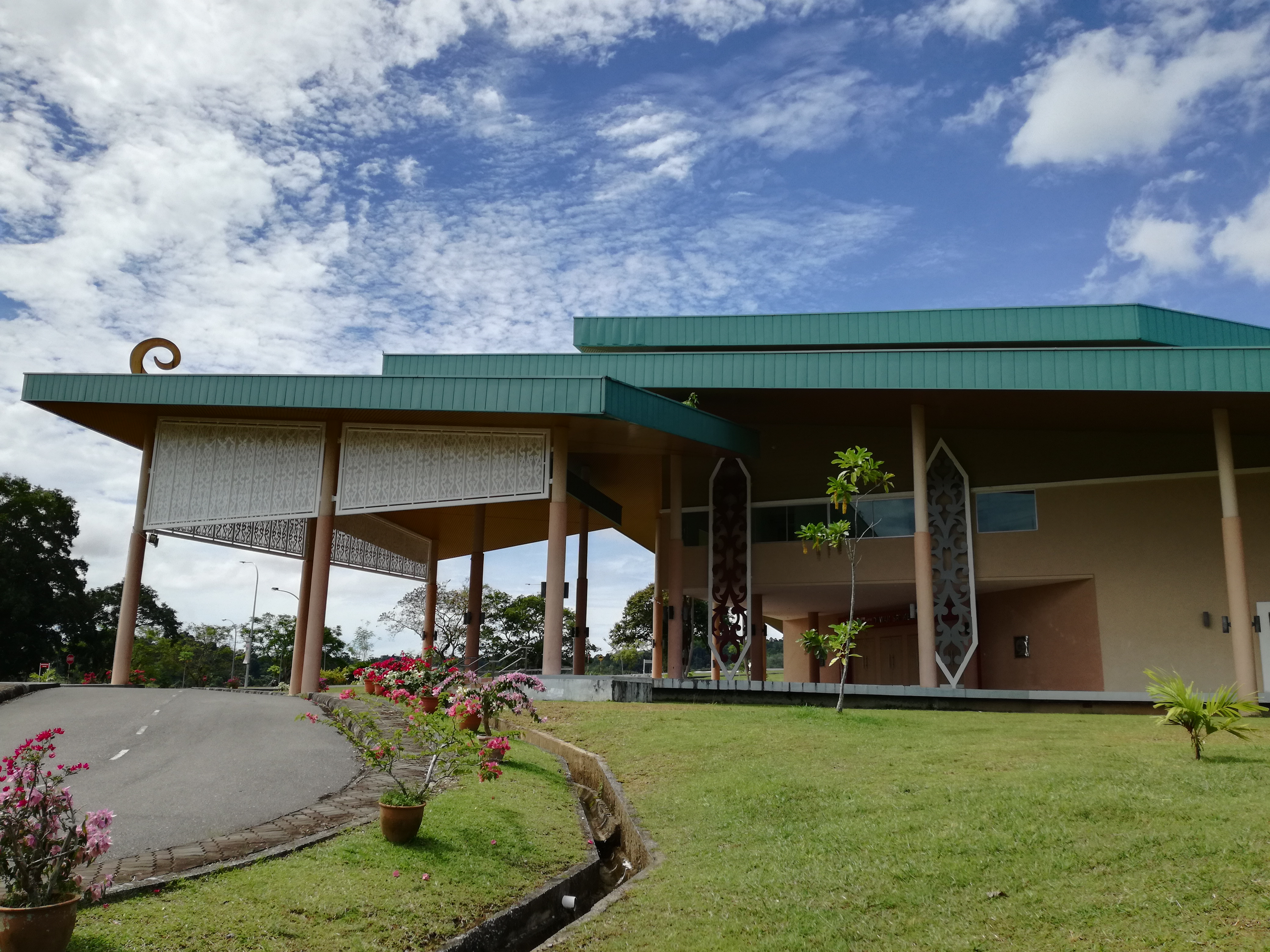
Sri Kenyalang Hall

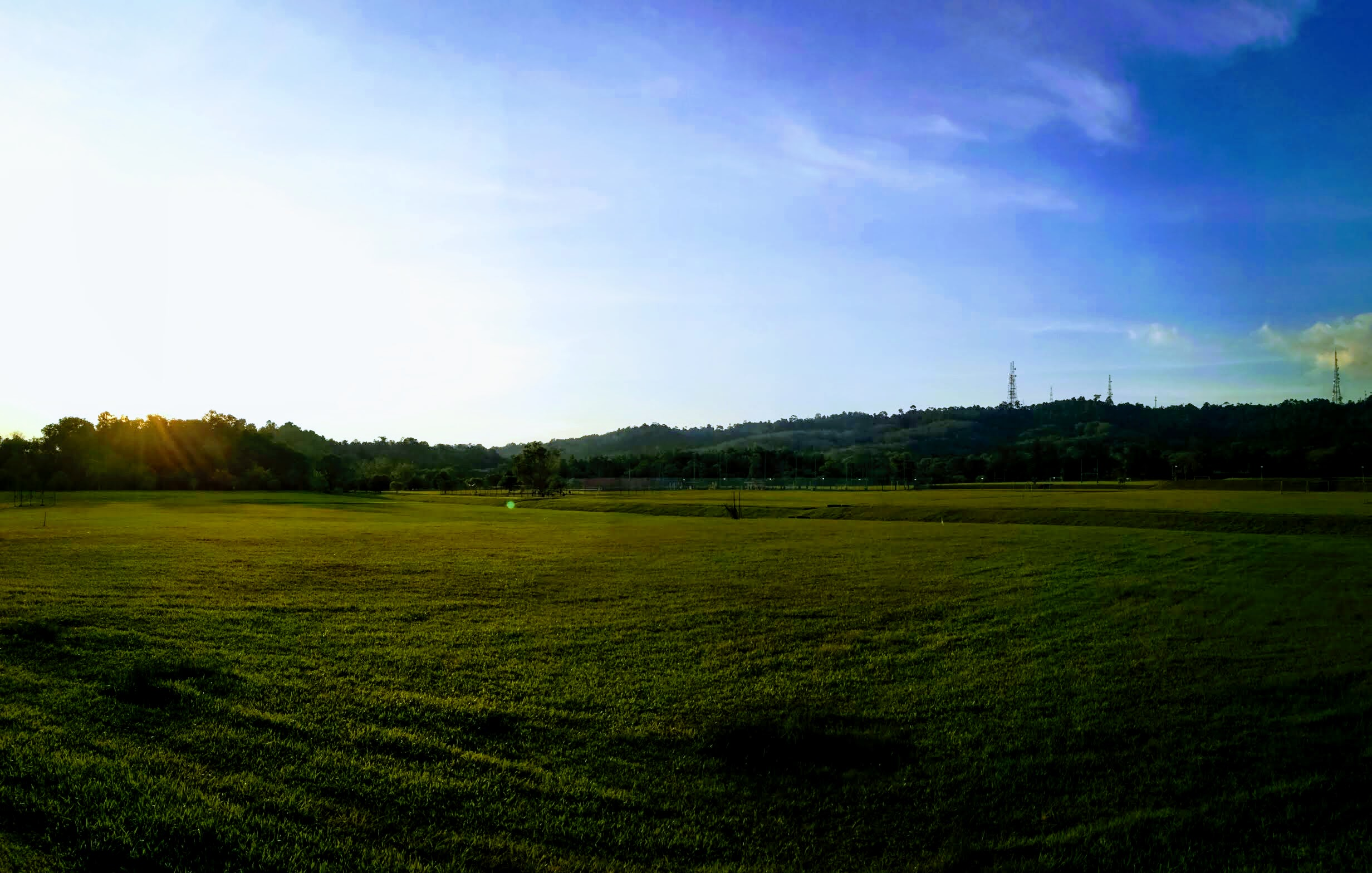
Sports field

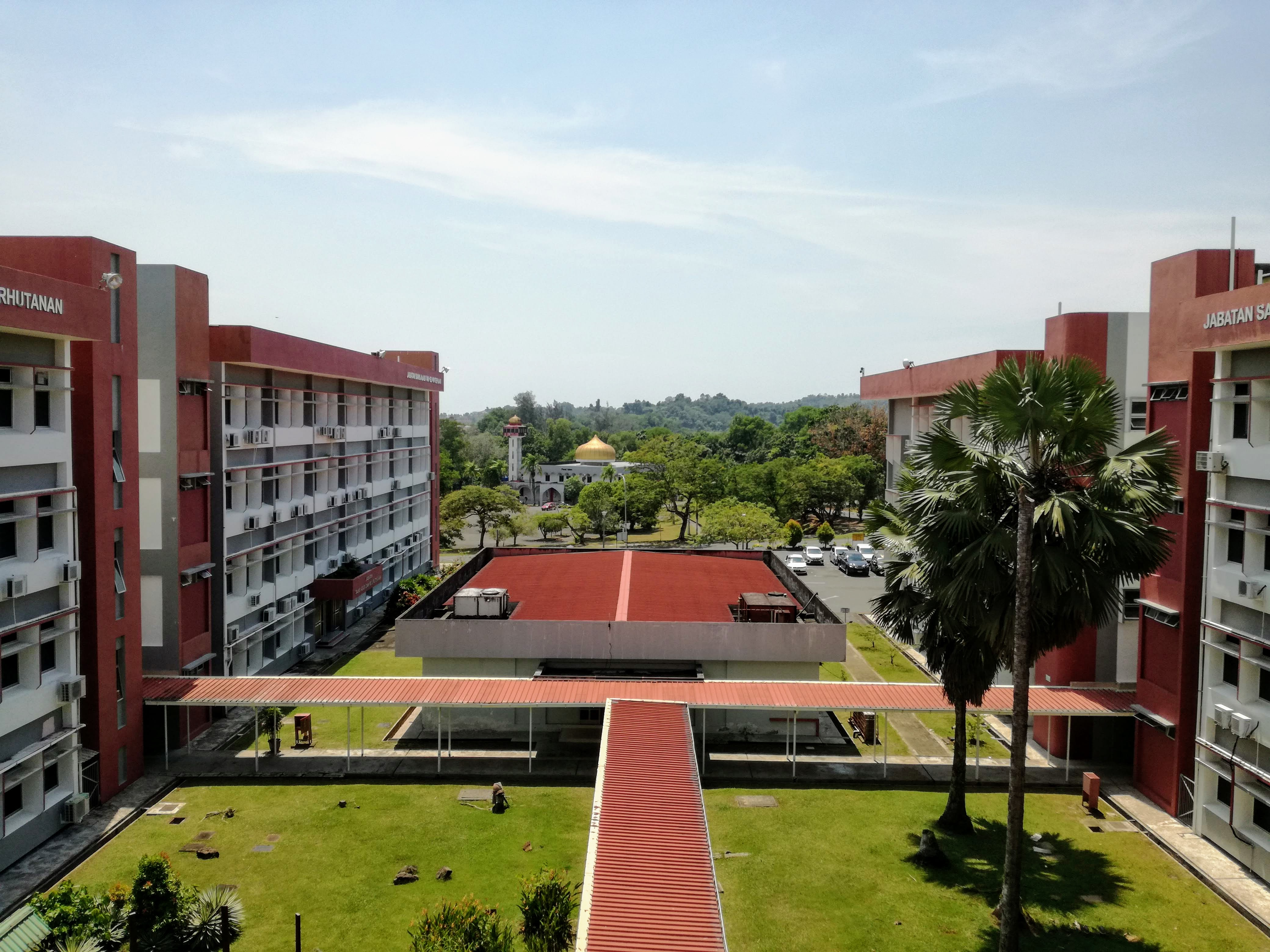
The scenery from the Department of Crop Science

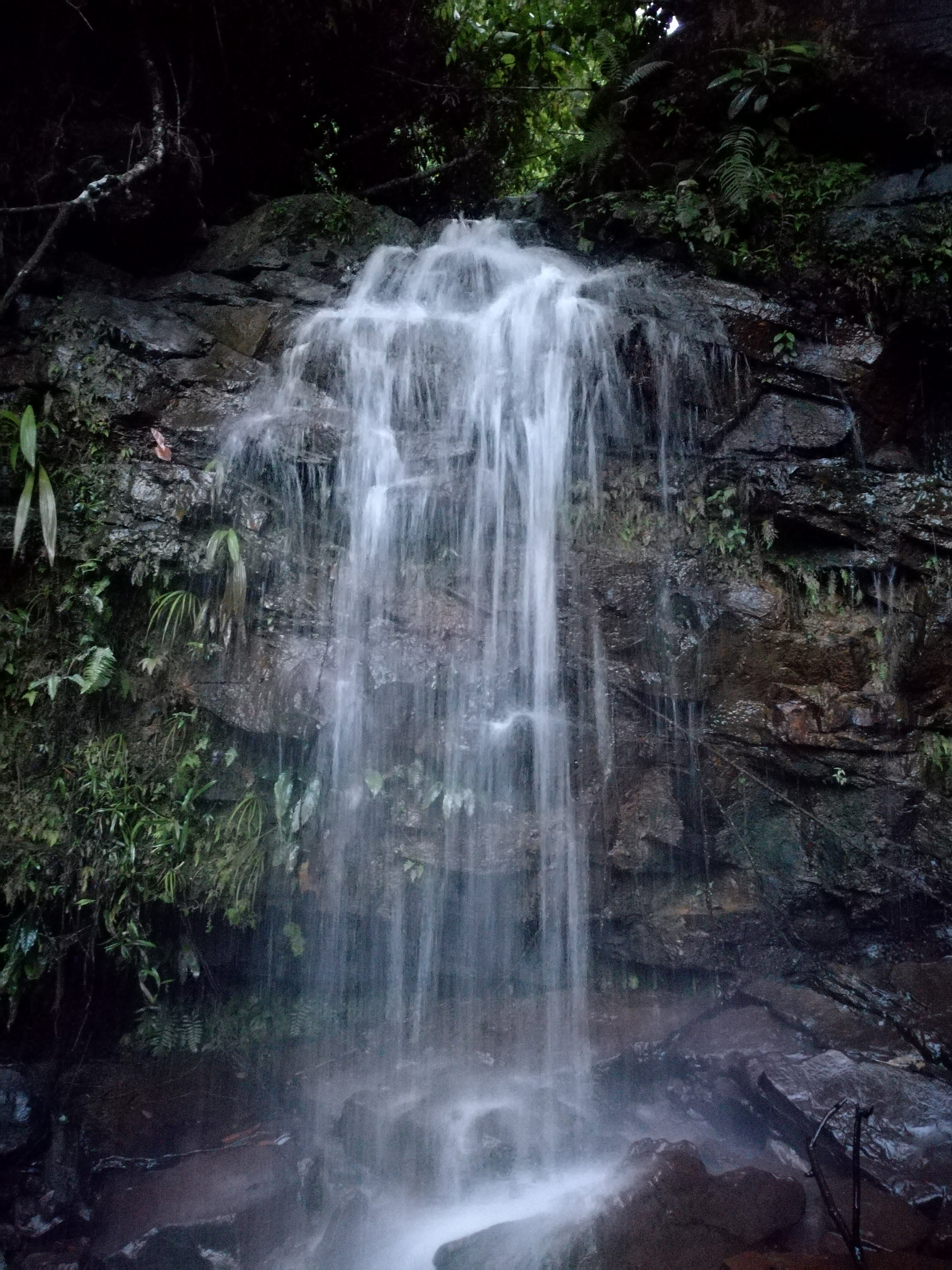
Waterfall Park

== See also ==
- List of universities in Malaysia
