= Bintulu Airport =

Airport in Sarawak, East Malaysia

Bintulu Airport Lapangan Terbang Bintulu
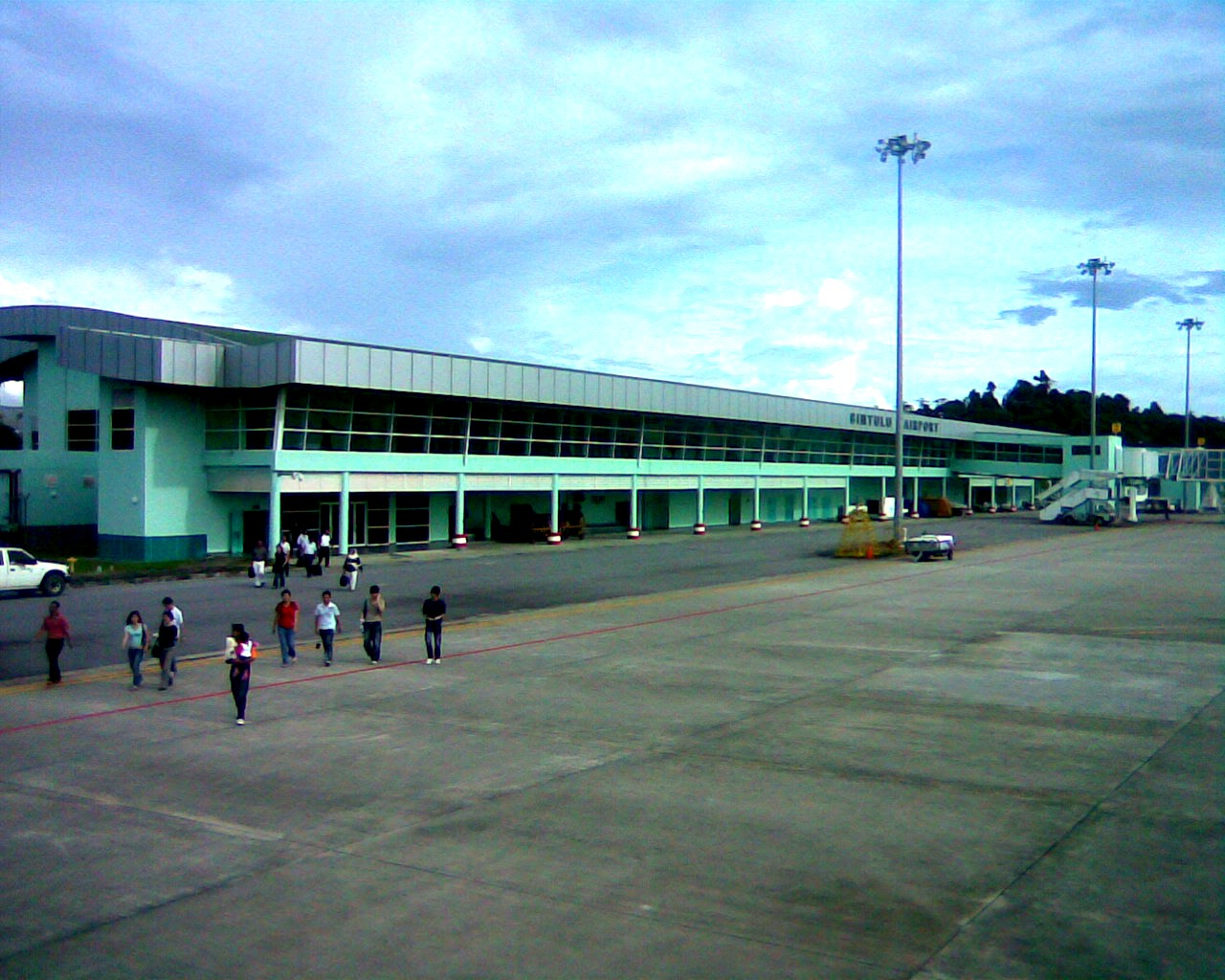
- IATA: BTU; ICAO: WBGB

Summary
- Airport type: Public
- Owner: Government of Malaysia
- Operator: Malaysia Airports Holdings Berhad
- Serves: Bintulu Division, Sarawak, East Malaysia
- Location: Bintulu, Sarawak, East Malaysia
- Opened: 30 March 2003; 23 years ago
- Time zone: MST (UTC+08:00)
- Elevation AMSL: 74 ft (23 m)
- Coordinates: 03°07′27″N 113°01′11″E

Maps
- Sarawak State in Malaysia

- Location in East Malaysia BTU /WBGB (Borneo) BTU /WBGB (Malaysia) BTU /WBGB (Southeast Asia) BTU /WBGB (Asia)

Runways
| Direction | Length | | Surface |
| Direction | m | ft | Surface |
|---|---|---|---|
| 17/35 | 2,745 | 9,006 | Asphalt |

Statistics (2025)
- Passenger: 1,002,257 (▲17.9%)
- Cargo (tonnes): 1,232 (▼10.6%)
- Aircraft movements: 9,628 (▲19.6%)
- Source: official website AIP Malaysia

Bintulu Airport (IATA: BTU, ICAO: WBGB) is an airport serving Bintulu, a town in the state of Sarawak in Malaysia. The airport is located 5 km (3.1 mi), 23 km (14 mi) by road, southwest of the city, and although small, it is able to handle planes as large as a Boeing 747. In 2008, the airport handled 417,918 passengers and 16,787 aircraft movements.

Bintulu Airport was officially inaugurated by Prime Minister Mahathir Mohamad on December 19, 2002.

== History ==
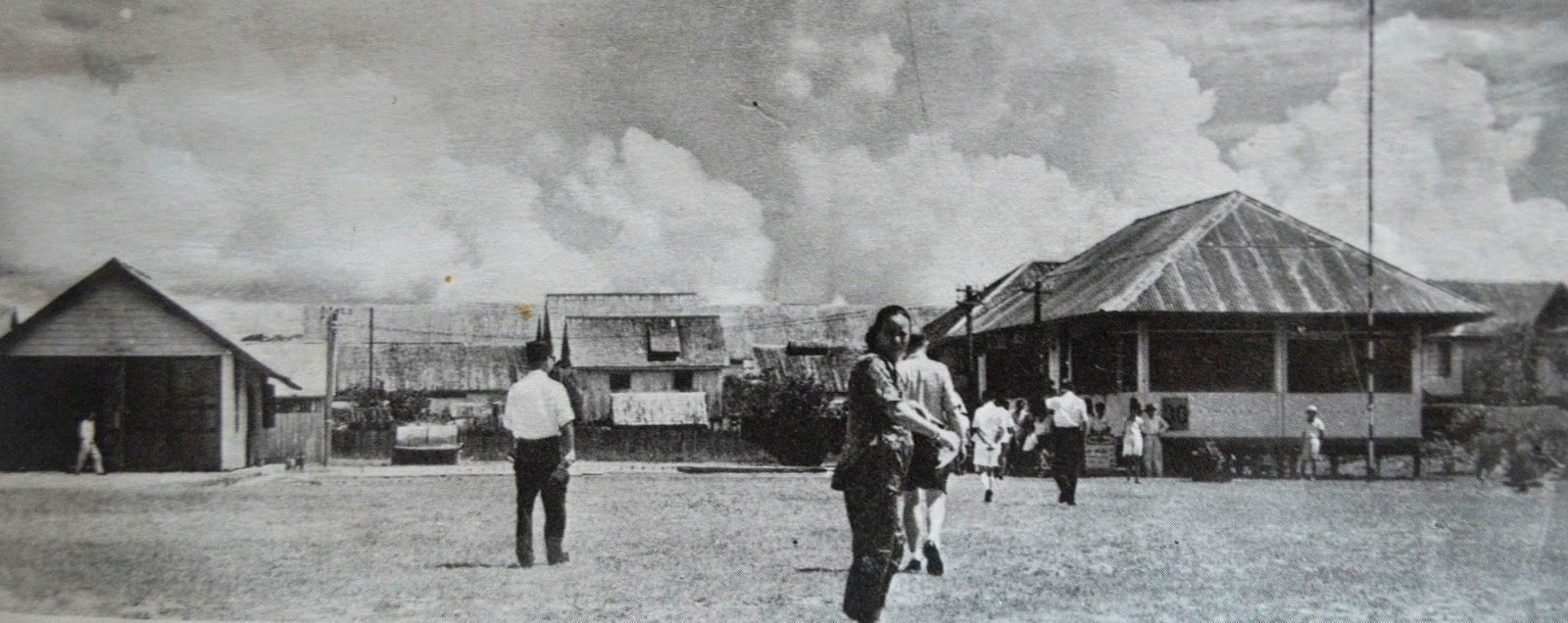
Old Bintulu Airport building (right) in 1955

The history of Bintulu Airport began in early 1937 when the British colony built an airfield situated between a river at one end and the sea coast at the other end.

Bintulu's old airport was open for operation on 1 September 1955, with a grass-surface runway catering for de Havilland DH.89 Dragon Rapide and Scottish Aviation Twin Pioneer aircraft operated by Borneo Airways.

In 1963, larger types of aircraft such as DC-3 services were introduced. In 1966, the runway was resurfaced with bitumen, and the terminal building was extended to cater for an increasing number of passengers.

On 1 July 1968, Malaysia-Singapore Airlines introduced scheduled Fokker 27 services into Bintulu. The terminal building and the parking apron was extended in 1981 to accommodate Fokker 50 aircraft. The old airport served the town until 30 March 2003, when it closed and moved to a location outside of town.

In September 2005, the first low-cost airline in Malaysia, AirAsia, started operating in Bintulu airport. FlyAsianXpress (FAX), a subsidiary company of AirAsia, took over major domestic routes linking Bintulu. It started its operation on 1 August 2006, and lasted until 30 September 2007. On 1 October 2007, Malaysia Airlines subsidiary MASwings took over the link connecting Bintulu.

== Airlines and destinations ==
| Airlines | Destinations |
|---|---|
| AirAsia | Kota Kinabalu, Kuala Lumpur–International, Kuching |
| AirBorneo | Miri, Mukah, Sibu |
| Batik Air Malaysia | Kuala Lumpur–International |
| Malaysia Airlines | Kuala Lumpur–International |

== Traffic and statistics ==
=== Traffic ===
Annual passenger numbers and aircraft statistics
| Year | Passengers handled | Passenger % change | Cargo (tonnes) | Cargo % change | Aircraft movements | Aircraft % change |
|---|---|---|---|---|---|---|
| 2003 | 427,894 | Steady | 940 | Steady | 13,627 | Steady |
| 2004 | 464,576 | ▲8.6 | 1,375 | ▲46.3 | 13,546 | ▼0.6 |
| 2005 | 487,077 | ▲4.8 | 2,110 | ▲53.4 | 13,619 | ▲0.5 |
| 2006 | 449,673 | ▼7.7 | 2,205 | ▲4.5 | 11,804 | ▼13.3 |
| 2007 | 381,158 | ▼15.2 | 2,252 | ▲2.1 | 7,093 | ▼39.9 |
| 2008 | 417,918 | ▲9.6 | 1,978 | ▼12.2 | 16,787 | ▲136.7 |
| 2009 | 487,060 | ▲16.5 | 1,903 | ▼3.8 | 51,009 | ▲203.9 |
| 2010 | 557,459 | ▲14.4 | 1,703 | ▼10.5 | 24,246 | ▼52.5 |
| 2011 | 590,253 | ▲5.9 | 2,071 | ▲21.6 | 17,122 | ▼29.4 |
| 2012 | 661,553 | ▲12.1 | 2,574 | ▲24.3 | 12,294 | ▼28.2 |
| 2013 | 779,774 | ▲17.9 | 2,553 | ▼0.8 | 13,661 | ▲11.1 |
| 2014 | 832,440 | ▲6.8 | 2,318 | ▼9.2 | 12,968 | ▼5.1 |
| 2015 | 800,008 | ▼3.9 | 2,383 | ▲2.8 | 12,638 | ▼2.5 |
| 2016 | 805,206 | ▲0.6 | 2,647 | ▲11.1 | 12,130 | ▼4.0 |
| 2017 | 849,596 | ▲5.5 | 2,211 | ▼16.4 | 12,021 | ▼0.9 |
| 2018 | 923,033 | ▲8.6 | 3,566 | ▲25.1 | 13,062 | ▲8.7 |
| 2019 | 1,114,513 | ▲20.7 | 4,659 | ▲30.7 | 12,901 | ▼1.2 |
| 2020 | 370,437 | ▼66.8 | 1,378 | ▼70.4 | 6,529 | ▼49.4 |
| 2021 | 165,619 | ▼55.3 | 381 | ▼72.3 | 3,520 | ▼46.1 |
| 2022 | 725,872 | ▲338.3 | 1,752 | ▲359.8 | 8,013 | ▲127.6 |
| 2023 | 871,153 | ▲20.0 | 1,591 | ▼9.2 | 8,665 | ▲8.1 |
| 2024 | 850,088 | ▼2.4 | 1,382 | ▼13.1 | 8,050 | ▼7.1 |
| 2025 | 1,002,257 | ▲17.9 | 1,232 | ▼10.6 | 9,628 | ▲19.6 |
^{Source: Ministry of Transport (Malaysia)}

=== Statistics ===
Busiest domestic flights out of Bintulu Airport by frequency as of October 2025
| Rank | Destination | Frequency (weekly) | Airlines |
|---|---|---|---|
| 1 | Kuching, Sarawak | 36 | AirAsia |
| 2 | Kuala Lumpur | 35 | AirAsia, Malaysia Airlines, Batik Air |
| 3 | Miri, Sarawak | 7 | MASwings |
| 3 | Sibu, Sarawak | 7 | MASwings |
| 5 | Kota Kinabalu, Sabah | 6 | AirAsia |
| 6 | Mukah, Sarawak | 2 | MASwings |

== Pan Borneo Highway project ==
Bintulu Airport is one of the 11 work package contracts (WPCs), as its junction will be part of it. It was conducted by Lebuhraya Borneo Utara Sdn Bhd (LBU) as turnkey contractor and was taken by KKBWCT Joint Venture Sdn Bhd to Sungai Arip in Sibu and Pekerjaan Piasau Konkerit Sdn Bhd (PPK) to Sungai Tangap in Miri, as it shows:

1. WPC 09 - Sg. Arip Bridge to Bintulu Airport Junction - KKBWCT Joint Venture Sdn Bhd.
2. WPC 10 - Bintulu Airport Junction - Sg. Tangap - Pekerjaan Piasau Konkerit Sdn Bhd.

== See also ==
- List of airports in Malaysia
