= Malaysia LNG =

Malaysian manufacturing company

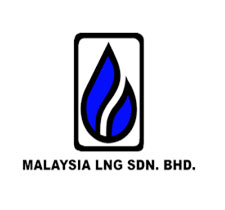
- Type: Private limited company
- Industry: Liquefied natural gas production
- Founded: 1978 (MLNG Satu), 1992 (MLNG Dua), 1995 (MLNG Tiga), 2012 (Petronas LNG 9)
- Headquarters: Bintulu, Sarawak, Malaysia
- Number of locations: 1 (complex with 9 trains) (2023)
- Area served: Global
- Products: Liquefied natural gas (LNG), Liquefied petroleum gas (LPG)
- Owner: Petronas (majority shareholder)
- Parent: Petronas
- Divisions: MLNG Satu, MLNG Dua, MLNG Tiga, Petronas LNG 9

Malaysia LNG (MLNG) is a liquefied natural gas manufacturer in Malaysia. It operates in the 9 liquefaction modules PETRONAS LNG Complex, Bintulu, Sarawak. In 2007, it was the largest LNG manufacturing complex. Currently, top 5 largest LNG plant in the world as of 2022.

== History ==
Malaysia LNG Sdn. Bhd. (MLNG Satu) was incorporated on 14 June 1978 in order to build first Malaysian LNG Plant of three trains with a capacity of 2.7 million ton per annum (Mtpa) each. Its first liquefied natural gas (LNG) was delivered in January 1983 (the first cargo dispatched on 29 January 1983).

On 1 June 1992, Malaysia LNG Dua Sdn Bhd (MLNG Dua) was incorporated to manage and operate the second LNG plant of three trains with 2.6 Mtpa capacity each. Its first LNG was delivered in May 1995.

On 8 November 1995, Malaysia LNG Tiga Sdn Bhd (MLNG Tiga) was incorporated to manage and operate the third LNG plant of two trains with 3.6 Mtpa capacity each. Its first LNG was delivered in March 2003.

In 2012, Petronas LNG 9 Sdn Bhd (PL9SB) was incorporated to own the 9th LNG liquefaction Train at the Petronas LNG Complex (PLC). Its first LNG was delivered in September 2016.

("Satu" meaning one, "dua" meaning two and "tiga" meaning three in Malay).

== Plant description ==
The LNG plant is located in Bintulu, in the Malaysian state of Sarawak. It consists of 9 LNG trains, of which three belong to MLNG Satu (the first joint venture), another three to MLNG Dua, two to MLNG Tiga and one to Train 9 (PL9SB). All four projects are located on one site, all use liquefaction technology developed by Air Products & Chemicals Inc. (APCI) and share common facilities. In 2005, the total installed capacity was 21.85 Mtpa of LNG and there was an upgrading project to increase the capacity by 1.4 Mtpa. Train 9 will add an additional 3.6 MTPA capacity to the complex.

The plant has seven LNG storage tanks capable of holding 445,000 cubic metres (15,715,030 cu ft) of LNG. Satu initially had four storage tanks at 65,000m³ each, while the addition of Dua added another 65,000m³. Lastly, Tiga added an extra LNG storage tank with a capacity of 120,000m³. A seventh LNG tank has been constructed, as part of an expansion project.

The plant also produces liquefied petroleum gas (LPG) from its LPG plant as a source of boiler off gas from the process plant.

The LNG and LPG are transported via MLNG Jetty Terminal. The terminal consists of three LNG jetties and one LPG jetty. The MLNG terminal contributed to achieving the 12345th LNG cargo delivery in 2022 with 100% success rate.

The LNG plant acquires its natural gas via pipeline from offshore of Bintulu, Miri and Sabah from its partners Petronas Carigali and Royal Dutch Shell.

== Markets ==
In 2005, Malaysia LNG exported 21.85 million ton of LNG. LNG is exported through Bintulu port ex-ship (for all term Japanese sales) and FOB (for some Korean volumes) on various sized ships. Malaysia Dua has agreed a sale ex-ship to Sendai City Gas and Saibu Gas using small ships. These vessels of 18,928 cu.m. can cause some operational problems as they are relatively slow in loading and occupy one of the berths at Bintulu that is also used for larger ships.

Japan buys 65 percent of Malaysian LNG, and this represented 22 percent of Japan's LNG requirements in 2005. Other importers are Korea (26 percent) and Taiwan (9 percent). In addition to the export on a long-term basis, MLNG also sells LNG on the spot market to the Asia region and the Atlantic Basin. As a result of the 2022 Russian invasion of Ukraine and sanctions towards Russia by European countries, European countries such as United Kingdom, Croatia and France acquired LNG from MLNG.

== Ownership ==
Malaysia LNG is a subsidiary of the Malaysian national oil and gas company Petronas, which is a majority shareholder in all three LNG Ventures (MLNG Satu, MLNG Dua and MLNG Tiga). Besides Petronas, Royal Dutch Shell, Mitsubishi, JX Nippon Oil and the Sarawak Government hold a minority stake.

The complete breakdown of the ownership structure for all Malaysia LNG projects are:

MLNG Satu - Petronas 90 percent, Mitsubishi 5 percent and Sarawak State Government 5 percent

MLNG Dua - Petronas 60 percent, Mitsubishi 15 percent, Shell 15 percent and Sarawak State Government 10 percent

MLNG Tiga - Petronas 60 percent, Shell 15 percent, Nippon Oil 10 percent, Sarawak State Government 10 percent and Mitsubishi (Diamond Gas) 5 percent

Petronas LNG Train 9 - Petronas 90 percent and Nippon Oil 10 percent
