= Alceste =

Alceste may refer to:

== Literature ==
- Alcestis (play), a 438 BC play by Euripides
- Alceste, a character in The Legend of Good Women by Chaucer
- Alceste, a character in Le Misanthrope by Molière

== Operas ==
- Alceste (Lully), a 1674 opera by Jean-Baptiste Lully
- Alceste (Handel), a 1750 opera by George Frideric Handel
- Alceste (Gluck), a 1767 opera by Christoph Willibald Gluck
- Alceste (Schweitzer), a 1773 opera by Anton Schweitzer
- Alceste (Strungk), a 1680 opera by Nicolaus Adam Strungk
- Alceste, a 1768 opera by Pietro Alessandro Guglielmi
- Alceste, a 1922 opera by Rutland Boughton

== Other uses ==
- Alcestis or Alceste, a princess in Greek mythology
- Alceste (trilobite), a trilobite genus
- French ship Alceste, several ships
- HMS Alceste, several ships

== People with the given name ==
- Alceste De Ambris, Italian socialist
