= Ukit people =

Ukit people Dayak Ukit / Orang Bukit / Bekiau
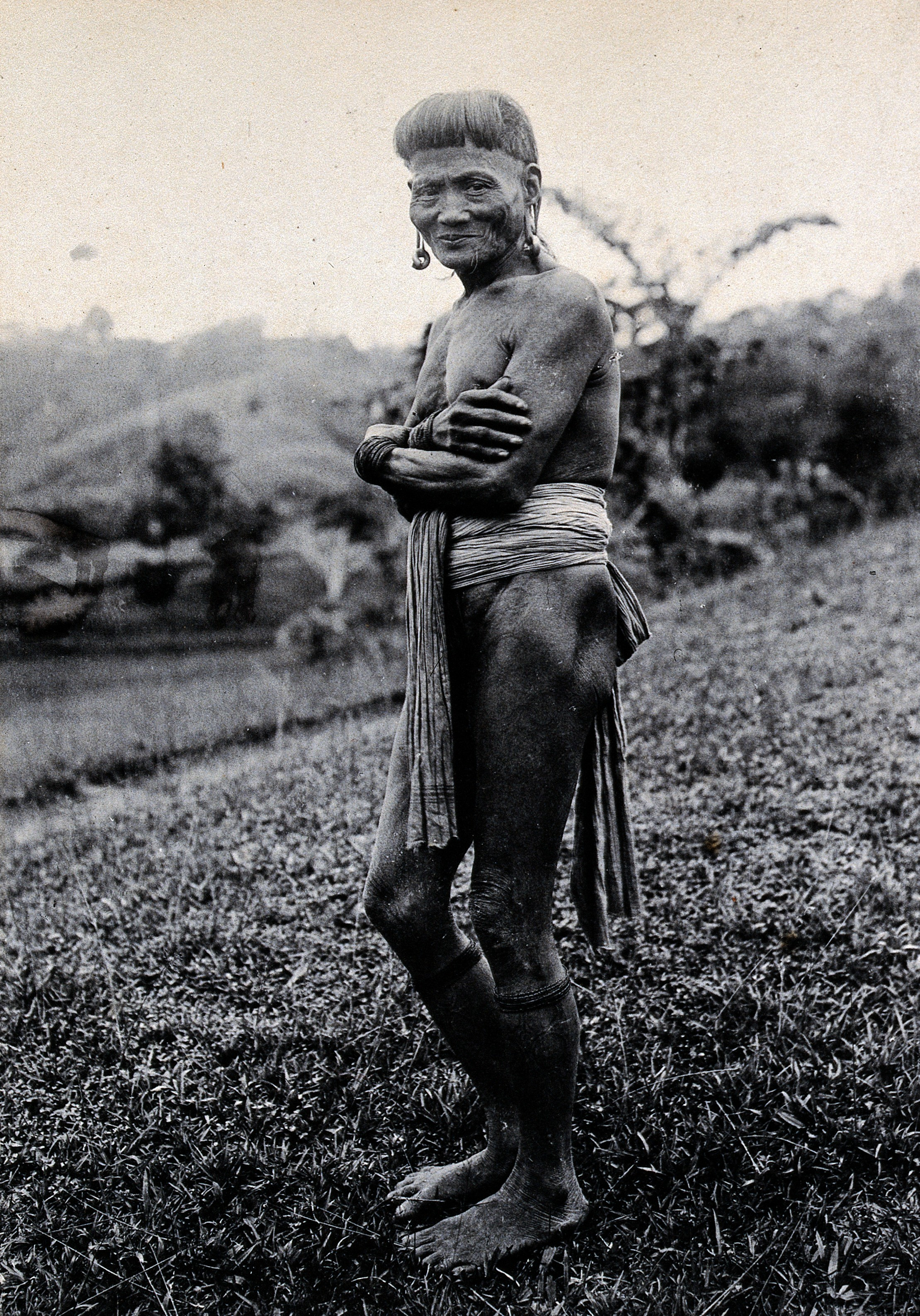
- An Ukit tribesman from Sarawak, Malaysia.

Total population
- 376 (2022)

Regions with significant populations
- Malaysia (Sarawak)

Languages
- Ukit, Malaysian, Sarawak Malay

Religion
- Folk religion (predominantly), Christianity

Related ethnic groups
- Orang Ulu, Bukitan people

The Ukit, also known as Bhuket are a tribe found in Sarawak, Malaysia. They are a small minority people who until recently were nomads in the rain forests of Borneo. Some were settled at Rumah Ukit on the upper reaches of the Batang Balui or Balui River. Most of the Ukits are found in the Upper Rajom and Tatau rivers, Baleh, Sarawak. The Ukit people were also regarded as a sub-group of the purported Klemantan people.

The Ukit's population is small in numbers and suffer potential extinction due to many of the tribesmen being killed a long time ago. Heavy losses in war to stronger Dayak tribes in Borneo (Iban, Kayan and others) resulted them being chased out of their homelands (believed to be the Saribas, Kalaka and Krian areas). Intermarriage with other tribes is also another factor for their decreasing population. Today, the Ukit population is estimated to be only about 120. However, there may still be an unknown number of Ukit living in their traditional way as forest nomads.

In 1880 the Ukits were encountered by the English explorer Harry De Windt who described them as follows:

The Ukits are generally supposed to be the wildest specimens of the human race yet met with in Borneo. This tribe (which is the only one living at the head of Rejang not tattooed) has been occasionally but seldom seen in these regions by Europeans, as they shrink from all intercourse with mankind, and fly at the approach of any but their own race. They are described as being of a much lighter colour than the Poonans, possess no dwellings, and are totally unclothed.

— Harry De Windt

== Bibliography ==
- O'Hanlon Redmond (1985): Into The Heart of Borneo. pp. 143–4, 171–183. Penguin (Salamander Press 1985)
