= Iban people =

Ethnic group from Borneo

Iban Iban / Sea Dayak / Telanying
- Tambai Panggau Libau, traditional colours flown during processions like the Gawai Sandau Ari

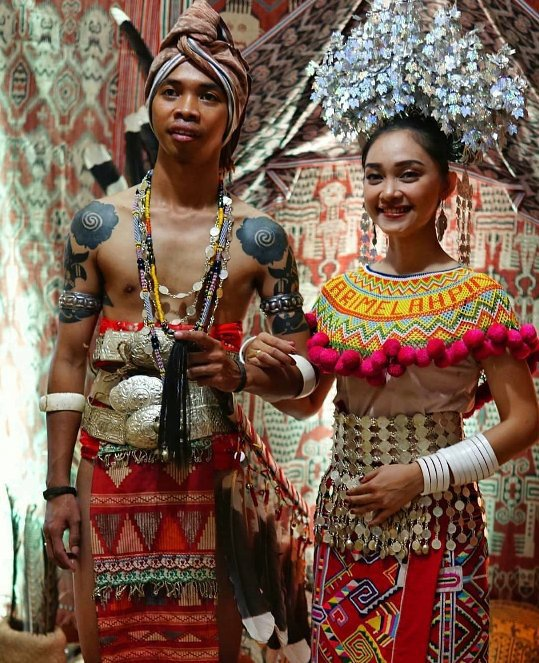
- Iban traditional wedding attire in Kapuas Hulu, West Kalimantan, Indonesia, 2019.

Total population
- approximately 700,000+

Regions with significant populations
- Borneo
- Malaysia (Sarawak): 702,579
- Indonesia (West Kalimantan): 19,978
- Brunei: 17,000

Languages
- Native: Iban; Also: Sarawak Malay; Malaysian Standard Malay; English (Malaysian Iban) Pontianak Malay; Sambas Malay; Kapuas Hulu Malay; Indonesian (Indonesian Iban) Brunei Malay (Bruneian Iban)

Religion
- Majority: Christianity (mainly Anglicanism & Catholicism); Minority: Islam; Animism; Irreligion

The Iban are a Dayak sub-ethnic group native to northwestern Borneo, primarily found in the Malaysian state of Sarawak, Brunei and parts of West Kalimantan, Indonesia. They are one of the largest groups among the broader Dayak peoples, a term historically used to describe the indigenous communities of Borneo. The Iban are best known for their rich cultural traditions, which include distinctive practices in agriculture, music, weaving and social organisation.

Historically, the Iban were known for their warrior culture, particularly the practice of headhunting, which was a central element of their societal structure and spiritual beliefs until the early 20th century. The Iban's traditional social units are based around longhouses, which serve as communal living spaces for extended families. In terms of agriculture, the Iban have long practiced shifting cultivation, particularly of rice, as well as hunting and gathering.

The Iban trace their origins to the Kapuas basin in Kalimantan Barat, specifically the Ketungau tributary which is considered their ancestral land prior to their migration into the territory of modern-day Sarawak from the middle of the 16th century. Their migration was influenced by factors such as tribal conflict, territorial expansion and the search for fertile land. Central to their cultural and spiritual identity is Tembawai Tampun Juah, located in the Segumon region of Sanggau, West Kalimantan, which is considered the symbolic birthplace of the Iban people.

Under the colonial administration of the Brooke family in the 19th century, the Iban played an important role in military campaigns, where they were recruited as soldiers and contributed to the defense of Sarawak and later, Malaysia. Over time, their migratory culture extended beyond Borneo, leading to the establishment of visible diaspora communities in Peninsular Malaysia.

In the contemporary context, the Iban remain a prominent ethnic group in Sarawak, constituting 28.8% of the total population. Despite the influences of modernisation, they have preserved a strong cultural identity. The Iban continue to uphold traditional practices, including their language, Pua Kumbu weaving and ceremonial music, while also participating actively in the region's contemporary social and economic spheres.

== Etymology ==
Before the establishment of the Raj of Sarawak in 1841, the term "Iban" was an exonym used by neighboring ethnic groups to describe the people who would later identify as Iban. At that time, the Iban did not commonly use the term "Iban" for themselves. Instead, they identified by the rivers they inhabited, such as Kami Saribas (We of the Saribas River), Kami Skrang (We of the Skrang River) or Kami Sebuyau (We of the Sebuyau River). In addition to river-based identifiers, the Iban also used names based on geographical areas, for instance, identifying themselves as the people of a particular locality. These identifiers were used to signify their regional and social affiliations, often reflecting their local settlements or areas of influence.

The term "Iban" is commonly believed to have originated as a corruption of the Kayan word hivan, meaning "wanderer." The Kayan people, who lived in the upper reaches of the Rejang River, used the term disparagingly to refer to the Iban pioneers, whose restless nature and migration patterns made them unwelcome neighbors. This term remained largely confined to the Rejang area and was not known to other Dayak groups until the mid-1800s.

Prior to the 19th century, non-Malay indigenous groups in Borneo were often grouped together under the term "Dyaks" or "Dayaks" by outsiders, including Westerners and the Brooke administration. The term was used to describe various indigenous groups, though it was not specific to any one ethnic group. James Brooke, the first Rajah of Sarawak, coined the term "Sea Dayak" to distinguish the Iban from the "Land Dayaks" (such as the Bidayuh). This distinction reflected the Iban's more mobile, riverine lifestyle in contrast to the more settled, agricultural lifestyle of other Dayak groups.

The name "Iban" became more widely accepted by the group over time, particularly after World War II. Despite its origins as an outsider's term, the word "Iban" has been embraced by the people themselves and is now the commonly used term to refer to the group, especially in Sarawak.

== History ==
=== Pre-19th century: early origin and cultural development ===
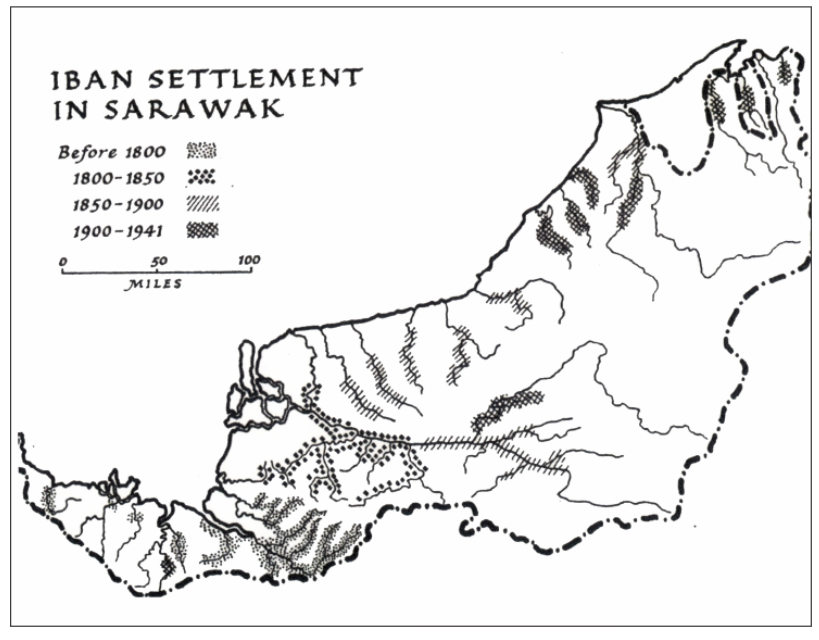
Iban northern expansion between 1800 and 1941

The Iban people have a rich indigenous historical tradition, passed down primarily through oral literature, written records on Papan Turai (wooden plaques) and cultural practices. These sources preserve important details about the Iban's historical migration and settlement.

A central aspect of Iban identity is their deep connection to their ancestral homeland, reflected in both their spiritual beliefs and historical narratives. One key site in this regard is Tembawai Tampun Juah, located in the Segumon region of Sanggau, West Kalimantan, Indonesia. According to Iban oral traditions, Tembawai Tampun Juah is considered the first settlement of the Iban people, symbolising their journey after being separated from their ancestral figures. This site remains culturally and historically significant, embodying the Iban's connection to their land and heritage.

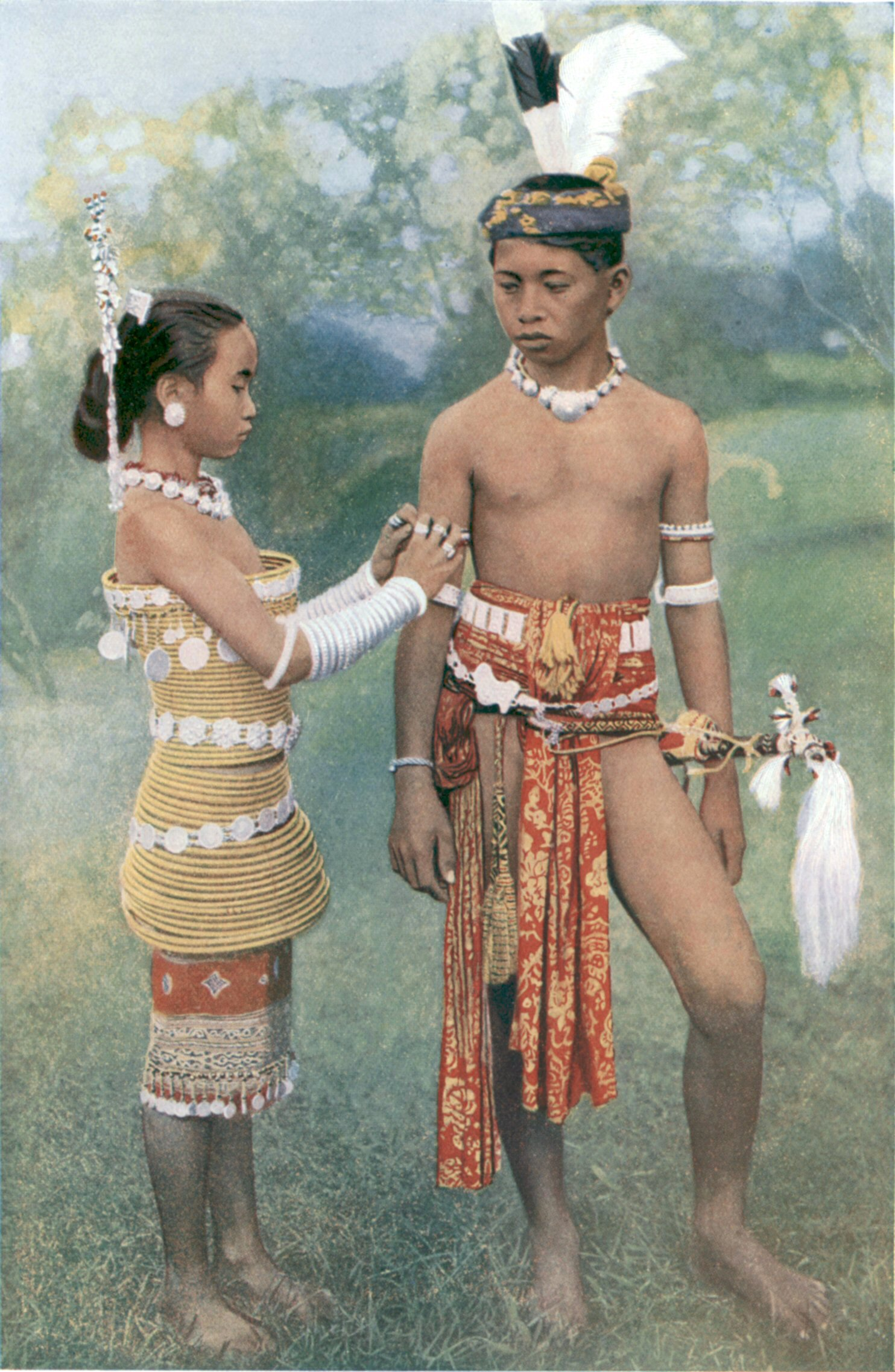
Young Ibans, 1912

In addition to the spiritual significance of Tembawai Tampun Juah, the Iban trace their geographical origins to the Kapuas region in West Kalimantan, specifically the Ketungau tributary, which is traditionally regarded as the birthplace of early Iban leaders and communities. From the middle of the sixteenth century, the Iban began migrating to Sarawak due to tribal conflicts and the search for fertile land. Key locations along their migration included Melanjan in the Kapuas Valley, Pangkalan Tubau near the Kalimantan-Sarawak border, and Lubok Antu, their first major settlement in Sarawak. While Tembawai Tampun Juah represents their mythic origins, the Kapuas River region is considered the historical starting point of their migration. Key locations along their migration route include Melanjan in the Kapuas Valley, Pangkalan Tubau near the Kalimantan-Sarawak border and Lubok Antu, their first major settlement in Sarawak. The migration narrative highlights influential figures such as Lau Moa, a migration leader and ancestral chiefs like Ambau, Mawar Biak and Mawar Tuai, who are said to have guided the Iban to their new territories. This migration story is preserved in the Papan Turai and Iban oral traditions, which continue to hold a central place in Iban cultural identity.

A pivotal figure in the Iban migration narrative is Sengalang Burung, who holds an important place in Iban oral traditions. According to these traditions, Sengalang Burung and his followers initially settled along the Kapuas River in southwestern Borneo. His grandson, Sera Gunting, later led the Iban further westward into the Tiang Laju Range, now part of Sarawak. It is said that at Merakai, a tributary of the Kapuas River, Sengalang Burung convened a council with his followers to plan their migration to Batang Ai, a region that would become a major center of Iban settlement.

The historical timeline of the Iban migration has been further supported by the work of Benedict Sandin (1968), who suggested that the Iban began their migration from the Kapuas Hulu region in the 1550s. The first group of settlers moved into the Batang Lupar area, establishing a community near the Undop River. Over the course of five generations, the Iban expanded their settlements further west, east and north, founding new communities along the Batang Lupar, Batang Sadong, Saribas, and Batang Layar rivers.

Modern linguistic studies, such as those conducted by Asmah Haji Omar (1981), Rahim Aman (1997), Chong Shin and James T. Collins (2019), as well as material culture research by M. Heppell (2020), also support the claim that the Iban language and culture have their roots in the upper Kapuas region. These studies trace the development of the Iban people to this area, reinforcing the historical narratives preserved in oral and written forms.

=== 19th century: migration, colonialism and socio-political changes ===
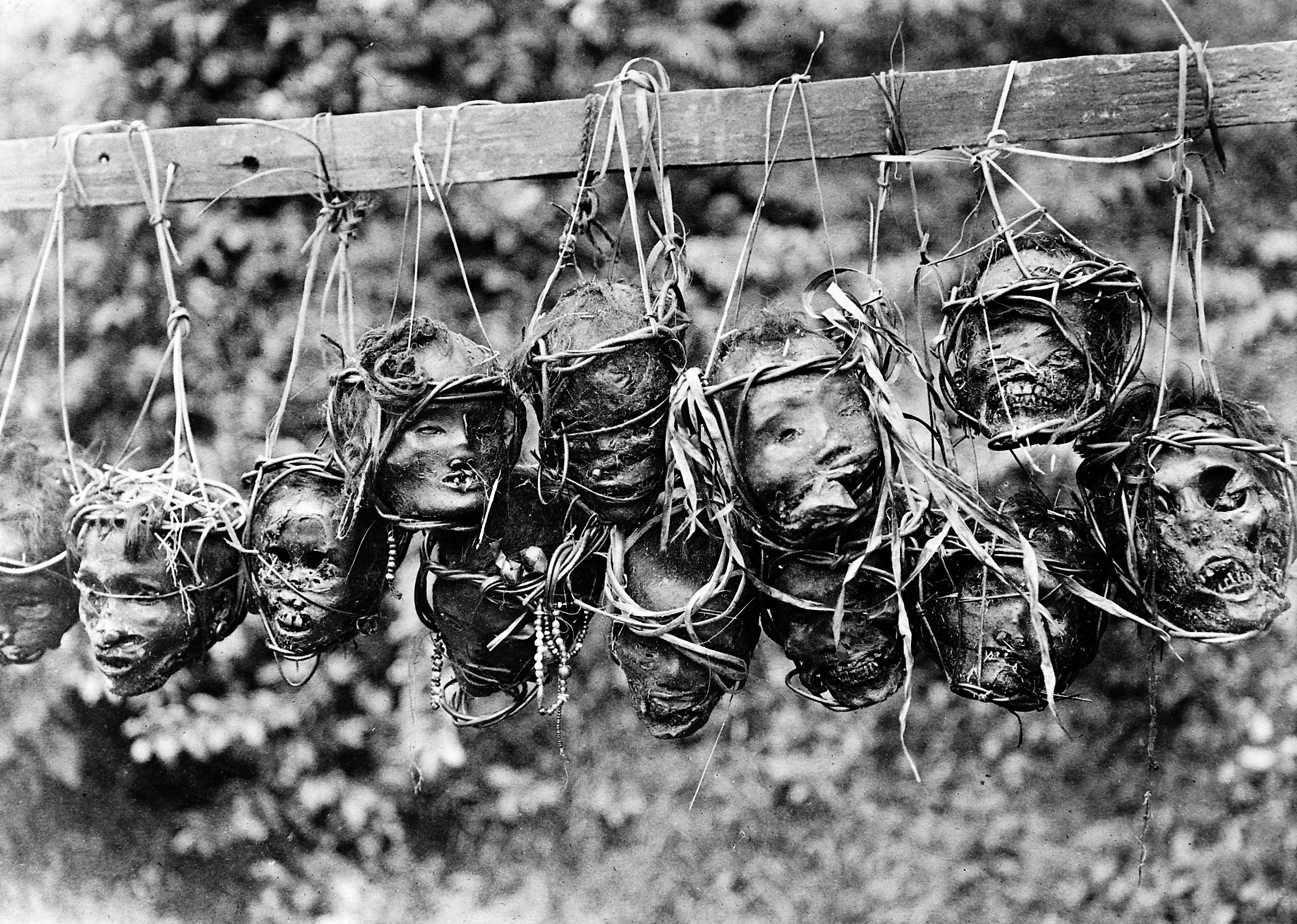
A historical photograph of Punan heads taken by the Sea Dayaks (Iban). Headhunting was a notable practice in Iban culture during the 19th century, closely linked to warfare, spiritual beliefs and the assertion of social status.

The 19th century marked a crucial period in Iban history, particularly with the arrival of the Brooke family and the establishment of the Raj of Sarawak. This era significantly impacted Iban society, influencing their social, economic and political structures. The period also witnessed large-scale migration that helped consolidate the Iban as one of the dominant ethnic groups in Sarawak today. The expansion of the Iban was not merely a physical relocation, but also a cultural and demographic shift, with their customs, language and traditions spreading throughout the western Borneo region.

During this period, the Iban encountered various hunting and gathering societies, as well as some agricultural communities. The presence of the Iban often resulted in the assimilation or displacement of these groups. While some of the original inhabitants were incorporated into Iban society, others were either destroyed or forced to leave their traditional territories.

By the early 1800s, the Iban began migrating into the Rejang River basin, which is now divided into Sarawak's Third, Sixth, and Seventh Divisions. These early migrants primarily came from the northern tributaries of the Batang Lupar and Saribas rivers, moving southward into the Rejang's southern tributaries. Others, from the upper Batang Lupar (such as Batang Ai), traveled through the Leboyan and Kanyau (Embaloh) rivers, eventually reaching the Katibas River, a tributary of the Rejang in central Sarawak.

The Brooke administration played a key role in facilitating Iban migration during Sarawak's territorial expansion, which helped establish the Iban as a dominant ethnic group in the region. James Brooke, a British adventurer, arrived in Borneo in 1838 at the request of the Sultan of Brunei to suppress a rebellion. After his success, he was appointed Rajah of Sarawak in 1841, where he focused on controlling piracy and regulating indigenous practices like headhunting, which were common among the Dayak groups, including the Iban.

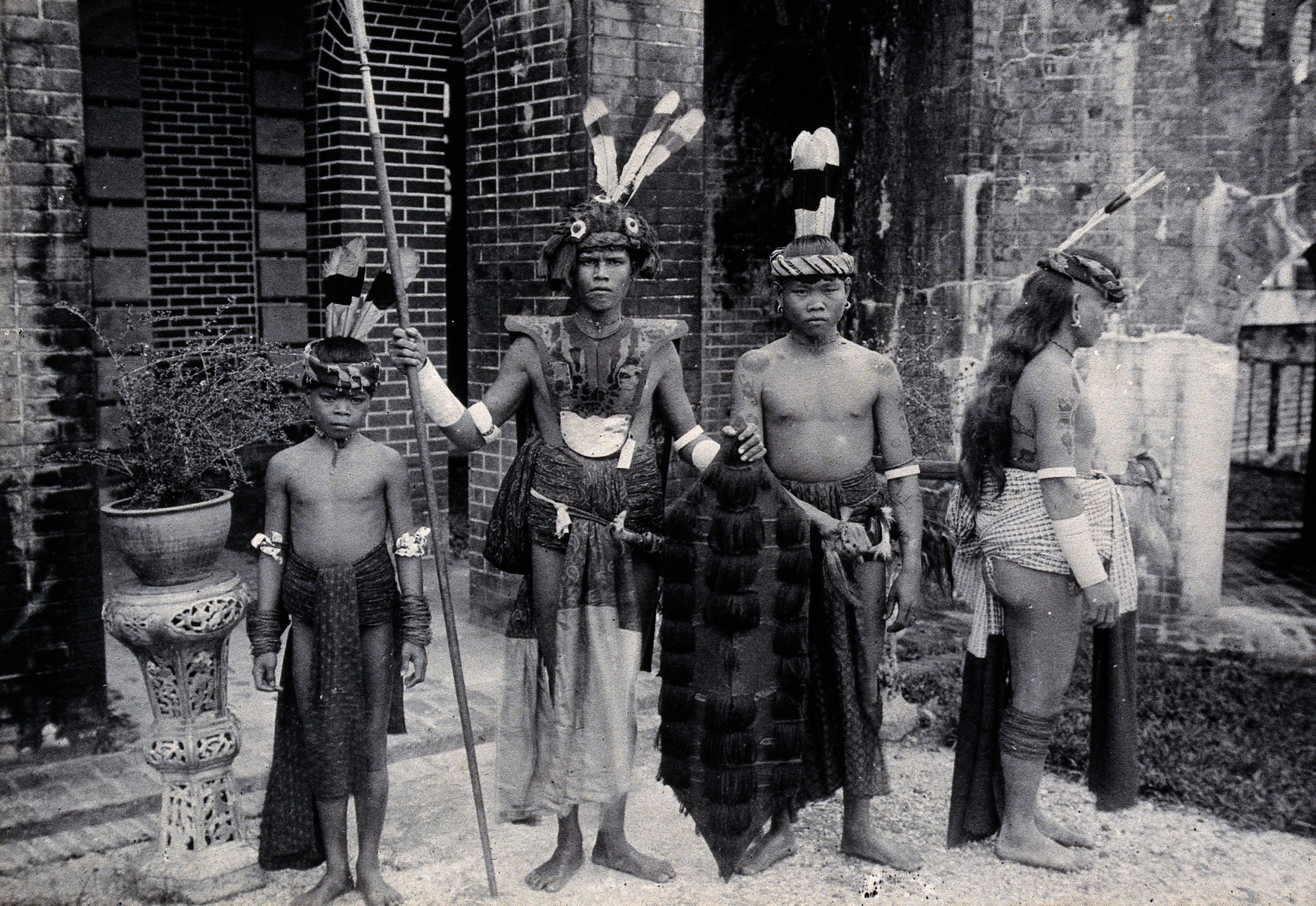
Sarawak; Sea Dayaks with weapons and head-dresses

Brooke's most significant opposition came from Rentap, a prominent Dayak leader. Brooke led three military expeditions against Rentap, culminating in Rentap's defeat at the Battle of Sadok Hill. Throughout these campaigns, Brooke relied heavily on local Dayak soldiers, famously stating, "Only Dayaks can kill Dayaks," underscoring both his dependence on local fighters and the complex dynamics of colonial military alliances. In 1851, Brooke faced accusations of excessive force against the Dayak people, allegedly under the pretext of anti-piracy operations. This led to a Commission of Inquiry in 1854, which cleared him of any wrongdoing. Despite the controversy, Brooke continued to employ Dayak soldiers in various military campaigns, against the Chinese-led uprising of Liu Shan Bang and local Malay resistance movements led by Syarif Masahor.

The Brooke administration also assisted the migration of the Ibans northwards during Sarawak's territorial expansion, thus resulting in the Ibans becoming one of the dominant ethnic groups in Sarawak today

By 1870, large populations of Iban were reported to have established settlements along the Oya and Mukah Rivers. In the early 20th century, Iban migration extended further to regions such as Tatau, Bintulu (formerly Kemena), Balingian and the northern parts of Sarawak, including the Limbang River and Baram Valley.

As Iban populations grew, local resources came under strain, particularly in areas practicing traditional swidden agriculture. To manage this, the Brooke administration imposed migration restrictions to prevent overpopulation and resource depletion, leading to tensions in regions like the Balleh Valley. However, the government also encouraged Iban settlement in newly annexed territories, recognizing their expertise in resource management, including the exploitation of rattan, camphor, damar and wild rubber. Government-supported migration was encouraged in regions such as Limbang (annexed in 1890) and Baram.

By the late 1800s, as areas like Batang Lupar, Skrang Valley, and Batang Ai became overcrowded, the Brooke government facilitated Iban migration to less populated areas. Iban from regions like Simanggang, Batang Lupar, and the Second Division were encouraged to settle in places like Bintulu, Baram, Lundu, and Limbang.

This migration played a crucial role in spreading Iban language, culture, and agricultural practices throughout Sarawak. However, it also led to social and political changes, such as the assimilation of the Bukitan people in Batang Lupar and the Lugat people through intermarriage. In other areas, including those inhabited by the Ukits, Seru, Miriek and Biliun, Iban migration led to violent conflicts and the near-total annihilation of these indigenous populations.

=== 20th Century: Participation in World War II and the Malayan Emergency ===
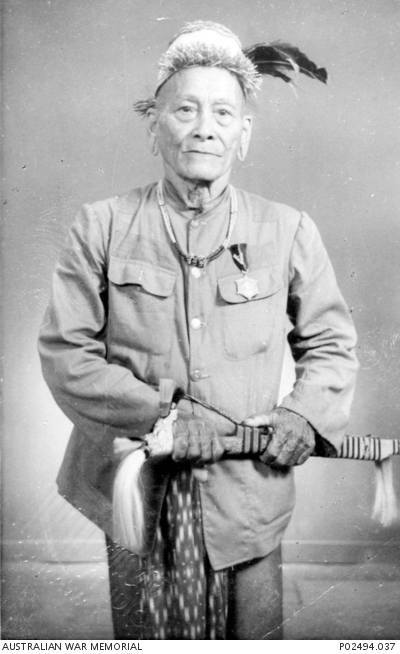
Temenggong Koh anak Jubang, awarded the Queen's Medal for Chiefs and the Order of the British Empire by the British authorities is a well known Iban-Dayak warrior with the British Commissioner-General of Southeast Asia Malcolm MacDonald conclude that Temenggong Koh is a great head-hunter in his younger days before joining the security forces.

In the 20th century, significant Iban migrations continued, with key movements including the settlement of the Baleh tributary of the Rejang River in 1922, the establishment of Iban communities in the Suai, Niah and Sibuti regions in 1927, and a government-supported relocation to Lundu in 1955. Additional migrations occurred in line with government development schemes in the Second and Fourth Divisions of Sarawak. The first Iban migrants arrived in Merotai, Tawau, Sabah around 1920, and the Iban population there grew significantly from the 1960s onward.

The outbreak of Second World War had a significant impact on the Iban and other indigenous groups in Borneo. Following the Japanese invasion, indigenous populations, including the Iban and Malay, faced severe mistreatment and massacres, particularly in the Kapit Division. In response, a force of Dayak fighters, including Iban, was formed to assist the Allied. Trained by a small team of US airmen and Australian special operatives, the Dayak force successfully killed or captured approximately 1,500 Japanese soldiers. They also provided critical intelligence about Japanese-held oil fields.

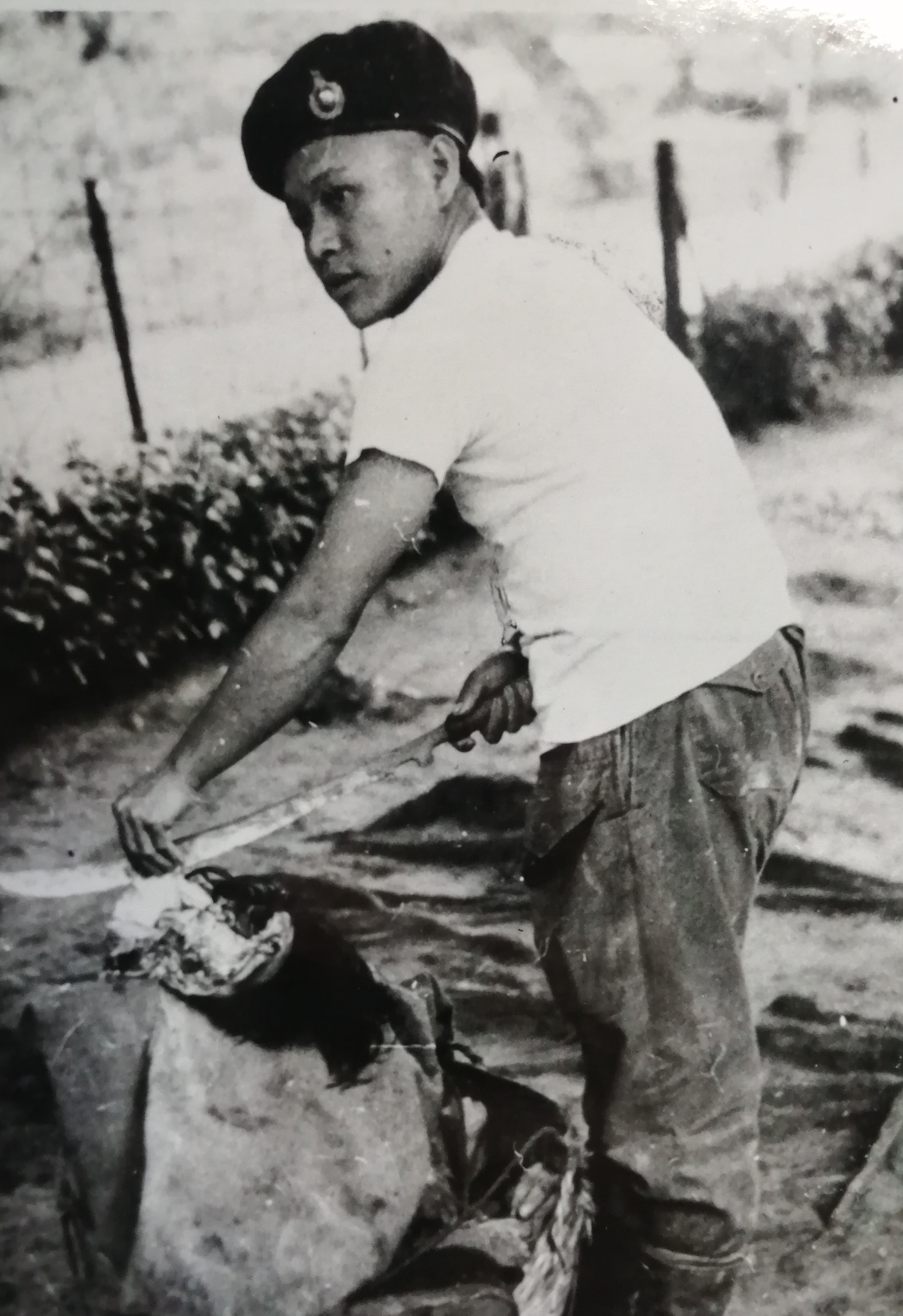
An Iban headhunter during the Malayan Emergency (1948–1960) prepares a human scalp above a container of human body parts.

In the post-war period, during the Malayan Emergency (1948–1960), the British Army enlisted Iban personnel to assist in counterinsurgency operations against the Malayan National Liberation Army (MNLA). These individuals, often with extensive local knowledge and experience as trackers, were attached to British patrols to help navigate the difficult terrain. The involvement of the Iban in these operations became controversial when, in 1952, photographs were published by The Daily Worker (a British communist newspaper) showing Iban personnel and British soldiers posing with severed heads of suspected insurgents. Initially, the British government denied any official sanction for such practices. However, Colonial Secretary Oliver Lyttleton later confirmed that Iban troops had been authorized to engage in these actions as part of their military role. The incident led to the British Malayan headhunting scandal, which attracted widespread criticism. After the conclusion of the conflict, all Dayak troops, including the Iban, were disbanded.

== Ibanic regional groups ==
Map showing the distribution of the Iban language, reflecting the settlement of the Iban people across Borneo, with dark blue indicating areas where it is a majority language and light blue representing regions where it is a minority language

Although Ibans generally speak various dialects which are mutually intelligible, they can be divided into different branches which are named after the geographical areas where they reside.

Sub-ethnic group	Regions with significant population	Note
Kantu'	Upper Kapuas, West Kalimantan	
Ketungau (Sebaru', Demam)	Ketungau River, West Kalimantan	
Mualang	Belitang River, West Kalimantan	
Seberuang	Seberuang and Suhaid Rivers, West Kalimantan	
Desa	Sintang, West Kalimantan	
Iban	Lake Sentarum, West Kalimantan	
Bugau	Kalimantan–Sarawak border	
Ulu Ai (Batang Ai)	Lubok Antu, Sarawak	The first region settled by the Ibans in Sarawak after their migration from Kapuas, West Kalimantan.
Remun	Serian, Sarawak	
Sebuyau	Lundu and Samarahan, Sarawak	
Balau	Sri Aman, Sarawak	
Saribas	Betong, Saratok and parts of Sarikei, Sarawak	
Undup	Undup, Sarawak	
Rajang (Bilak Sedik)	Rajang River, Sibu, Kapit, Belaga, Kanowit, Song, Sarikei, Bintangor, Bintulu, Limbang, Lawas and Miri, Sarawak Belait and Temburong, Brunei	The largest Iban sub-ethnic group
Merotai	Tawau, Sabah	

== Language ==
The Iban language (jaku Iban) is spoken by the Iban, a branch of the Dayak ethnic group formerly known as "Sea Dayak". The language belongs to Malayic languages, which is a Malayo-Polynesian branch of the Austronesian language family. It is thought that the homeland of the Malayic languages is in western Borneo, where the Ibanic languages remain. The Malayic branch represents a secondary dispersal, probably from central Sumatra but possibly also from Borneo.

== Religion ==
Religions of Ibans (Malaysia only)
Religion	Percent
Christianity	76.3%
Folk religion-Animist	8.63%
Islam	6.54%
Other religions	1.35%
No religion / Unknown	5.91%

For hundreds of years, the Iban's ancestors practiced their own traditional custom and pagan religious system. European Christian colonial invaders, after the arrival of James Brooke, led to the influence of European missionaries and conversions to Christianity. Although the majority are now Christian, many continue to observe both Christian and traditional pagan ceremonies, particularly during marriages or festivals, although some ancestral practices such as 'Miring' are still prohibited by certain churches. After being Christianized, the majority of Iban people have changed their traditional name to a Hebrew-based "Christian name" followed by the Ibanese name such as David Dunggau, Joseph Jelenggai, Mary Mayang, etc.

For the majority of Ibans who are Christians, some Christian festivals such as Christmas, Good Friday, Easter are also celebrated. Some Ibans are devout Christians and follow the Christian faith strictly. Since conversion to Christianity, some Iban people celebrate their ancestors' pagan festivals using Christian ways and the majority still observe Gawai Dayak (the Dayak Festival), which is a generic celebration in nature unless a gawai proper is held and thereby preserves their ancestors' culture and tradition.

In Brunei, 1,503 Ibans have converted to Islam from 2009 to 2019 according to official statistics. Many Bruneian Ibans intermarry with Malays and convert to Islam as a result. Bruneian Ibans also often intermarry with the Murut or Christian Chinese due to their shared faith.

Despite the difference in faiths, Ibans of different faiths do live and help each other regardless of faith but some do split their longhouses due to different faiths or even political affiliations. The Ibans believe in helping and having fun together. Some elder Ibans are worried that among most of the younger Iban generation, their culture has faded since the conversion to Christianity and the adoption of a more modern life style. Nevertheless, most Iban embrace modern progress and development.

Many Christian Dayaks have adopted European names, but some continue to maintain their ancestors' traditional names. Since the conversion of most Iban people to Christianity, some have generally abandoned their ancestors' beliefs such as 'Miring' or the celebration of 'Gawai Antu', and many celebrate only Christianized traditional festivals.

Numerous local people and certain missionaries have sought to document and preserve traditional Dayak religious practices. For example, Reverend William Howell contributed numerous articles on the Iban language, lore, and culture between 1909 and 1910 to the Sarawak Gazette. The articles were later compiled in a book in 1963 entitled, The Sea Dayaks and Other Races of Sarawak.

== Culture and customs ==
=== Music ===
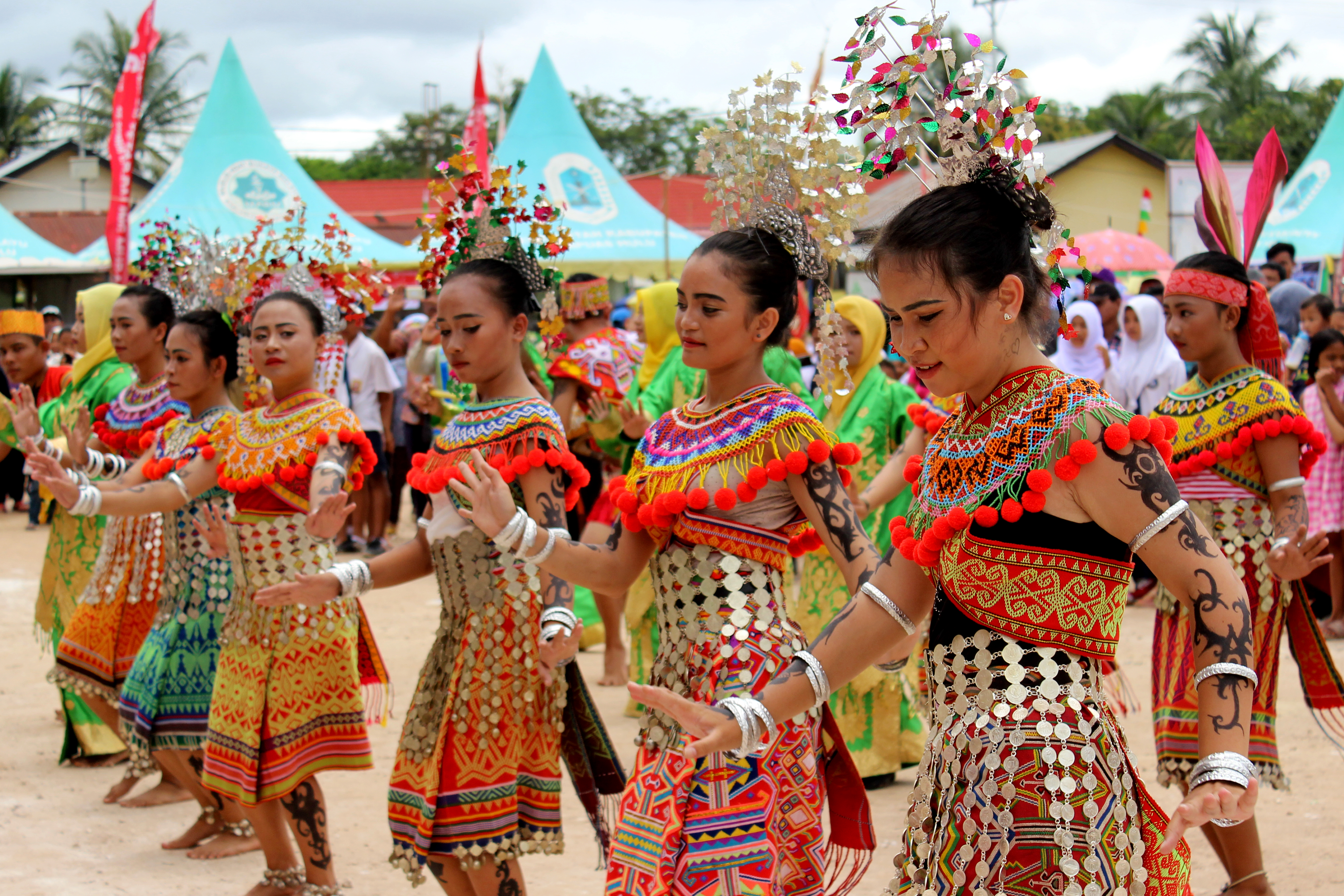
Iban maidens of Kapuas Hulu performing their traditional dance

Iban music is percussion-oriented. The Iban have a musical heritage consisting of various types of agung ensembles – percussion ensembles composed of large hanging, suspended or held, bossed/knobbed gongs which act as drums without any accompanying melodic instrument. The typical Iban agung ensemble will include a set of engkerumung (small gongs arranged together side by side and played like a xylophone), a tawak (the so-called "bass gong"), a bebendai (which acts as a snare) and also a ketebung or bedup (a single sided drum/percussion instrument).

One example of Iban traditional music is the taboh. There are various kinds of taboh (music), depending the purpose and types of ngajat, like alun lundai (slow tempo). The gendang can be played in some distinctive types corresponding to the purpose and type of each ceremony. The most popular ones are called gendang rayah (swinging blow) and gendang pampat (sweeping blow).

=== Handicrafts ===
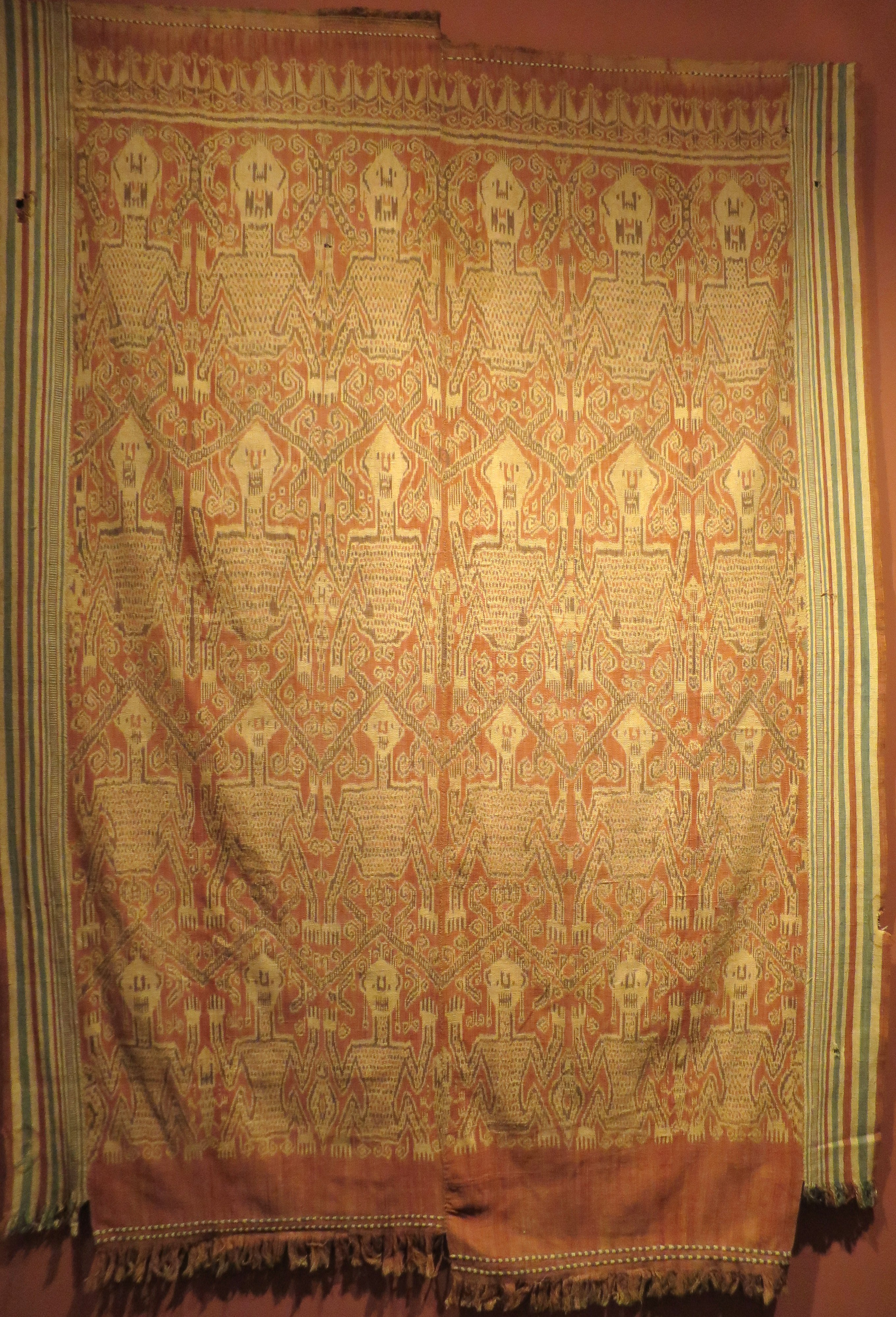
An Iban Pua kombu (ceremonial cloth) from Sarawak being displayed in the Honolulu Museum of Art

Woven products are known as betenun. Several types of woven blankets made by the Ibans are pua kumbu, pua ikat, kain karap and kain sungkit. Using weaving, the Iban make blankets, bird shirts (baju burong), kain kebat, kain betating and selampai. Weaving is the women's warpath while kayau (headhunting) is the men's warpath. The pua kumbu blanket do have conventional or ritual motives depending on the purpose of the woven item. Those who finish the weaving lessons are called tembu kayu (finish the wood). Among well-known ritual motifs are Gajah Meram (Brooding Elephant), Tiang Sandong (Ritual Pole), Meligai (Shrine) and Tiang Ranyai.

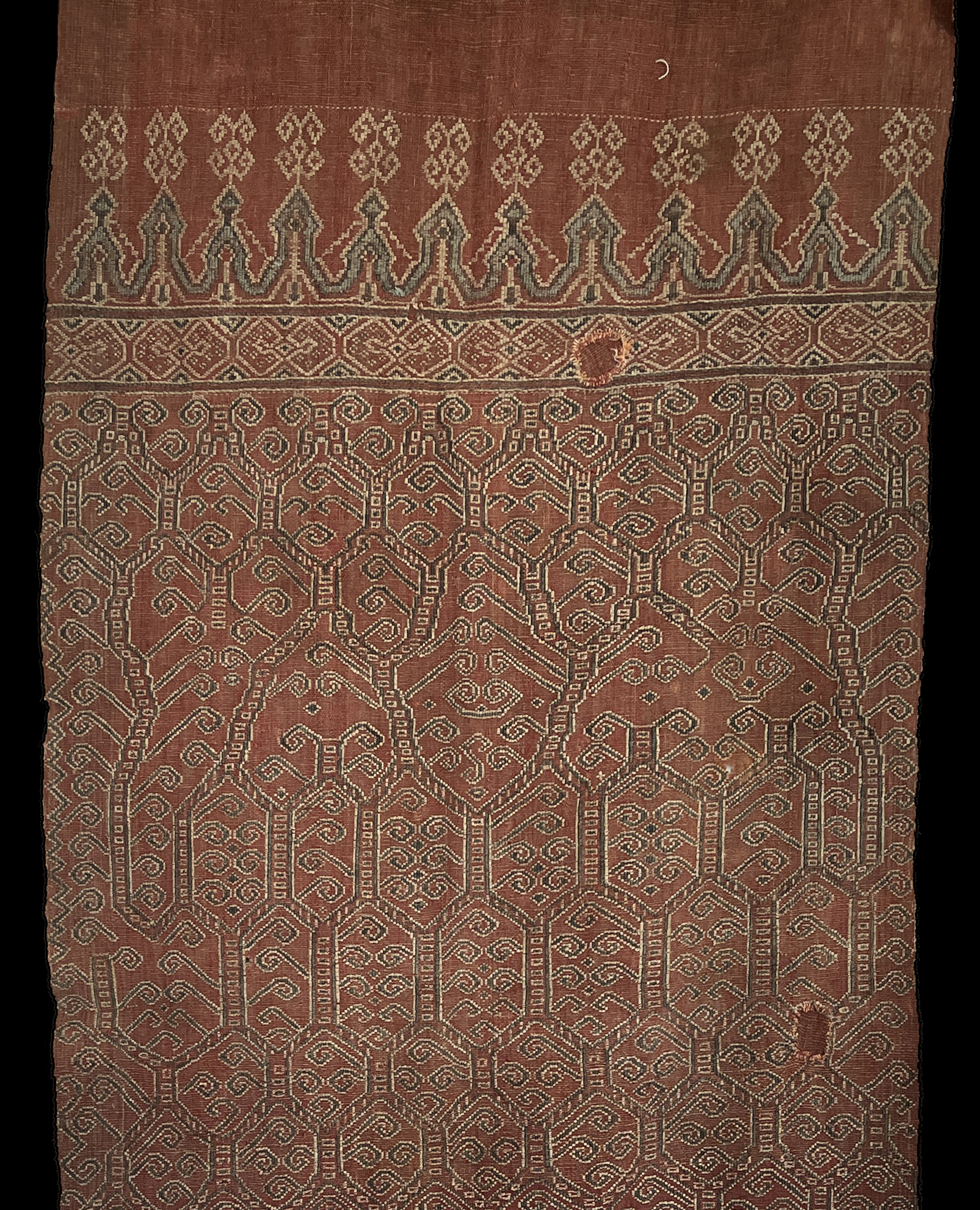
Antique Sungkit Textile from the 1800s, Iban people, Borneo. Courtesy Wovensouls collection, Singapore

=== Land ownership ===
Traditionally, Iban agriculture was based on actual integrated indigenous farming system. Iban Dayaks tend to plant paddy on hill slopes. Agricultural land in this sense was used and defined primarily in terms of hill rice farming, ladang (garden), and hutan (forest). According to Prof Derek Freeman in his Report on Iban Agriculture, Iban Dayaks used to practice twenty-seven stages of hill rice farming once a year and their shifting cultivation practices allow the forest to regenerate itself rather than to damage the forest, thereby to ensure the continuity and sustainability of forest use and/or survival of the Iban community itself. The Iban Dayaks love virgin forests for their dependency on forests but that is for migration, territorial expansion, and/or fleeing enemies.

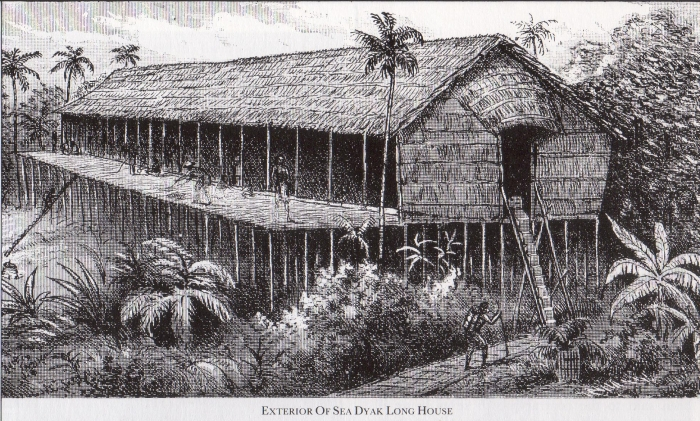
An Iban longhouse, 1896

Once the Iban migrated into a riverine area, they will divide the area into three basic areas i.e. farming area, territorial domain (pemakai menoa) and forest reserve (pulau galau). The farming area is distributed accordingly to each family based on consensus. The chief and elders are responsible to settle any disputes and claims amicably. The territorial domain is a common area where the families of each longhouse are allowed to source for foods and confined themselves without encroachment into domains of other longhouses. The forest reserve is for common use, as a source of natural materials for building longhouse (ramu), boat making, plaiting, etc.

The whole riverine region can consist of many longhouses and thus the entire region belongs to all of them and they shall defend it against encroachment and attack by outsiders. Those longhouses sharing and living in the same riverine region call themselves shared owners (sepemakai).

Each track of virgin forest cleared by each family (rimba) will automatically belong to that family and inherited by its descendants as heirloom (pesaka) unless they migrate to other regions and relinquish their ownership of their land, which is symbolized by a token payment using a simple item in exchange for the land.

=== Agriculture and economy ===
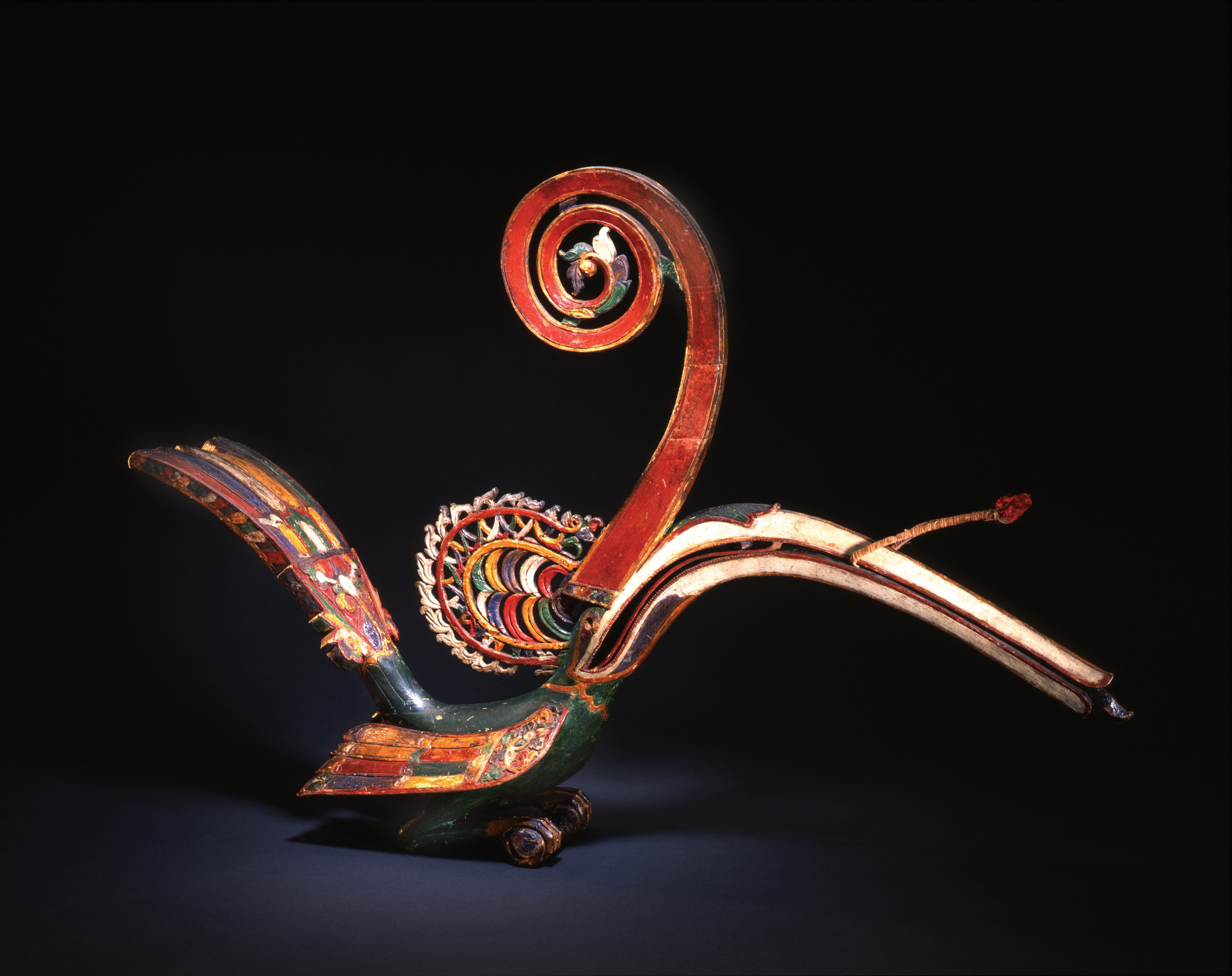
A 19th century Iban carving of a hornbill.

Traditionally, Iban agriculture was based on actual integrated indigenous farming system. Ibans plant hill rice paddies once a year in twenty-seven stages as described by Freeman in his report on Iban Agriculture. Agricultural Land in this sense was used and defined primarily in terms of hill rice farming, ladang (garden), and hutan (forest). The main stages of the paddy cultivation is followed by the Iban lemambang bards to compose their ritual incantations. The bards also analogizes the headhunting expedition with the paddy cultivation stages. Other crops planted include ensabi, cucumber (rampu amat and rampu betu), brinjal, corn, lingkau, millet and cotton (tayak). Downriver Iban plant wet rice paddy at the low-lying riverine areas which are beyond the reach of the salt water tide.

For cash, the Ibans find jungle produce to sell at the market or town. Later, they planted rubber, pepper and cocoa. Nowadays, many Ibans work in towns to seek better sources of income.

Trading is not a natural activity for the Iban. They did trade paddy for jars or salted fish coming from the sea in the old days but paddy lost its economic value a long time ago. Not much yield can be produced from repetitively replanted areas anyway because their planting relies on the natural source of fertilizer from the forest itself and the source of water for irrigation is from the rain, hence the cycle of the weather season is important and need to be correctly followed. Trading of sundries, jungle produce or agricultural produce is normally performed by the Chinese who commuted between the town and the location of the shop.

=== Piracy ===
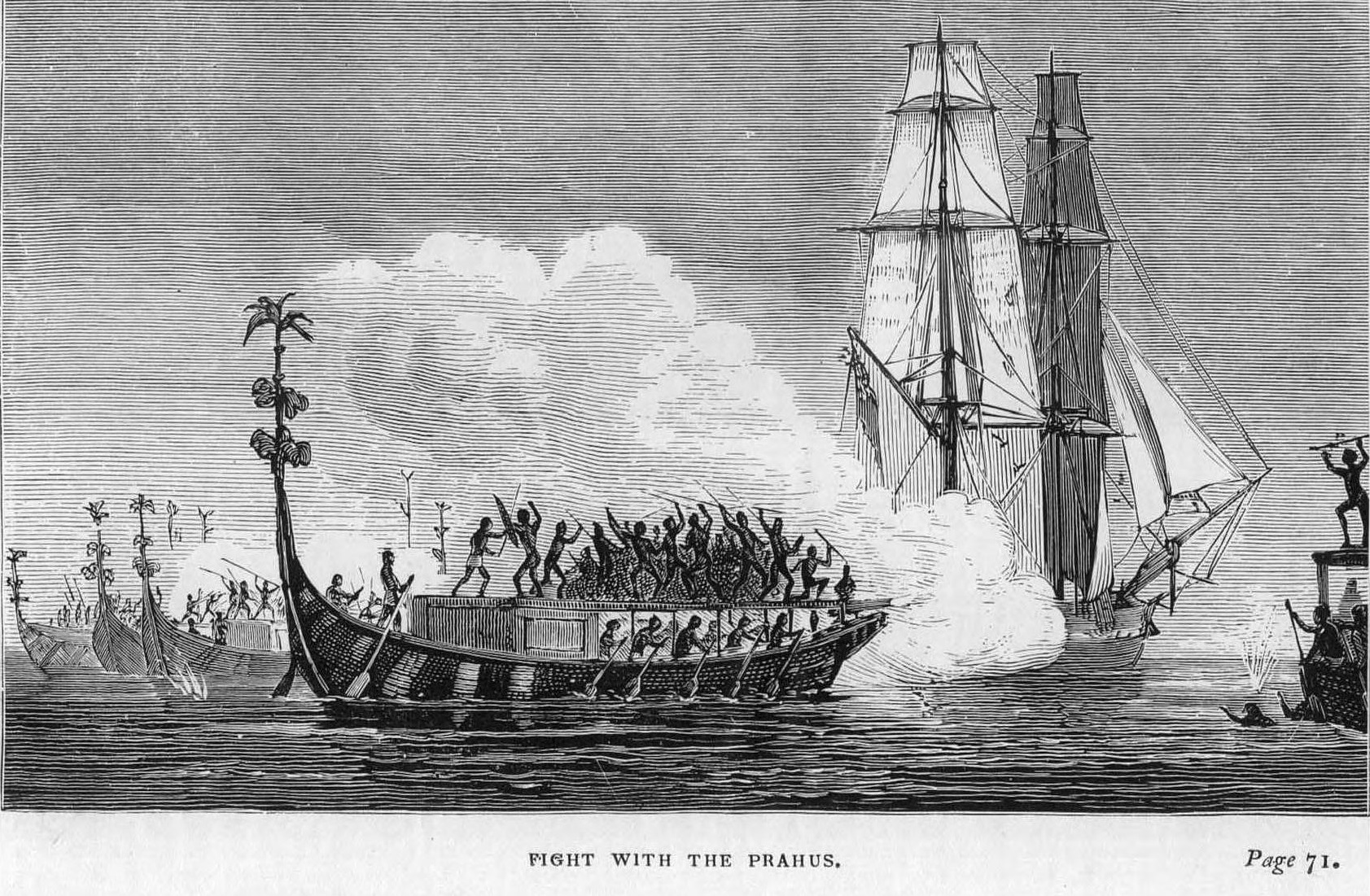
Iban Dayak bangkong fleet attacking brig Lily.

The Sea Dayaks, as their name implies, are a maritime set of tribes, and fight chiefly in canoes and boats. One of their favorite tactics is to conceal some of their larger boats, and then to send some small and badly manned canoes forward to attack the enemy to lure them. The canoes then retreat, followed by the enemy, and as soon as they pass the spot where the larger boats are hidden, they are attacked by them in the rear, while the smaller canoes, which have acted as decoys, turn and join in the fight. The rivers bends are chosen for this kind of attack, the overhanging branches of trees and the dense foliage of the bank affording excellent hiding places for the boats.

Many of the Sea Dayaks were also pirates. In the 19th century there was a great deal of piracy, and it was secretly encouraged by the native rulers, who obtained a share of the spoil, and also by the Malays who knew well how to handle a boat. The Malay fleet consisted of a large number of long war boats or prahu, each about 90 feet (27 m) long or more, and carrying a brass gun in the bow, the pirates being armed with swords, spears and muskets. Each boat was paddled by from 60 to 80 men. These boats skulked about in the sheltered coves waiting for their prey, and attacked merchant vessels making the passage between China and Singapore. The Malay pirates and their Dayak allies would wreck and destroy every trading vessel they came across, murder most of the crew who offered any resistance, and the rest were made as slaves. The Dayak would cut off the heads of those who were slain, smoke them over the fire to dry them, and then take them home to treasure as valued possessions.

=== Military history ===
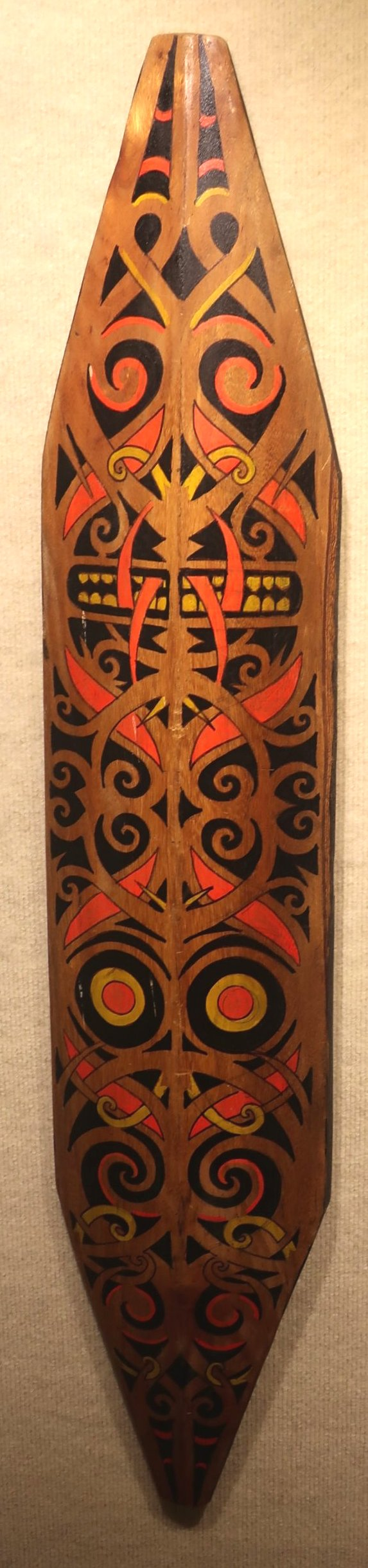
Iban shield with 'tree of life' design from Sarawak

A Dayak war party in proas and canoes fought a battle with Murray Maxwell following the wreck of HMS Alceste in 1817 at the Gaspar Strait.

The Iban Dayak's first direct encounter with the Brooke and his men was in 1843, during the attack by Brooke's forces on the Batang Saribas region i.e. Padeh, Paku, and Rimbas respectively. The finale of this battle was the conference at Nagna Sebuloh to sign a peace Saribas treaty to end piracy and headhunting but the natives refused to sign it, rendering the treaty moot.

In 1844, Brooke's force attacked Batang Lupar, Batang Undop, and Batang Skrang to defeat the Malay sharifs and Dayak living in these regions. The Malay sharifs were easily defeated at Patusin in Batang Lupar, without a major fight despite their famous reputation and power over the native inlanders. However, during the battle of Batang Undop, one of Brooke's men, British Navy officer Mr. Charles Wade was killed in action at the battle of Ulu Undop while chasing the Malay sheriffs upriver. Subsequently, Brooke's Malay force headed by Datu Patinggi Ali and Mr. Steward was totally defeated by the Skrang Iban force at the battle of Kerangan Peris in the Batang Skrang region.

In 1849, at the Battle of Beting Maru, a convoy of Dayak boats that were returning from a sojourn at the River Rajan spotted Brooke's man of war, the Nemesis. They then landed on the Beting Maru sandbar and retreated to their villages, with two Dayak boats acting as a diversion by sailing towards the Nemesis and engaging her, with the two boats managing to retreat safely after a few shots were exchanged. The next day, the Dayak ambushed Brooke's pursuing force, killing two of Brooke's Iban entourage before pulling back.

Layang, the son-in-law of Libau "Rentap" was known as the first Iban slayer of a white man in the person of Mr. Alan Lee "Ti Mati Rugi" (died in vain) at the Battle of Lintang Batang in 1853, above the Skrang fort built by Brooke in 1850. The Brooke government had to launch three successive punitive expeditions against Libau Rentap to conquer his fortress known as Sadok Mount. In total, the Brooke government conducted 52 punitive expeditions against the Iban including one against the Kayan.

The Sarawak Rangers which were mostly Dayak participated in the anti-communist insurgency during the Malayan Emergency between 1948 and 1960. The Sarawak Rangers were despatched by the British to fight during the Brunei Rebellion in 1962.

== Military contributions ==
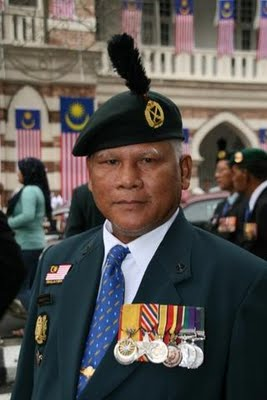
Kanang anak Langkau, a Malaysian war hero

The Iban are famous for being fearsome warriors in the past in defence of homeland or for migration to virgin territories. Two highly decorated Iban Dayak soldiers from Sarawak in Malaysia are Temenggung Datuk and Kanang anak Langkau (awarded the Seri Pahlawan Gagah Perkasa or Grand Knight of Valour) and Awang anak Raweng of Skrang (awarded a George Cross). So far, only one Dayak has reached the rank of general in the military, Brigadier-General Stephen Mundaw in the Malaysian Army, who was promoted on 1 November 2010.

Malaysia's most decorated war hero is Kanang Anak Langkau for his military service helping to liberate Malaya (and later Malaysia) from the communists, being the only soldier awarded both Seri Pahlawan (The Star of the Commander of Valour) and Panglima Gagah Berani (The Star of Valour). Among all the heroes are 21 holders of the Panglima Gagah Berani (PGB) including 2 recipients of the Seri Pahlawan. Of this total, there are 14 Ibans, two Chinese army officers, one Bidayuh, one Kayan and one Malay. But the majority of the Armed Forces are Malays, according to a book – Crimson Tide over Borneo. The youngest of the PGB holders is ASP Wilfred Gomez of the police force.

There were six holders of Sri Pahlawan (SP) and Panglima Gagah Perkasa from Sarawak, and with the death of Kanang Anak Langkau, there is one SP holder in the person of Sgt. Ngalinuh (an Orang Ulu).

== In popular culture ==
- The episode "Into the Jungle" from Anthony Bourdain: No Reservations included the appearance of Itam, a former Sarawak Ranger and one of the Iban people's last members with the entegulun (Iban traditional hand tattoos) signifying his taking of an enemy's head.
- The film The Sleeping Dictionary features Selima (Jessica Alba), an Anglo-Iban girl who falls in love with John Truscott (Hugh Dancy). The movie was filmed primarily in Sarawak, Malaysia.
- Malaysian singer Noraniza Idris released "Ngajat Tampi" in 2000, followed by "Tandang Bermadah" in 2002, both inspired by traditional Iban music compositions. These songs gained popularity in Malaysia and neighboring countries.
- Chinta Gadis Rimba (or Love of a Forest Maiden), a 1958 film directed by L. Krishnan and based on the novel by Harun Aminurrashid, tells the story of an Iban girl named Bintang who defies her parents' wishes and runs away with her Malay lover. This film marks the first full-length feature to be shot in Sarawak and the first time an Iban woman played the lead role
- Bejalai is a 1987 film directed by Stephen Teo, notable for being the first film to be made in the Iban language and also the first Malaysian film to be selected for the Berlin International Film Festival. The film is an experimental feature about the custom among the Iban young men to do a "bejalai" (go on a journey) before attaining maturity.
- In Farewell to the King, a 1969 novel by Pierre Schoendoerffer plus its subsequent 1989 film adaptation, the prisoner-of-war Learoyd escapes a Japanese firing squad by hiding in the wilds of Borneo, where he is adopted by an Iban community.
- In 2007, Malaysian company Maybank produced a wholly Iban-language commercial commemorating Malaysia's 50th anniversary of independence. The advert, directed by Yasmin Ahmad with help of the Leo Burnett agency, was shot in Bau and Kapit and used an all-Sarawakian cast.
- A conflict between a proa of "sea-dyaks" and the shipwrecked Jack Aubrey and his crew forms much of the first part of The Nutmeg of Consolation (1991), Patrick O'Brian's fourteenth Aubrey-Maturin novel.

== Notable people ==
=== Tribal chiefs ===
- Koh anak Jubang, first Paramount Chief of the Ibans

=== Academia ===
- Benedict Sandin, historian and academic

=== Entertainment ===
- Henry Golding, Hollywood actor; has an English father and Iban mother
- Nicole Constantine, Emmy-winning talent manager; has an Australian father and Iban mother

=== Military figures ===
- Kanang anak Langkau, awarded the Star of the Commander of Valour by the Malaysian government
- Rentap, leader of a rebellion against the Brooke government and used the title of Raja Ulu (King of the Interior)

=== Beauty pageant titleholder ===
- Francisca Luhong James, Miss Universe Malaysia 2020; has an Orang Ulu father and Iban mother

=== Politicians ===
- Jugah Barieng, second Paramount Chief of the Dayak people and the key signatory on behalf of Sarawak to the Malaysia Agreement
- Stephen Kalong Ningkan, the first Chief Minister of Sarawak
- Tawi Sli, the second Chief Minister of Sarawak
- Doris Sophia Brodi, Members of Parliament (MP) for Sri Aman and (the first woman) & former Deputy Speaker of Dewan Negara (2012–2016)

=== Sports personalities ===
- Jimmy Anak Ahar, Brunei athlete
- Philip Anak Ahar, Brunei football player
- Hardi Anak Bujang, Brunei football player
- Mardi Anak Bujang, Brunei football player
- Haimie Anak Nyaring, Brunei football player
- Suhaimi Anak Sulau, Brunei football player
- Sapok Biki - Leftenan Muda and Gold commenwealth 1998

=== Others ===
- Kho Jabing, a Sarawakian of mixed Chinese and Iban descent who was executed in Singapore for murder

== See also ==
- Demographics of Sarawak
- History of Sarawak
- Iban culture
- Gawai Dayak
- View of the tiger

== General bibliography ==
- Sir Steven Runciman, The White Rajahs: a history of Sarawak from 1841 to 1946 (1960).
- James Ritchie, The Life Story of Temenggong Koh (1999)
- Benedict Sandin, Gawai Burong: The chants and celebrations of the Iban Bird Festival (1977)
- Greg Verso, Blackboard in Borneo, (1989)
- Renang Anak Ansali, New Generation of Iban, (2000)
