= Diocese of Miri =

Latin Catholic diocese in Malaysia

Diocese of Miri Dioecesis Miriensis: Keuskupan Miri; 美里教区

Catholic
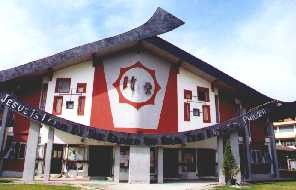
- Front View of St Joseph's Cathedral Miri in 2003

- Coat of arms

Location
- Country: Malaysia
- Territory: Miri; Bintulu; Limbang; Lawas; Tatau; Marudi; Baram
- Episcopal conference: Catholic Bishops' Conference of Malaysia, Singapore and Brunei
- Ecclesiastical province: Kuching
- Metropolitan: Kuching

Statistics
- Area: 66,135 km^{2} (25,535 sq mi) (Note: Annuario Pontificio (2023) via Catholic-Hierarchy.org)
- Population: Total; Catholics: (as of 2023); 947,600; 117,930 (12.4%)
- Parishes: 15

Information
- Denomination: Catholic Church
- Sui iuris church: Latin Church
- Rite: Roman Rite
- Established: December 19, 1959; 66 years ago (apostolic vicariate); May 31, 1976; 50 years ago (diocese)
- Cathedral: St Joseph's Cathedral, Miri
- Patron saint: Saint Joseph
- Language: Ecclesiastical Latin; English; Iban; Cantonese; Mandarin; Malay; Hakka; Kenyah; Kayan; Punan; Teochew; Bukitan; Foochow; Lun Bawang; Bisaya; Kelabit; Melanau; Penan; Berawan

Current leadership
- Pope: Leo XIV
- Bishop: Richard Ng
- Metropolitan Archbishop: Simon Peter Poh Hoon Seng
- Vicar General: Joseph Ding Leo
- Bishops emeritus: Anthony Lee Kok Hin

Website
- rcdmiri.org

The Diocese of Miri (Latin: Dioecesis Mirensis; Malay: Keuskupan Miri; Chinese: 美里教区) is a Latin Church diocese of the Catholic Church in Malaysia, situated northeast of the Archdiocese of Kuching, to which it is a suffragan diocese. St. Joseph's Cathedral in Miri serves as both the diocesan cathedral and the seat of bishop. The diocese covers Miri, Bintulu, Limbang, Lawas, Tatau and Marudi. Brunei, formerly part of the diocese, has been separated from it on 21 November 1997 as an apostolic vicariate of its own.

In 1959, when the vicariate was established, Anthony Denis Galvin, a Mill Hill priest, was appointed as the apostolic vicar (later bishop) until his sudden death on 5 September 1976. Anthony Lee Kok Hin, a local priest from Miri, become the first local bishop of Miri on 30 May 1977. In 2013, following his resignation, Pope Francis appointed Richard Ng, a Kuching-born priest, as his successor and he was installed as the second bishop of this diocese in 2014.

== Parishes ==
- St Joseph Cathedral, Jalan Angsana, Miri
  - Rector: Rev. Ronald Jimmy
  - Assistant(s): Rev. Justin Dan, Rev. Gabriel Chiong, Rev. Vincent Shim, Rev. Jack Nayak, CMF (Claretians missionary from India), Rev. John Chua, OCD (Discalced Carmelite from Singapore), Rev. Peter Mering and Rev. Sylvester Ding Ibau
    - sub-parishes of Church of Mater Dei, Lutong, Miri
    - St. Anthony of Padua Church, Tudan, Miri
    - Holy Spirit Church, Permyjaya, Miri
    - Carmelite Chapel, Brighton Road, Miri
    - Holy Rosary Chapel, Piasau Utara, Miri
    - Sts. Peter and Paul Chapel, Bakam, Miri
- St Dominic and the Rosary Parish, Taman Tunku, Miri
  - Rector: Rev. Andy Lee
  - Assistant(s): Rev. Philip Empalah
    - sub-parish of Ave Maria Church, Lambir, Miri
- St Michael the Archangel Parish, Batu Niah, Miri
  - Rector: Rev. Kevin Chundi
  - Assistant(s): Rev. Neppolian
- Holy Family Parish, Lapok, Miri
  - Rector: Rev. Michael Sia
  - Assistant(s): Rev. Joel Rut Markus & Rev. Jérémie Efumo Liyandja, MHM (Mill Hill missionary from Democratic Republic of the Congo)
    - sub-parishes of the Church of Body and Blood of Christ, Bakong, Miri
    - St. Teresa Church, Ulu Teru, Lapok
    - St. John Church, Sebatang, Lapok
    - Risen Christ Church, Long Jegan
    - St. Mary Church, Long Aya, Ulu Tinjar
    - St. Faustina Kowalska Church, Long Liaw, Tinjar
- Mother Mary Parish, Bukit Peninjau, Miri
  - Rector: Rev. Peter Hwang Yiek Siong
  - Assistant(s): Rev. Arokia Paul Raj Antony, CMF (Claretians missionary from India)
    - sub-parishes of St. Mark the Evangelist Church, Sg. Tiris, Miri
    - St. Basil the Great Church, Sg. Entulang, Miri
    - St. Paul Church, Sg. Biar, Miri
- St Anthony Parish, Bintulu
  - Rector: Rev. Martin Vincent Sta
  - Assistant(s): Rev. Henry Saleh & Rev. Glenn T. Flores, MHM (Mill Hill missionary from the Philippines)
    - sub-parishes of St. John Church, Setiam, Bintulu
    - Stella Maris Church, Kidurong, Bintulu
    - St. Boniface Church, Mile 15, Bintulu-Miri Road, Bintulu
    - House of the Presentation of the Lord, Sg. Plan, Bintulu
- St George Parish, Sebauh, Bintulu
  - Rector: Rev. Alexander Anantharaj, CMF (Claretians missionary from India)
  - Assistant(s): --
- St Peter Parish, Tatau
  - Rector: Rev. Chevalier Cyril John, MHM (Mill Hill missionary from India)
  - Assistant(s): Rev. Anil Kumar Kocherla, MHM (Mill Hill missionary from India)
- St Francis Xavier Parish, Belaga
  - Rector: Rev. S. K. Selvan, CMF (Claretians missionary from India)
  - Assistant(s): --
    - sub-parish of St. Francis of Assisi Church, Long Tanyit, Sg. Linau, Belaga
- Blessed Sacrament Parish, Long Lama
  - Rector: Rev. Sylvester Ngau Juk
  - Assistant(s): --
    - sub-parsihes of St. John Church, Long Miri
    - St. Mary Church, Uma Bawang
    - Our Lady of the Assumption Church, Sg. Dua, Long Lama
    - Christ the Saviour Church, Long Banyok
    - St. John Church, Long Puak
- Holy Cross Parish, Sungai Asap, Belaga
  - Rector: Rev. Mgsr. Joseph Ding Leo (Vicar general)
  - Assistant(s): --
    - sub-parishes of St. Luke the Evangelist Church & Parish Office & Priest House, Uma Belor
    - St. Paul Church/St. Paul's Pilgrimage Hill, Tubau
    - Immaculate Conception Church, Uma Bawang, Sungai Asap
    - St. John Church, Uma Balui, Liko
    - St. Ambrose Church, Uma Lahanan
    - St. Joseph Church, Uma Badeng, Koyan
    - St. Francis of Assisi Church, Rh. Anthony Lerang, Uma Badeng, Apu Damai, Long Urun
    - St. Teresa Church, Uma Seping, Long Bala
- St Paul Parish, Long San
  - Rector: Rev. Nelson Zang Kum, MHM (Mill Hill missionary from Cameroon)
  - Assistant(s): --
    - sub-parishes of St. Mary Church, Lepo Gah, Tg. Tepalit, Long Selatong
    - Emmanuel Church, Long Apu
    - Long Jelutan Catholic Church
    - St. John Church, Long Anap
    - St. Peter Church, Long Palai
    - St. Mary Church, Long Moh
    - St. Peter Church, Long Sobing
    - St. Paul Church, Long Aton
    - St. Anthony Church, Long Nibong
    - St. Peter Church, Long Pilah
    - St. Agnes Church, Long Semiyang
    - St. Paul Church, Long Tungan
    - St. Matthew the Apostle Church, Lio Mato
    - Church of the Divine Mercy, Apau Nyaring
    - St. Stephen Church, Long Tebanyi
    - St. Francis of Assisi Church, Long Keluan
    - St. Walter Church, Long Julan Pelutan
    - St. John Church, Long Selatong Dekan
- Good Shepherd Parish, Marudi
  - Rector: Rev. John Chong (outstationed from the Archdiocese of Kuching)
  - Assistant(s): --
    - sub-parishes of St. Basil the Great Church, Rh. Gudang, Marudi
    - Sacred Heart of Jesus Church, Lubok Nibong, Marudi
- St Edmund Parish, Limbang
  - Rector: Rev. Damian Lalo Thomas
  - Assistants: Rev. Johnny Francis Ho Fung Fei
    - sub-parishes of St. Martin Church, Lawas
    - Mother Mary Church, Kubong, Limbang
    - St. Michael the Archangel Church, Medamit, Limbang
    - St. John the Apostle Church, Liok Batu, Limbang
    - St. Anthony Church, Batu Danau, Limbang
    - St. James Church, Lembuak, Limbang
    - St. Mary the Rosary Church, Pengkalan Jawa, Limbang
    - St. Paul Church, Tg. Riman, Bukid Gudang, Limbang (formerly Mother Mary Church, Tg. Riman, Bukid Gudang)

== Ordinaries ==
No.	Portrait	Name	Period in office	Insignia
1		Anthony Denis Galvin, MHM (1919–1976)	5 April 1960 – 5 September 1976	
2		Anthony Lee Kok Hin (born 1935)	30 May 1977 – 30 October 2013	
3		Richard Ng (born 1966)	25 January 2014 – Present	

== Religious communities ==
- Mill Hill Missionaries (MHM)
- Discalced Carmelites (OCD)
- Claretians (CMF)
- Order of Friars Minor (OFM)
- Sisters of St. Francis of Sarawak (SSFS)

== Misisonary schools ==
=== Primary ===
- SK St Joseph, Miri
- SK St Anthony, Bintulu
- SK St Edmund, Limbang
- SK Good Shepherd, Marudi
- SK RC Kubong, Limbang
- SK St Pius, Long San

=== Secondary ===
- SMK St Joseph, Miri

== See also ==
- Catholic Church in Malaysia
