= Tatau District =

District of Sarawak, Malaysia

Tatau
- District
- Flag

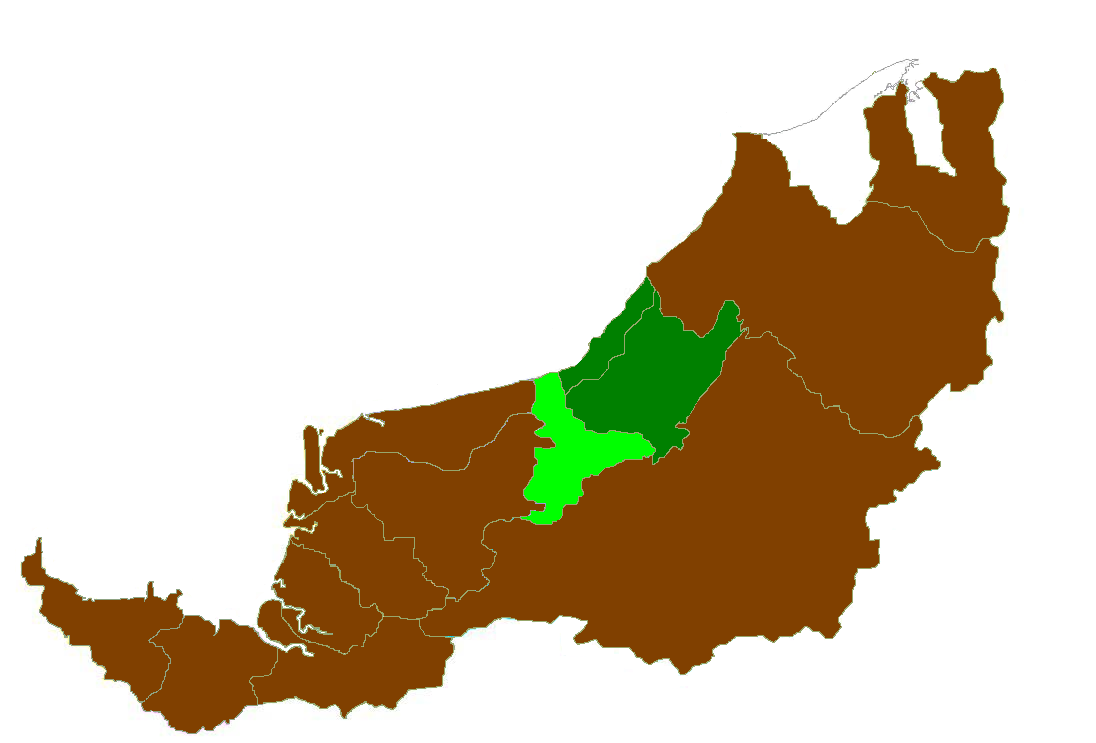
- Coordinates: 2.6667°N 113°E
- District Office location: Bintulu
- Local area government (s): Lembaga Kemajuan Bintulu (BDA)

Government
  - District Officer: Calvin Ligong Anak Bujang @ Endawie (since 2025 until now)

Area
  - Total: 4,945.80 km^{2} (1,909.58 sq mi)

Population (2024)
  - Total: 48,268
  - Density: 9.8/km^{2} (25/sq mi)

Ethnicity
  - Iban: 81.3%
  - Malays: 9.5%
  - Chinese: 5.8%
  - Orang Ulu: 1.4%
  - Melanau: 1.2%

Map of Tatau District

Tatau District is one of the two districts of Bintulu Division in Sarawak, Malaysia. It has a total area of 4,945.80 square kilometres. The largest town in the district is Tatau.

== History ==
Tatau River was once under the control of the Bruneian Empire until 1861 when it was ceded to James Brooke and became part of the Raj of Sarawak.

== Demography ==
The population of Tatau District (based on recent 2023 census) was 48,268.

=== Ethnics ===
Ethnic composition of Tatau District (2024)
| Ethnicities / Nationality | Percentage |
| Malays | 9.58% |
| Iban | 81.39% |
| Bidayuh | 0.04% |
| Melanau | 1.21% |
| Other Bumiputeras | 1.48% |
| Chinese | 5.87% |
| Indians | 0% |
| Others | 0% |
| Non-Malaysian | 0.44% |

| Ethnicity | 2024 | |
| Ethnicity | Pop. | % |
|---|---|---|
| Malays | 4625 | 9.58% |
| Iban | 39287 | 81.39% |
| Bidayuh | 19 | 0.04% |
| Melanau | 582 | 1.21% |
| Other Bumiputeras | 714 | 1.48% |
| Chinese | 2831 | 5.87% |
| Indians | 0 | 0% |
| Others | 0 | 0% |
| Malaysian total | 48058 | 99.56% |
| Non-Malaysian | 210 | 0.44% |
| Total | 48268 | 100.00% |

Historical population
| Year | Pop. | ±% |
|---|---|---|
| 1980 | 11,670 | — |
| 1985 | 15,108 | +29.5% |
| 1990 | 20,134 | +33.3% |
| 1995 | 24,875 | +23.5% |
| 2004 | 28,322 | +13.9% |
| 2010 | 34,120 | +20.5% |
| 2015 | 40,395 | +18.4% |
| 2024 | 48,268 | +19.5% |

Tatau is traditionally a home to Iban, Melanau, Chinese, Malay and Orang Ulu people. There is one ethnic group named "Tatau" which is unique to Tatau district.

Most Ibans are scattered throughout rural areas of Tatau. Whilst, Melanau people (or Melanau Bintulu/Vaie people) and Malay people are concentrated at Tatau and Kuala Tatau. Many Malay people are not originally from Tatau, however, intermarriage with locals especially Melanau people has made Malay as one of the major ethnics in Tatau. Chinese people are more concentrated at Tatau, while some reside at Sangan and Kuala Tatau. The Orang Ulu people, such as Kenyah, Kayan, Tatau, Penan and Punan are more scattered throughout Tatau district compared to the Iban people. Most of them still live deep in the rural areas like Ng. Tau, Kuala Baggiau and Sungai Anap.

There is a large influx of foreign worker population due to the timber industry. It was estimated more than 10% of Tatau population are foreign workers, most of whom come from Indonesia.

== Economy ==
The economy is largely based on the timber and agricultural industries. Timber industry remains a strong component of the district's economy. Agriculture is relatively minor although growing steadily, with oil palm, rattan and pepper the main products.

== Transportation ==
Although Tatau is well connected to other parts of Sarawak with good networks of road, river transports still play the vital role in Bintulu. People of Tatau District can opt for regular shuttle bus service to Bintulu town, where then connected to other parts of Bintulu Division. The only shuttle bus operating for both town and rural services is Jepak Holding.

As for people who wish to travel to upriver areas which are inaccessible by road such as Kuala Serupai, Kuala Baggiau and Sungai Anap, they have to use available ferry and boat services. River transport charges remain high in Tatau District due to the long distance of the upriver areas.

There are some rural areas which are accessible by timber tracks and palm estate roads such as Kakus. Availability of transports to these areas are limited through bookings at Bintulu town or rarely at Tatau town, using private vans or four-wheel drive vehicles.

== Infrastructure ==
Pan-Borneo Highway is a trunk road linking Tatau District to the rest of Sarawak.

=== Education ===
Tatau District has a moderate number of public schools. There is only one public secondary school for Tatau District. As for primary schools, most of them are scattered throughout Tatau. Most of them are located deep in the Tatau District's interior to cater for rural students. Most of the schools are partially boarding school due to the scattered population of Tatau District.

=== Healthcare ===
Tatau has its own health clinic with a qualified doctor. However, as for surgeries and more critical cases, they are normally referred to Bintulu Hospital, or to greater extent, Sarawak General Hospital in Kuching.

=== Security ===
Tatau District has a police district office. There are also police stations and posts located at strategic locations, as well as rural areas. Despite being the third largest division, Bintulu Division, as well as Tatau District, has no major military presence. There are only small military camps scattered throughout the division.

=== Government services ===
Other government offices have set up their branches in both Bintulu and Tatau district (some at Sebauh sub-district and other smaller communal areas) such as Royal Customs, Fire and Rescue Department, Education Department, etc.

== See also ==
- Sarawak
- Bintulu Division
- Bintulu District
- Sebauh Sub-district
