= Balingian =

Other transcription(s)
  - Chinese: 万年烟
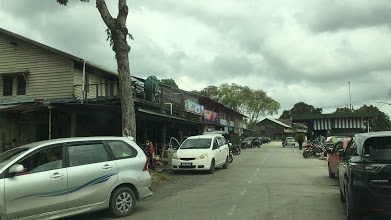
- Balingian old bazaar seen in February 2019

- Location within Borneo
- Coordinates: 2.91667°N 112.53333°E
- Country: Malaysia
- State: Sarawak
- Elevation: 3 m (9.8 ft)
- Website: www.mukah.sarawak.gov.my

Balingian also known as Kuala Balingian is a town in Sarawak, Malaysia. It lies approximately 286.1 kilometres (178 mi) east-north-east of the state capital Kuching.

== Etymology ==
Baligian got its name from a river crossing the town. The river was once used by the local residents to go to their hill paddy fields.

== Government ==
The Balingian sub-district is administered by a Sarawak Administrative Officer (SAO) and three Penghulu (regional chief). Administrative areas of Balingian sub-district includes Balingian delta, Arip river, Bawan river, and Bawang Assan river, all under the administration of Dalat and Mukah District Council (MDDM).

== Geography ==
Balingian is located inside the Balingian sub-district, about 60 km from Mukah town. The Balingian sub-district is measured as 3,032 km^{2}. The town of Balingian is located between the Mukah town and the Bintulu town. It takes one hour to go to Mukah from Balingian and three hours to go to Sibu. Balingian can also be reached through the sea from Tatau and Bintulu. There is also a coastal road connecting Balingian to the mouth of the Balingian river and Tatau. Neighbouring settlements include:

- Lemai 26.2 kilometres (16.3 mi) south
- Kuala Tatau 33.4 kilometres (20.8 mi) northeast
- Penipah 35.4 kilometres (22.0 mi) west
- Tatau 35.4 kilometres (22.0 mi) east
- Kenyana 39.9 kilometres (24.8 mi) west
- Penakub 42.8 kilometres (26.6 mi) west
- Rumah Kelambu 44 kilometres (27.3 mi) east
- Kampung Jebungan 44.5 kilometres (27.7 mi) west
- Mukah 48.2 kilometres (30.0 mi) west
- Rumah Nyawai 49.9 kilometres (31.0 mi) south

== Climate ==
Balingian has a tropical rainforest climate (Af) with heavy to very heavy rainfall year-round.

Climate data for Balingian
Month	Jan	Feb	Mar	Apr	May	Jun	Jul	Aug	Sep	Oct	Nov	Dec	Year
Mean daily maximum °C (°F)	29.7 (85.5)	29.8 (85.6)	30.6 (87.1)	31.3 (88.3)	31.7 (89.1)	31.5 (88.7)	31.5 (88.7)	31.1 (88.0)	31.2 (88.2)	30.9 (87.6)	30.7 (87.3)	30.3 (86.5)	30.9 (87.6)
Daily mean °C (°F)	26.0 (78.8)	26.1 (79.0)	26.6 (79.9)	27.1 (80.8)	27.4 (81.3)	27.1 (80.8)	27.0 (80.6)	26.7 (80.1)	26.9 (80.4)	26.8 (80.2)	26.7 (80.1)	26.3 (79.3)	26.7 (80.1)
Mean daily minimum °C (°F)	22.4 (72.3)	22.5 (72.5)	22.7 (72.9)	22.9 (73.2)	23.2 (73.8)	22.8 (73.0)	22.5 (72.5)	22.4 (72.3)	22.6 (72.7)	22.7 (72.9)	22.7 (72.9)	22.4 (72.3)	22.6 (72.8)
Average rainfall mm (inches)	470 (18.5)	356 (14.0)	311 (12.2)	226 (8.9)	210 (8.3)	230 (9.1)	197 (7.8)	260 (10.2)	279 (11.0)	316 (12.4)	340 (13.4)	469 (18.5)	3,664 (144.3)
Source: Climate-Data.org

== Demographics ==
According to the Balingian public health clinic estimation, Balingian town has a total population of 15,327 people in 2002. It consists of Iban people (68.3%) and Melanau people (29.49%). All the populations stay in six villages and 137 longhouses.

== Economy ==
Majority of the residents here manage their own shophouses and individual stalls in bazaar. A bazaar is held every weekend selling daily necessities and agricultural produce. The establishment of Regional Growth Centre (RGC), Sarawak Oil-Palm Plantation (SOP), FELCRA Berhad allows the local people to involve in large scale oil palm plantations. Other economic activities in Balingian include: sago, rice, and coconut cultivation, fish and chicken domestication, and logging. Coal mining has been ongoing in the Balingian coal field. Balingian coal-fired power plant commenced operation since May 2019. It is the first plant in Malaysia to use circulating fluidized bed technology to handle various coal types.

Under Sarawak Corridor of Renewable Energy (SCORE); an aluminium smelting plant located at about 25 km from Balingian was built. Offshore oil and gas is also a growth area for Balingian.

== Transport ==
=== Road ===
Coastal road has improved Balingian link to other towns, especially those who went to Mukah and Bintulu (via Kuala Tatau).

== Other utilities ==
=== Education ===
Amongst the schools available here are: SRK Parish (Parish primary school), SRB Chung Hua (Chung Hua primary school), Perpaduan kindergarten, Sedidik kindergarten and the upcoming SMK Balingian.

=== Healthcare ===
Balingian public health clinic was established in 1989. The clinic also has implemented a Teleprimary care (TPC) system. It is an audiovisual system where patients can be assessed and treated remotely without being sent to the nearby hospitals.

== Culture and leisure ==
Balingian is known for its river shrimps and have become an attraction for anglers.
