= Ukit language =

Punan language of Sarawak, Malaysia

Ukit
- Native to: Malaysia
- Region: Sarawak
- Ethnicity: Ukit
- Native speakers: (120 cited 1981)
- Language family: Austronesian: Malayo-Polynesian; Greater North Borneo languages; Central Sarawak; Punan–Müller-Schwaner; Punan; Ukit

Language codes
- ISO 639-3: umi
- Glottolog: ukit1237
- ELP: Ukit

Ukit is a Punan language of Sarawak, Malaysia.

'Punan Ukit' is a dialect of the related language Bukitan.
