= Koh anak Jubang =

Iban tribal leader (1870-1956)

Temenggong Koh anak Jubang MBE
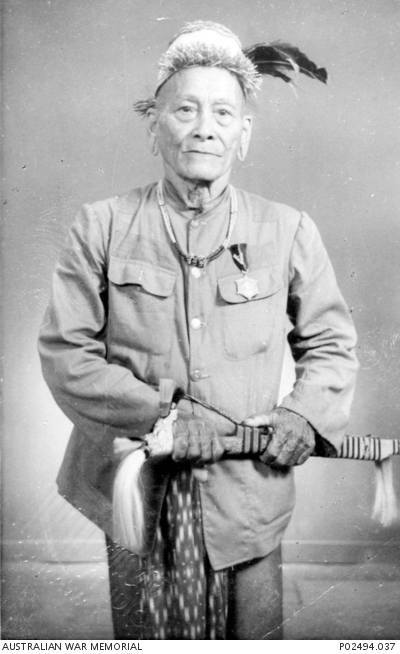
- Koh circa 1946

1st Paramount Chief of the Ibans
- In office 1924–1955
- Preceded by: Position established
- Succeeded by: Jugah anak Barieng

Personal details
- Born: 13 May 1870 Kalimantan, Dutch East Indies
- Died: 4 November 1956 (aged 86) Kapit, Hulu Rajang
- Children: Kenneth Kanyan

Koh anak Jubang MBE, commonly known as Temenggong Koh, (13 May 1870 – 4 November 1956) was an Iban tribal chief. During his lifetime, he was formally recognised as the first Paramount Chief of the Ibans with the title of Temenggong by the Sir Charles Vyner Brooke, the third Rajah of Sarawak.

== Early life ==
Koh was said to have been born in the Dutched-controlled territory of Borneo on 13 May 1870, the same day as a well-known local rebellion led by a local Kanowit chief named Lintong Moahari in Sibu. As an infant, his family moved to Song in the Sarawak Raj.

It is known that he became a penghulu or local chieftain of the Iban of the Rajang area before 1924.

== 1924 Kapit Peacemaking ==
On 16 November 1924, the Brooke government convened a peacemaking ceremony in Kapit, Sarawak, to resolve long-standing inter-tribal conflicts. The gathering brought together Iban leaders from the Rajang and Batang Ai areas, Orang Ulu chiefs from Balui and Apo Kayan, alongside British and Dutch colonial officials.

The ceremony was partly facilitated by Koh as the local chieftain of the Rajang Iban with the resulting agreement formally ending the practice of headhunting and established a framework for inter-tribal negotiation, trade, and regional stability. Among those present at the event was Penghulu Melintang, grandfather to Malaysia Agreement signatory, Tun Jugah.

For his role in facilitating the peace talks, Charles Vyner Brooke formally recognised Koh as Paramount Chief of the Ibans with the title of Temenggong.

== Later life ==
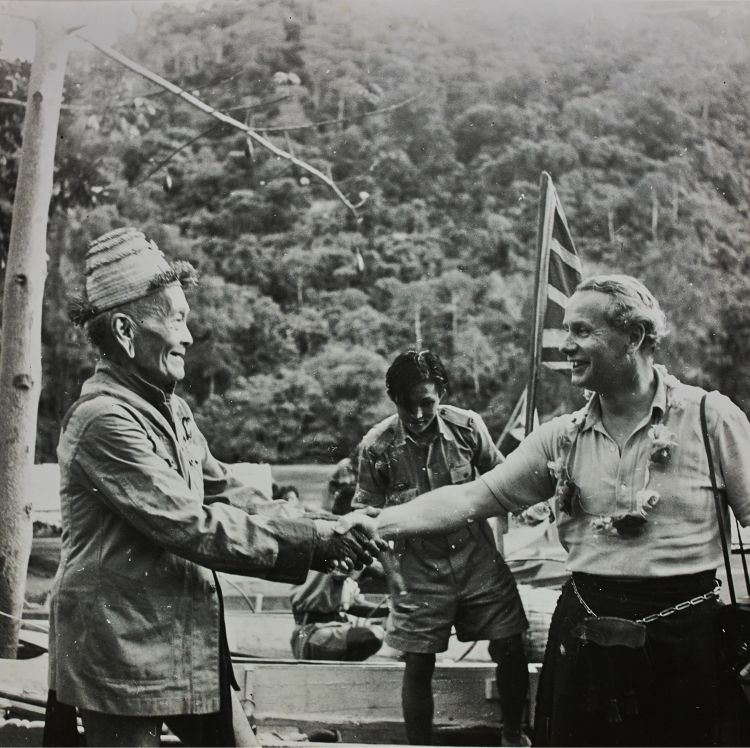
Koh greets High Commissioner MacDonald in 1952

During her visit to Sarawak in 1952, Marina, Duchess of Kent met Koh at the government residency of the Third Division in Sarikei.

In the same year, the Governor-General of Malaya Malcolm MacDonald visited Sarawak and met Koh and the two formed a close friendship.

Koh retired in 1955 as paramount chief but stayed active as a prominent and distinguished tribal leader. He was succeeded to the position of paramount chief by Temenggong Jugah.

== Death and legacy ==
Koh died on 4 November 1956 near Kapit, supposedly at the age of 86.

His son, Kenneth Kanyan, was born circa 1943. Kenneth was elected to the Council Negri from 1970 to 1974. Additionally he served in both state and federal positions, and eventually serving in the Dewan Negara between 1981 and 1987. He was also conferred his late father's title of Temenggong in 2003.

Daniel Jubang Kanyan, Koh's grandson, is involved in local politics and business, in addition to being a member of the Sarawak United Bumiputera Heritage Party (PBB).

== Honours ==
- Raj of Sarawak
  - Sarawak Government Long Service Decoration (1941)
- United Kingdom
  - Member of the Order of the British Empire (MBE) (1947)
  - Queen's Medal for Chiefs (1953)

== Bibliography ==
- Durham University. (n.d.). Beauty and diplomacy: The Malcolm MacDonald collections. https://stories.durham.ac.uk/macdonald/
- Garai, R., Mersat, N. I., Kedit, P. M., Noel, J. R., Gara, S. L., & Senang, B. M. (Eds.). (2025). Commemorating a century of Kapit peacemaking (1924–2024). Dayak Cultural Foundation.
- Ho, A. C. (Comp.). (1992). Sarawak historical events 1946–1960 (Enlarged ed.). See Hua Daily News Bhd.
- Kenneth Kanyan to be laid to rest tomorrow. (2016, March 3). The Borneo Post. https://www.theborneopost.com/2016/03/03/kenneth-kanyan-to-be-laid-to-rest-tomorrow/
- Media Chinese International Limited. (2012). Annual report 2011/12. https://www.mediachinesegroup.com/
- Sarawak Premier Department. (2025, May 18). PBB supreme council line-up for 2025–2028 term: Sarawak premier remains as PBB president. https://premierdept.sarawak.gov.my/web/subpage/news_view/18098/UKAS
- The Sarawak Gazette. (1956, December 31). 82(1186). https://www.pustaka-sarawak.com/gazette/gazette_uploaded/1485407157.pdf
