= Sajau Basap language =

Austronesian language spoken on Borneo

Sajau
- Sajau Basap, Sajau-Latti
- Native to: Indonesia
- Region: Borneo
- Native speakers: (6,000 cited 1981)
- Language family: Austronesian: Malayo-Polynesian; Greater North Borneo; Central Sarawak; Punan–Müller Schwaner; Punan; Sajau
- Dialects: Punan Sajau; Punan Basap; Punan Batu; Latti

Language codes
- ISO 639-3: sjb
- Glottolog: saja1241 Sajau-Latti lata1235 Latala

Sajau, Sajau Basap, or Sajau-Latti is an Austronesian language spoken by the Punan Sajau and Punan Basap people of Borneo in Indonesia.

The Punan Sajau preserve a song language known as Basa Latala.
