= Richard Ng (bishop) =

Malaysian prelate of the Catholic Church (born 1966)

His Excellency, The Most Reverend Richard Ng
- Bishop of Miri
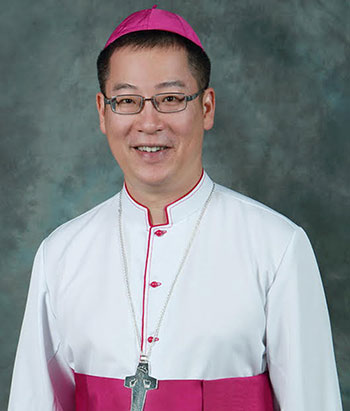
- Ng in 2013
- Diocese: Miri
- Appointed: 30 October 2013
- Installed: 25 January 2014
- Predecessor: Anthony Lee Kok Hin

Orders
- Ordination: 18 February 1995 by Peter Chung Hoan Ting
- Consecration: 25 January 2014 by Anthony Lee Kok Hin

Personal details
- Born: 20 June 1966 (age 59) Kuching, Sarawak, Malaysia
- Education: Pontifical Biblical Institute
- Motto: Proclaim the Gospel
- Coat of arms

Styles of Richard Ng
- Reference style: His Excellency; The Most Reverend
- Spoken style: Your Excellency
- Religious style: Bishop

Richard Ng (born 20 June 1966) is a Malaysian Catholic prelate who serves as the Bishop of Miri since 2014. He was a priest in the Archdiocese of Kuching prior to his appointment as bishop.

== Biography ==
Ng grew up in Kuching in a normal Catholic family. He received his primary education at Catholic English Primary School and secondary education at St Joseph’s Secondary School. After finishing Form 6 in 1985, he worked as a site supervisor for one year, and a few months in a laboratory. In 1987, he studied at St Peter’s College Seminary in Kuching. He was ordained a priest of the Archdiocese of Kuching in 1995. He was sent to study Sacred Scriptures at the Pontifical Biblical Institute, Rome in September 1999. He obtained a Licentiate in Sacred Scriptures in 2003.

When he return to Kuching, he was posted to teach Sacred Scriptures at St Peter’s College. He also serve as a full-time formator for seminarians. In 2008, he was appointed the rector of St Peter’s College.

On 30 October 2013, Pope Francis has accepted resignation of bishop Anthony Lee Kok Hin, who resign due to mandatory age, and appointed Ng as the successor. He received his episcopal consecration on 25 January 2014 from his predecessor, Bishop Anthony Lee Kok Hin, with Archbishop John Ha Tiong Hock and Bishop Joseph Hii Teck Kwong serving as co-consecrators. On the same day of his episcopal ordination, he took the canonical possession of the Diocese of Miri.
