= Bukitan people =

Bukitan
Beketan; Bakatan; Ketan; Manketa
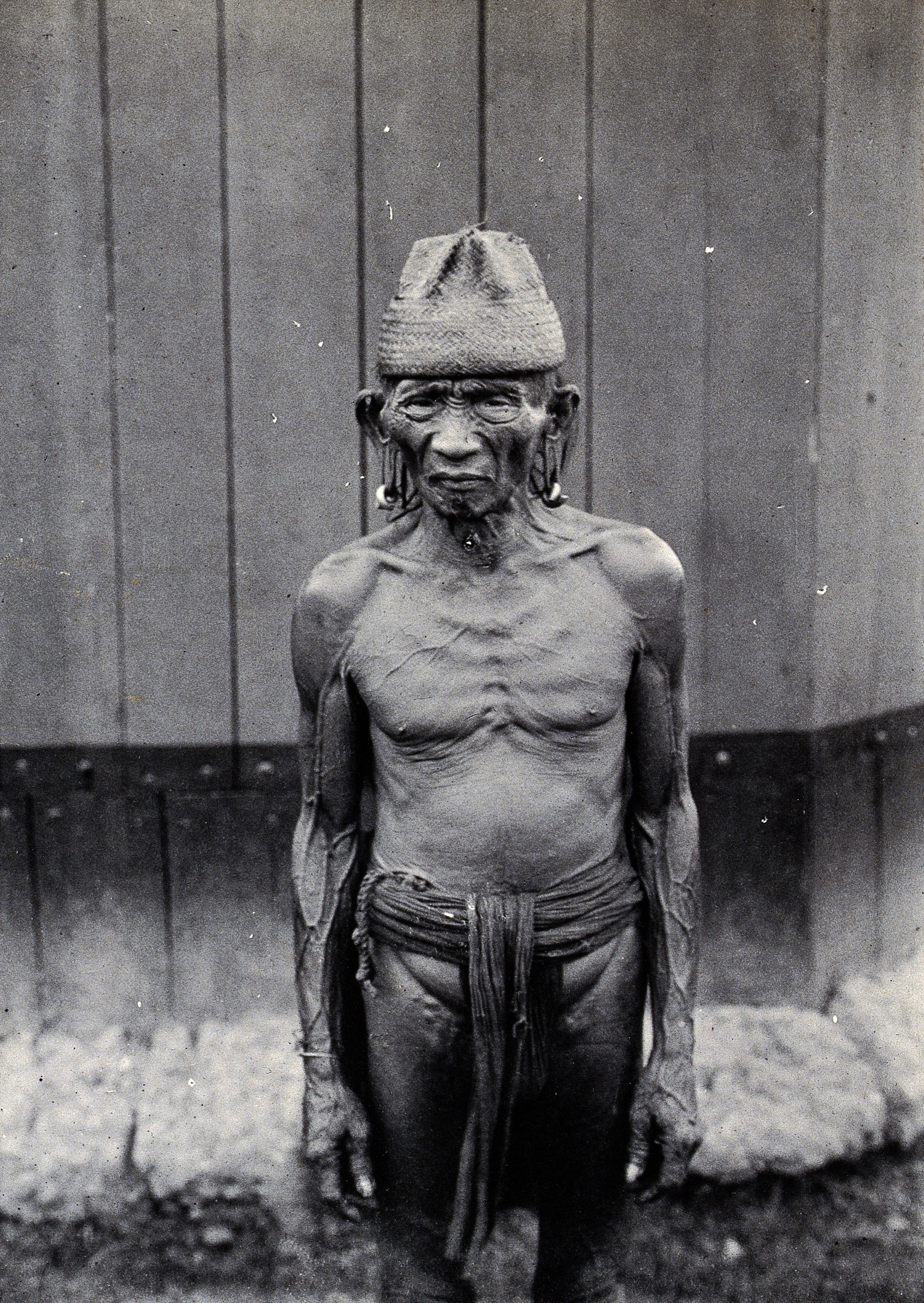
- A Bakatan(?) man in Sarawak

Regions with significant populations
- Indonesia
- Located in the administrative regions
- East Kalimantan: 570 (2000)
- West Kalimantan: 290 (2000)
- Sarawak: 289 (2000)

Languages
- Native: Bukitan languages; Standard Bukitan; Busang Bukitan; Ukit Bukitan; Also: Punan; Indonesian; Sarawak Malay; Malaysian English

Religion
- Christianity (predominantly), Animism

Related ethnic groups
- Ukit; Sian; Kejaman; Sekapan; Lahanan

Bukitan (also Baketan or Bakatan) are the indigenous people native to the Nanga Palin in Embaloh Hilir of Kapuas Hulu Regency, Indonesia. Nowadays, the Bukitan diaspora can be found in the neighbouring Nanga Palin as well; including the district of Bintulu in Sarawak.

== History ==
=== Origin ===
The origin of the Bukitan is from the Nanga Palin in Embaloh Hilir of Kapuas Hulu Regency in West Kalimantan. Due to the tribal conflict with its neighbouring tribe (Iban people), some of Bukitans have to migrate out of their homeland. However, significant population of Bukitan people can still be found in their ancestral territory.

=== Diaspora ===
Some of the Bukitan fled to Saribas which is what is now in the Betong Division. There, they settled and built their community. During those years, they co-existed with another diaspora of Ibans there, after a peace sealed by the marriage of the daughter of their leader Entinggi to the son of the Iban chief Tindin. Some of them also moved into Sarawak via Lubok Antu and settled there in the 19th century.

After many years, due to some misunderstandings, war broke out with the Ibans and they lost. They again fled to various places before settling in Merit River, a tributary of Batang Tatau river in Bintulu division and its vicinity until today.

Evidence of Bukitan existence can be found in areas such as the Saribas (Paku, Layar and Rimbas) and Lubok Antu in the form of burial grounds, name of places and ancient orchards.

== Notable people ==
- Jonathan Tinggang Ngabang, a high jumper Malaysian athlete.
