= Tajang Laing =

Malaysian politician (1926–2026)

Dewan Undangan Negeri Sarawak
- In office 1979–1983
- Preceded by: Nyipa Bato
- Succeeded by: Nyipa Bato

Personal details
- Born: February 14, 1926 Long Linau, Belaga, Sarawak, Malaysia
- Died: April 23, 2026 (aged 100) Kuching, Sarawak, Malaysia
- Spouse: Devong Anyie
- Occupation: Ahli Politik

Tajang Laing (February 14, 1926 – April 23, 2026) was a Malaysian Orang Ulu politician.

== Life and career ==
Tajang Laing was the first teacher of the Kayan nation after receiving a diploma at the Batu Lintang Campus Teacher Education Institute. He had taught at SK Abun Matu before developing a school, namely SK Long Linau in 1953.

He played an important role in representing the Orang Ulu community as a special representative in the Cobbold Commission in 1962 and also served as a member of the Regional Council and the Kapit State Invitational Council in 1965.

From 1963 to 1970, he served as the Minister of State and held the position of Minister of State Affairs from 1963 to 1966, Minister of Agriculture, and Minister of Forestry until 1970.

Laing died on April 23, 2026, at the age of 100.
