= Anthony Lee Kok Hin =

Malaysian Roman Catholic prelate (born 1935)

His Excellency, The Most Reverend Anthony Lee Kok Hin
- Bishop Emeritus of Miri
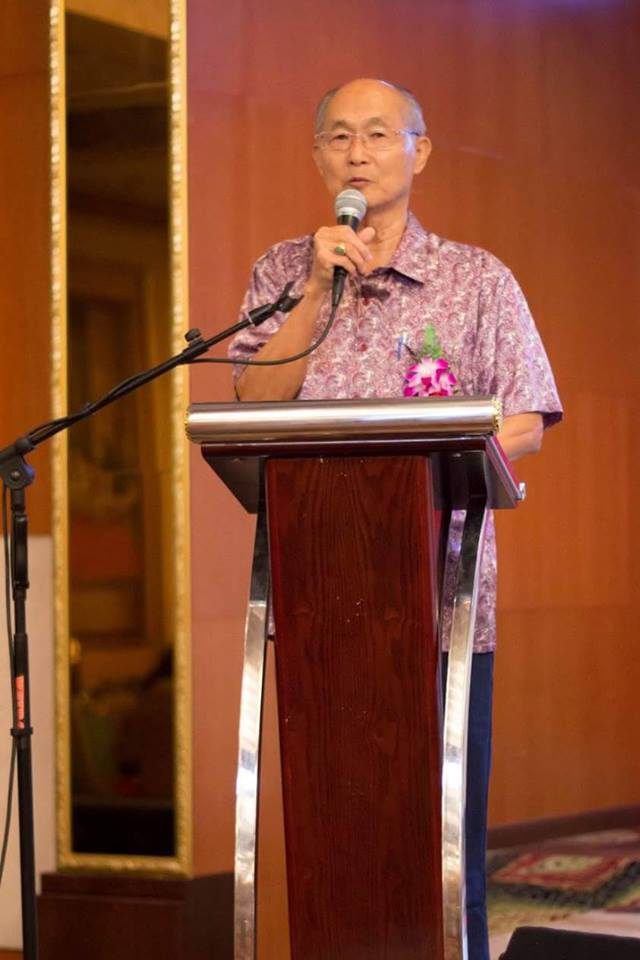
- Lee in 2016
- Church: Roman Catholic Church
- Diocese: Miri
- Appointed: 30 May 1977
- Installed: 20 November 1977
- Term ended: 30 October 2013
- Predecessor: Anthony Denis Galvin
- Successor: Richard Ng

Orders
- Ordination: 2 January 1966 by Anthony Denis Galvin
- Consecration: 20 November 1977 by Peter Chung Hoan Ting

Personal details
- Born: 20 March 1935 (age 91) Miri, Sarawak
- Motto: Non recuso laborem (English: I cannot refuse the task)

Anthony Lee Kok Hin (born 20 March 1937) is a Malaysian Roman Catholic prelate.

Ordained to the priesthood in 1966, Lee was named bishop of the Roman Catholic Diocese of Miri, Malaysia on 30 May 1977 and retired on 30 October 2013.

He was succeeded by Bishop Richard Ng.
