= Bah-Biau Punan language =

Austronesian language spoken on Borneo

Punan
- Bah-Biau
- Native to: Indonesia, Malaysia, Brunei
- Region: Borneo
- Ethnicity: Punan Bah
- Native speakers: 6,000 (2020)
- Language family: Austronesian: Malayo-Polynesian; Greater North Borneo; Central Sarawak; Punan–Müller-Schwaner; Punan; Punan

Language codes
- ISO 639-3: pna
- Glottolog: puna1275

Bah-Biau Punan is an Austronesian language spoken by the Punan Bah and Punan Biau people of Borneo in Indonesia, Malaysia and Brunei.
