= Aput language =

Austronesian language spoken in Indonesia

Aput
- Punan Aput
- Native to: Indonesia
- Region: West Kalimantan
- Ethnicity: Penan people
- Native speakers: (370 cited 1981)
- Language family: Austronesian: Malayo-Polynesian; Greater North Borneo; Central Sarawak; Punan–Müller-Schwaner; Punan; Aput

Language codes
- ISO 639-3: pud
- Glottolog: puna1267

Punan Aput, or Aput, is a Punan language of East Kalimantan, Indonesia, one of several spoken by the Punan people.
