= Tembawai Tampun Juah =

Customary forest in West Kalimantan, Indonesia

Tembawai Tampun Juah or Tembawang Tampun Juah is a customary forest which is located in the Segumon region of Sanggau, West Kalimantan, Indonesia. It is also believed to be an early settlement of the ancestor of Iban people and Bidayuh people according to their legends.

== Background ==
According to Iban oral traditions, Tembawai Tampun Juah is considered the first settlement of the Iban people, symbolising their journey after being separated from their ancestral figures.

The name Tampun Juah originates from a traditional story concerning a man named Juah and his cousin, Lemay, who were married to each other. In Iban customary law, marriage between close relatives was considered a serious violation of societal norms. According to the story, those found guilty of such an offence were subjected to capital punishment by stoning with bamboo. Their bodies were subsequently washed in a river as a ritual intended to cleanse the ancestors of sin and avert misfortune. The term Tampun Juah is therefore associated with the punishment imposed on Juah, with Tampun referring to the customary law or punishment and Juah referring to the individual involved.

== Present day ==
Nowadays, Tembawang Tampun Juah is now acknowledged as a customary forest and a significant cultural heritage site for the Dayak communities of Borneo. Traditional rites, cultural events, and the preservation of ancestral legacy are still held in the area. The inauguration of the Tembawang Tampuh Juah Customary Forest was held by President of Indonesia, Joko Widodo on September 20, 2018, in Jakarta, along with 15 other representatives of indigenous communities from all over Indonesia.

Its official recognition as a customary forest in 2018 marked an important step towards safeguarding indigenous land rights and promoting sustainable forest management. However, the area continues to face environmental pressures arising from agricultural expansion and changes in traditional land-use practices.
