= Kuala Tatau =

- Village
- Location in East Malaysia Location in Malaysia
- Coordinates: 3°04′43″N 112°48′15″E
- Country: Malaysia
- State: Sarawak
- Division: Bintulu
- District: Tatau

Kuala Tatau is a village in Tatau District, Bintulu Division in the Malaysian state of Sarawak. It is located at the mouth of Tatau River with the South China Sea, about 30 kilometres (19 miles) downstream to the north of the district town Tatau, as well as about 50 kilometres (31 miles) south-west of the city Bintulu.

== Transport ==
=== Local bus ===
Route No.	Operating Route	Operator
B8	Jambatan Kuala Tatau	CPL

=== Bus Express ===
Operating Route	Operator
Bintulu-Mukah, Dalat	Eva Express
