= Punan languages =

Group of isolects spoken by the Punan people of Borneo

Punan
- Geographic distribution: Indonesia and Malaysia (Borneo)
- Linguistic classification: Austronesian: Malayo-Polynesian; Greater North Borneo; Central Sarawak; Punan–Müller-Schwaner; Punan

Language codes
- Glottolog: puna1280

The Punan languages or Rejang-Sajau languages are a group of mutually intelligible isolects spoken by the Punan and related peoples of Borneo in Indonesia and Malaysia.

== Classification ==
Smith (2017) classifies Punan dialects as follows:

- Sru (Seru) †
- Punan Tubu-Bah
  - Punan Tubu, Punan Bah, Sajau, Latti
- Punan
  - Beketan (Bukitan), Punan Lisum, Punan Aput, Ukit, Buket (Bukat)

== Austroasiatic influence ==
Kaufman (2018) notes that some Proto-Punan words (Smith 2017) are of likely Austroasiatic origin, including the following.

- *-iap ‘count’
- *hen ‘3.sg pronoun’
- *buhak ‘white’
- *obet ‘animal trap (general)’
