= Bukitan language =

Punan language of Malaysia

Bukitan
- Native to: Indonesia, Malaysia
- Region: West Kalimantan, Sarawak
- Ethnicity: Bukitan
- Native speakers: (860 cited 2000)
- Language family: Austronesian: Malayo-Polynesian; North Bornean; Central Sarawak; Punan–Müller-Schwaner; Bukitan
- Dialects: Punan Ukit; Punan Busang

Language codes
- ISO 639-3: bkn
- Glottolog: buki1248

Bukitan is a Punan language of West Kalimantan, Indonesia.
