= French frigate Alceste =

Alceste has been the name two ships in the French Navy:

- French frigate Alceste (1780), launched in 1780 and captured by the Royal Navy in 1799
- French frigate Alceste (1846), launched in 1846 and broken up in 1891
