= HMS Alceste =

Two ships of the Royal Navy have borne the name HMS Alceste, after Alcestis, a character in Greek mythology:

- HMS Alceste (1793) was a 32-gun fifth rate captured from the French in 1793. The British transferred her to the Sardinians that year, but the French recaptured her in 1794. The British recaptured her in 1799 and sold her for breaking up in 1802.
- HMS Alceste (1806) was a 38-gun fifth rate, previously the French ship Minerve. She was captured in 1806 and was wrecked in 1817.
