= Orang Ulu =

Group of Dayak peoples of Sarawak

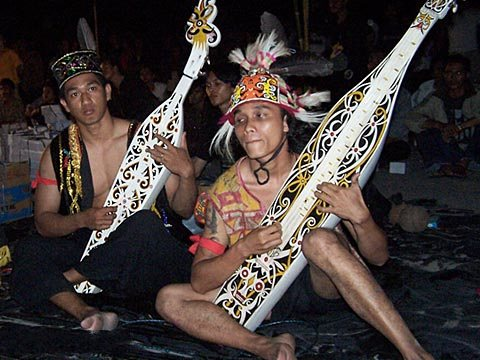
Two Dayak Orang Ulu men from Sarawak, Malaysia, playing the sapeh.

Orang Ulu ("people of the interior" in Malay) is an ethnic designation politically coined to group together roughly 27 very small but ethnically diverse tribal groups in northeastern Sarawak, Malaysia with populations ranging from less than 300 people to over 25,000 people. Orang Ulu is not a legal term, and no such racial group exists or is listed in the Malaysian Constitution. The term was popularised by the Orang Ulu National Association (OUNA), which was formed in 1969. Orang Ulu is totalling 180 000 people which is 6.2% from 2.8 millions of Sarawak people.

The Orang Ulu tribal groups are diverse; they typically live in longhouses elaborately decorated with murals and woodcarvings. They are also well known for their intricate beadwork detailed tattoos, rattan weaving, and other tribal crafts. The Orang Ulu tribes can also be identified by their unique music - distinctive sounds from their sapes, a plucked boat-shaped lute, formerly with two strings, nowadays usually with four strings. They also practice Kanjet, a form of traditional dance.

A vast majority of the Orang Ulu tribes are Christians with significant Muslim minorities (especially among converts to the faith via intermarriages to ethnicities such as Malays and Melanaus who are adherents of the said belief), but old traditional religions are still practised in some areas.

== Orang Ulu classification ==
There are about 27 small indigenous groups that are classified as Orang Ulu such as:-

- Apo Kayan people
  - Kenyah people
    - Sebop
  - Kayan people (Borneo)
    - Bahau people
  - Kendayan
  - Ukit people
    - Penan
- Kajang
  - Kajaman
  - Lahanan
  - Sihan
  - Bukitan people
  - Punan
    - Uheng Kereho
    - Hovongan
    - Lisum
- Apo Duat
  - Kelabit people
  - Berawan
  - Kiput
  - Lun Bawang
  - Sa'ban people

== Notable people ==
- Baru Bian - Former Malaysian minister.
- Jacob Dungau Sagan - Former assistant Malaysian minister.
- Idris Jala - Former Malaysian Senate and Malaysia Minister.
- Henry Sum Agong - Former assistant Malaysian minister.
- Liwan Lagang - Sarawak minister.
- Tajang Laing - first Kayan Teacher and First orang Ulu Minister in Sarawak, 1970s
- Mutang Tagal - the former President of the Dewan Negara

== See also ==
- Sarawak
- Penan
- Apo Kayan
