= Saribas =

Saribas is an area of Sarawak, now in the Betong Division of Malaysia, on the island of Borneo. The area has a long history, and is defined by the three main rivers in the region, the Batang Rayar, Batang Paku, and Batang Rimbas. Saribas is famous for its Iban longhouses and is regarded as a centre of Iban culture. It was annexed to Sarawak by James Brooke in 1849.

== History ==
The coastal regions of Sarawak came under the influence of the Bruneian Empire in the 16th century. A Dutch report in 1609 mentioned a rebellion against the Bruneian sultanate by the tribes living in Calca, Saribas, and Melano to politically align themselves with the Johor Sultanate.

The Saribas Malays kingdom was one of the five early Malays kingdoms in the Sarawak, located at the confluence of Saribas and Rimbas rivers located in Debak. It was established in the early or mid 17th century. Saribas kingdom is mentioned in the manuscript Silsilah Raja-Raja Brunei (Genealogical History of the Sultans of Brunei). In the Syair Tarsilah Cetera Abang Gudam dan Temenggong Qadir Negeri Saribas, a Bruneian dignitary fled the capital because his daughter had been taken by the Sultan of Brunei. He set up a new capital in Saribas and sent Dato' Gundam (Minangkabau Prince) to retrieve his daughter, who married her and became the ruler of Saribas kingdom. The administration was passed on to Datu Patinggi, Datu Bandar, Aulaksamana, Datuk Imam and Datu Hakim ( the minangs) after Temenggong Kadir Passed and ended the Brunei influenced there. The Beginning of Minangkabau's Rulers

Iban people began to migrate to Saribas from Kapuas Hulu from the 1750s onwards. Within five generations, they had established communities in Batang Lupar, Batang Sadong, Batang Layar, and Saribas. In 1839, James Brooke, a British explorer, first arrived in Sarawak. He established the Raj of Sarawak on territory handed over to him by the Sultan of Brunei, which did not initially include Saribas. It was governed by the Brooke family (the White Rajas) between 1841 and 1946. In 1843, Brooke's forces attacked the Iban at Padeh, Paku, and Rimbas in the Batang Saribas region. Brooke gained victory over the Sekrang and Saribas Iban at the Battle of Beting Maru on 31 July 1849. The Sultan of Brunei then ceded the Saribas and Skrang districts to Brooke in 1853, which later became the Second Division.

During World War II, Sarawak was occupied by the Japanese for three years. After the war, the last White Rajah, Charles Vyner Brooke, ceded Sarawak to Britain, and in 1946 it became a British Crown Colony. On 22 July 1963, Sarawak was granted self-government by the British, and it became one of the founding members of the Federation of Malaysia on 16 September 1963.
