= Tatau =

Tatau Pekan Tatau
- Town and district capital
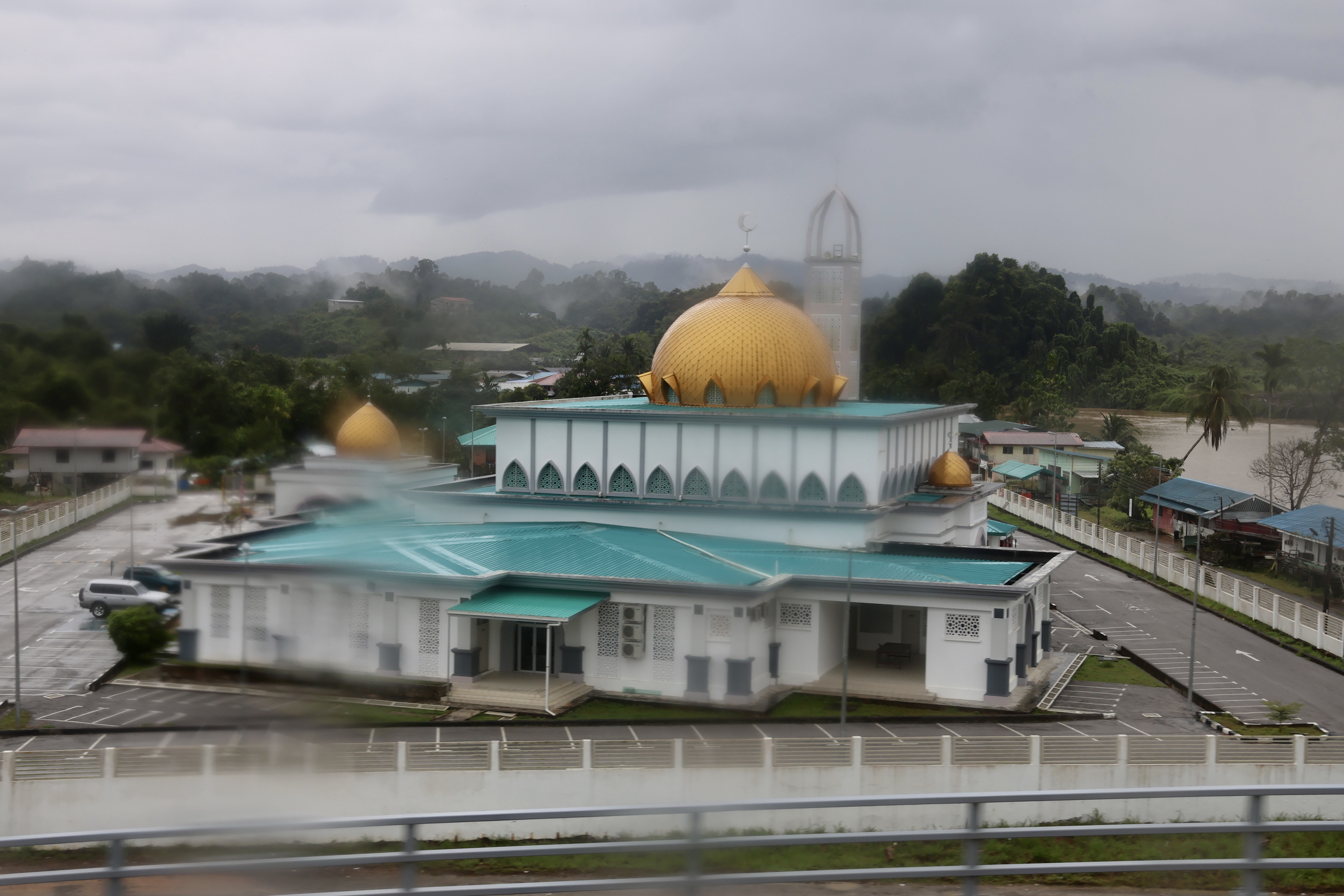
- Daerah Tatau Mosque

- Location within Borneo
- Coordinates: 2°53′0″N 112°51′0″E
- Country: Malaysia
- State: Sarawak
- Division: Bintulu
- District: Tatau

Area
  - Total: 4,946 km^{2} (1,910 sq mi)

Population (2020)
  - Total: 31,920
  - Density: 6.454/km^{2} (16.72/sq mi)

Tatau is a town, and the capital of the Tatau District in Bintulu Division, Sarawak, Malaysia. The district's reported total population for Tatau was 31,920 in 2020. Tatau became a district in 1987. Before that it was a sub district under Bintulu District. The main spoken languages are Iban, Kenyah, Beketan and Punan.

== Education ==
=== Secondary school ===
- SMK Tatau

=== Primary school ===
- SK Tatau
- SJK(C) Chung Hua Tatau
- SK Ulu Kakus
- SK Tatau
- SK Sungai Bagiau
- SK Sangan Iban
- SK Rumah Keseng
- SK Rh Tayai
- SK Ng Tau
- SK Ng Penyarai
- SK Kuala Tatau
- SK Kuala Serupai
- SK Kuala Annau
- SK Kelawit
- SK Nanga Tau
- SK Nanga Muput
- SK Rumah Barrau

== Pan Borneo Highway project ==
As the part of the Pan Borneo Highway, Tatau is part of a works package contract (WPC09) from Sg. Arip Bridge to Bintulu Airport Junction. The main proposal is upgrading the existing road from two way lane to four way two lane and constructing a new parallel bridges alongside of the project, including the main Batang Tatau Bridge. It was taken by the turnkey contractor, Lebuhraya Borneo Utara Sdn Bhd and the main contractor of this WPC is KKBWCT Joint Venture Sdn Bhd.

== Government ==
The entire Tatau district was governed by Bintulu Development Authority meanwhile its sub-district, Kuala Tatau, which links it to Balingian in Mukah district, are under the administration of Dalat and Mukah District Council.

== Transport ==
=== Local bus ===
Route No.	Operating Route	Operator	Remark
B9	Bintulu-Tatau	CPL	

== Climate ==
Tatau has a tropical rainforest climate (Af) with heavy to very heavy rainfall year-round.

Climate data for Tatau
Month	Jan	Feb	Mar	Apr	May	Jun	Jul	Aug	Sep	Oct	Nov	Dec	Year
Mean daily maximum °C (°F)	29.7 (85.5)	29.7 (85.5)	30.4 (86.7)	31.0 (87.8)	31.4 (88.5)	31.2 (88.2)	31.2 (88.2)	31.0 (87.8)	31.0 (87.8)	30.7 (87.3)	30.5 (86.9)	30.1 (86.2)	30.7 (87.2)
Daily mean °C (°F)	26.1 (79.0)	26.1 (79.0)	26.6 (79.9)	26.9 (80.4)	27.3 (81.1)	26.9 (80.4)	26.8 (80.2)	26.7 (80.1)	26.8 (80.2)	26.7 (80.1)	26.6 (79.9)	26.2 (79.2)	26.6 (80.0)
Mean daily minimum °C (°F)	22.5 (72.5)	22.5 (72.5)	22.8 (73.0)	22.9 (73.2)	23.2 (73.8)	22.7 (72.9)	22.4 (72.3)	22.4 (72.3)	22.6 (72.7)	22.7 (72.9)	22.7 (72.9)	22.4 (72.3)	22.6 (72.8)
Average rainfall mm (inches)	415 (16.3)	327 (12.9)	310 (12.2)	256 (10.1)	243 (9.6)	257 (10.1)	218 (8.6)	280 (11.0)	310 (12.2)	355 (14.0)	365 (14.4)	460 (18.1)	3,796 (149.5)
Source: Climate-Data.org
