= Bahau people =

Sub-ethnic group

Bahau people Dayak Bahau
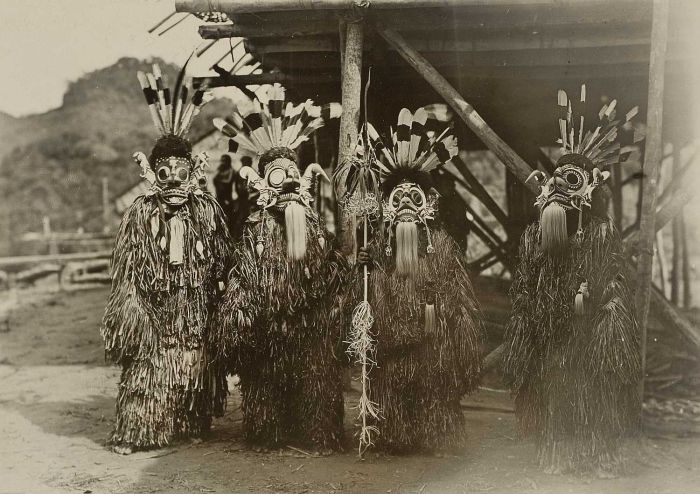
- Dancers wearing Hudoq performing a mask dance during the sowing celebration of the Bahau Dayak, Upper Mahakam, circa 1898-1900.

Total population
- 22,000

Regions with significant populations
- Indonesia (East Kalimantan)

Languages
- Bahau language, Indonesian language

Religion
- Bungan (Folk religion), Christianity

Related ethnic groups
- Kayan people (Borneo), Kenyah people

Bahau or Kayan Mekam people is a sub-ethnic group of the Apo Kayan people who inhabit West Kutai Regency (9.3%), East Kalimantan, Indonesia.

They are found in regional districts of :-

- Long Iram district, West Kutai Regency
- Long Bagun district, Mahakam Ulu Regency
- Long Pahangai, Mahakam Ulu Regency

== Language ==
The Bahau language is part of the Kayan-Murik languages.

- Kayan-Murik languages (17 languages)
  - Kayan language:
    - Bahau language, Bahau people of the Mahakam Ulu Regency, East Kalimantan, Indonesia
    - Busang Kayan language, Busang Kayan people of the West Kutai Regency, East Kalimantan, Indonesia
    - Wahau Kayan language, Wahau Kayan people of the Wahau river mouth, East Kutai Regency, East Kalimantan, Indonesia
    - Mahakam Kayan language, Mahakam Kayan people of the West Kutai Regency, East Kalimantan, Indonesia
    - Kayan River Kayan language, Kayan River Kayan people of the Malinau Regency, East Kalimantan, Indonesia
    - Baram Kayan language, Baram Kayan people of Sarawak, Malaysia
    - Rejang Kayan language, Rejang Kayan people of Sarawak, Malaysia
    - Mendalam Kayan language, Mendalam Kayan people of the Kapuas Hulu Regency, West Kalimantan, Indonesia
  - Modang language:
    - Modang language, Modang people of the West Kutai Regency, East Kalimantan, Indonesia
    - Segai language, Berau Regency, East Kalimantan, Indonesia
  - Punan Muller-Schwaner:
    - Aoheng language, Aoheng or Penihing people of the West Kutai Regency, East Kalimantan, Indonesia
    - Punan Aput language, East Kalimantan, Indonesia
    - Punan Merah language, East Kalimantan, Indonesia
    - Uheng-Kereho language, Uheng-Kereho people of the Kapuas Hulu Regency, West Kalimantan, Indonesia
    - Bukat language, Bukat people of the West Kutai Regency, East Kalimantan, Indonesia
    - Hovongan language, Hovongan people of the Kapuas Hulu Regency, West Kalimantan, Indonesia
  - Murik language:
    - Murik Kayan language, Murik people of Sarawak, Malaysia

== Culture ==
=== Folk Song ===
- Panau-Panau

=== Dance ===
- Hudoq dance
