= Krio =

Krio may refer to:

- Sierra Leone Creole people, also known as Krio people
- Krio language, language of the Sierra Leone Krio people
- Krio Dayak people, an ethnic group in West Kalimantan, Indonesia
- Krio Dayak language
- Keriau River, in West Kalimantan, Indonesia
- Cape Krio, place of ancient Cnidos (modern Tekir), Turkey

== See also ==
- Krios (disambiguation)
- Creole (disambiguation)
- Cape Verdean Creole
- Criollo (disambiguation)
- Keriu
- Kriyoro (Suriname)
- Kreyol (disambiguation)
- Kreol (disambiguation)
- Kriol (disambiguation)
- Kriolu
