= Krio Dayak =

Krio Dayak may refer to:

- the Krio Dayak people
- the Krio Dayak language
