= Apo Kayan people =

Ethnic group of Borneo

Apo Kayan people Apokayan / Apu Kayan / Apau Kayan
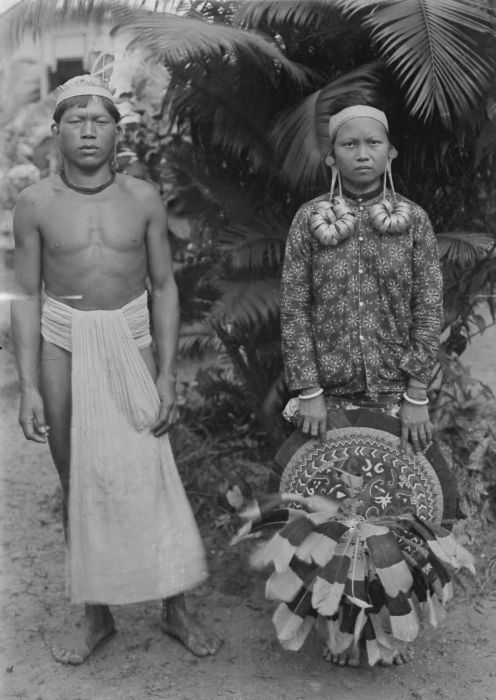
- An Apo Kayan Dayak man and woman.

Regions with significant populations
- Borneo: Indonesia (East Kalimantan and North Kalimantan); Malaysia (Sarawak)

Languages
- Kayan–Murik languages, Kenyah languages, Indonesian language, Malaysian language (Sarawak Malay)

Religion
- Christianity (predominantly), Bungan, Islam

Related ethnic groups
- Orang Ulu (Kenyah people, Kayan people (Borneo)), Kayan Mekam or Kayan Bahau people

The Apo Kayan people are one of the Dayak people groups that are spread throughout Sarawak of Malaysia, North Kalimantan and East Kalimantan of Indonesia. The earliest Apo Kayan people are from the riverside of the Kayan River, Bulungan Regency, North Kalimantan, Indonesia. According to the Apo Kayan Dayak legend, the Kayan people are the forefathers of which all smaller sub-ethnic Dayak people that are found along the Kayan River came from. Today, the population of the Apo Kayan people are estimated about 64,900.

== Sub-ethnic ==
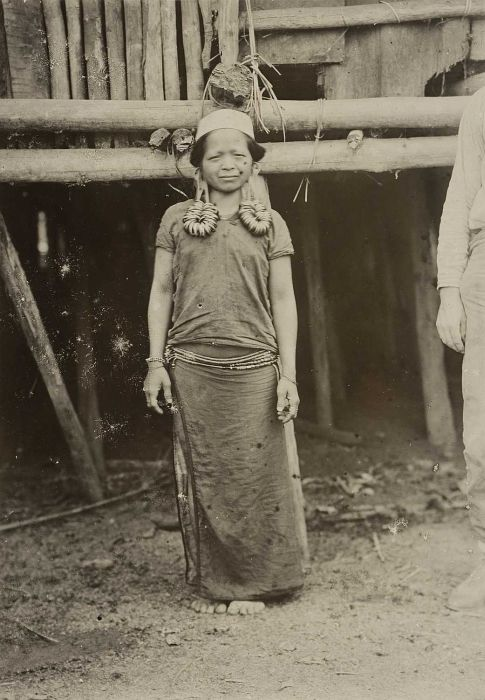
A photo of a Dayak Kenyah woman from the Apo Kayan region (upper Bulungan Regency), central Borneo (now North Kalimantan), Indonesia taken by Anton Willem Nieuwenhuis during the Commission's Trip to central Borneo, circa 1898–1900. Photo of Jean Demmeni.

The Apo Kayan people group are divided into 3 sub-ethic Dayak people, namely:-

- Kayan people (Borneo)
- Kenyah people
- Bahau people

From the 3 sub-ethnic Dayak people group, they are further divided into 60 smaller sub-ethnic groups that are spread across 60 settlements that are located in Kalimantan and making them the smallest of the sub-ethnic group (Sedatuk) that still retain their family genealogy.

=== Kenyah people ===
The Kenyah Dayak people comprises 24 smaller sub-ethnics:-

- Kenyah
- Kenyah Bauh
- Lepo Payah
- Uma Klap
- Nyibun Saban
- Lepo Maut
- Ma Long
- Ma Alim
- Lepo Ko
- Ma Badang
- Ulun Nerau
- Ulun
- Lepo Tau
- Lepo Jalan
- Lepo Bam
- Lepo Tukung
- Lepo Aga
- Lepo Bakung
- Baka
- Lepo Lepo
- Lepo Lisan
- Lepo Kayan
- Ngure / Urik
- Lepo Kulit

=== Kayan people ===
The Kayan Dayak people are divided into 10 smaller sub-ethnics:-

- Uma Pliau
- Uma Puh
- Uma Samuka
- Uma Naving
- Uma Lasung
- Uma Daru
- Uma Paku
- Uma Bawang
- Uma Juman
- Uma Leken

=== Bahau people ===
The Bahau Dayak people are made of 26 smaller sub-ethnics:-

- Saputan
- Pnihing
- Kayan
- Long Glat
- Ma Suling
- Long Mai
- Uma Lohat
- Hwang Ana
- Hwang Tring
- Segai
- Modang
- Melarang
- Ma Belur
- Ma Lowang
- Ma Aging
- Na Pagung
- Ma Bau / Uban
- Uvan Dali
- Bahau
- Uwabg Hurai
- Uvang Mekan
- Uvang Boh
- Uvang Sirap
- Uma Mehak
- Uma Teliba
- Tunjung Linggal

== Geographical location ==
Geographically, the meaning of Apo Kayan can be understood as plateau that is located at the North Kalimantan-Sarawak boundary. Including Kayan Hulu district, Malinau Regency, North Kalimantan, Indonesia, this region has a height between 450 and 1,700 meters above sea levels.

== Culture ==
The uniqueness of the Apo Kayan Dayak community is their wearing of earrings and tattoos on the hands and feet of both men and women. According to the ancestral beliefs, the wearing of earrings separates men from animals. While the tattoos signifies the difference in social rankings. According to them, the more tattoo markings are found on the body meant the higher the social status in the society would be. However, today the tradition of wearing earrings and tattoos are slowly being left out by the younger generation of the Apo Kayan people. This is due to the feeling of embarrassment to uphold such practices in today's modern society.
