= Kreol =

The name Kreol may be

- any of many creole peoples or creole languages
  - Haitian Creole, also known as Kreol Ayisyen
  - Mauritian Creole, also known as Kreol Morisien
  - Seychelles Creole, also known as Kreol Seselwa
- Kreol (software), a software MIDI instrument

== See also ==
- Creole peoples
- Creole language
- Criol
- Criollo (disambiguation)
- Krio (disambiguation)
- Kriol (disambiguation)
- Kreyol (disambiguation)
- Kriolu
