= Dayak people =

Austronesian ethnic group of Borneo

Dayak people Dayaks
Dyak Dayuh
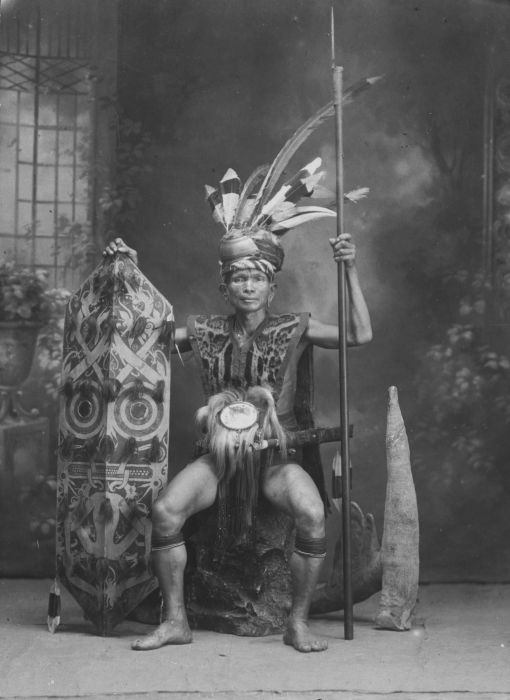
- Dayak chief as seen holding a spear and a Klebit Bok shield.

Total population
- c. 4.21 million

Regions with significant populations
- Borneo
- Indonesia: 2,185,904
- Malaysia: 1,986,815
- Brunei: 38,540

Languages
- Indigenous; Greater North Borneo (Malayic, Land Dayak, Kayan-Murik, Central Sarawak, North Sarawak, Sabahan) • Barito • Tamanic; Also; Indonesian • Malaysian

Religion
- Predominantly; Christianity (Protestantism, Catholicism) (62.7%); Minorities; Islam (Sunni) (31.6%); Kaharingan (4.8%) and Others (i.e. Animism) (0.9%)

Related ethnic groups
- Austronesian peoples; Banjarese; Bisaya; Bornean Malays; Kadazan; Dusun; Murut; Paitan; Rungus; Minahasa; Sama-Bajau; Malagasy, etc.

The Dayak (/ˈdaɪ.ək/; older spelling: Dajak), Dyak or Dayuh are the Austronesian ethnic groups native of Borneo. It is a loose term for over 200 ethnic groups located principally in the central and southern interior of Borneo, often in highlands or near rivers, and each with its own dialect, customs, laws, territory, and culture, although common distinguishing traits are readily identifiable. The Dayak were traditionally animist in beliefs (Kaharingan and Folk Hindus), but since the 19th century there has been mass conversion to Christianity or Islam.

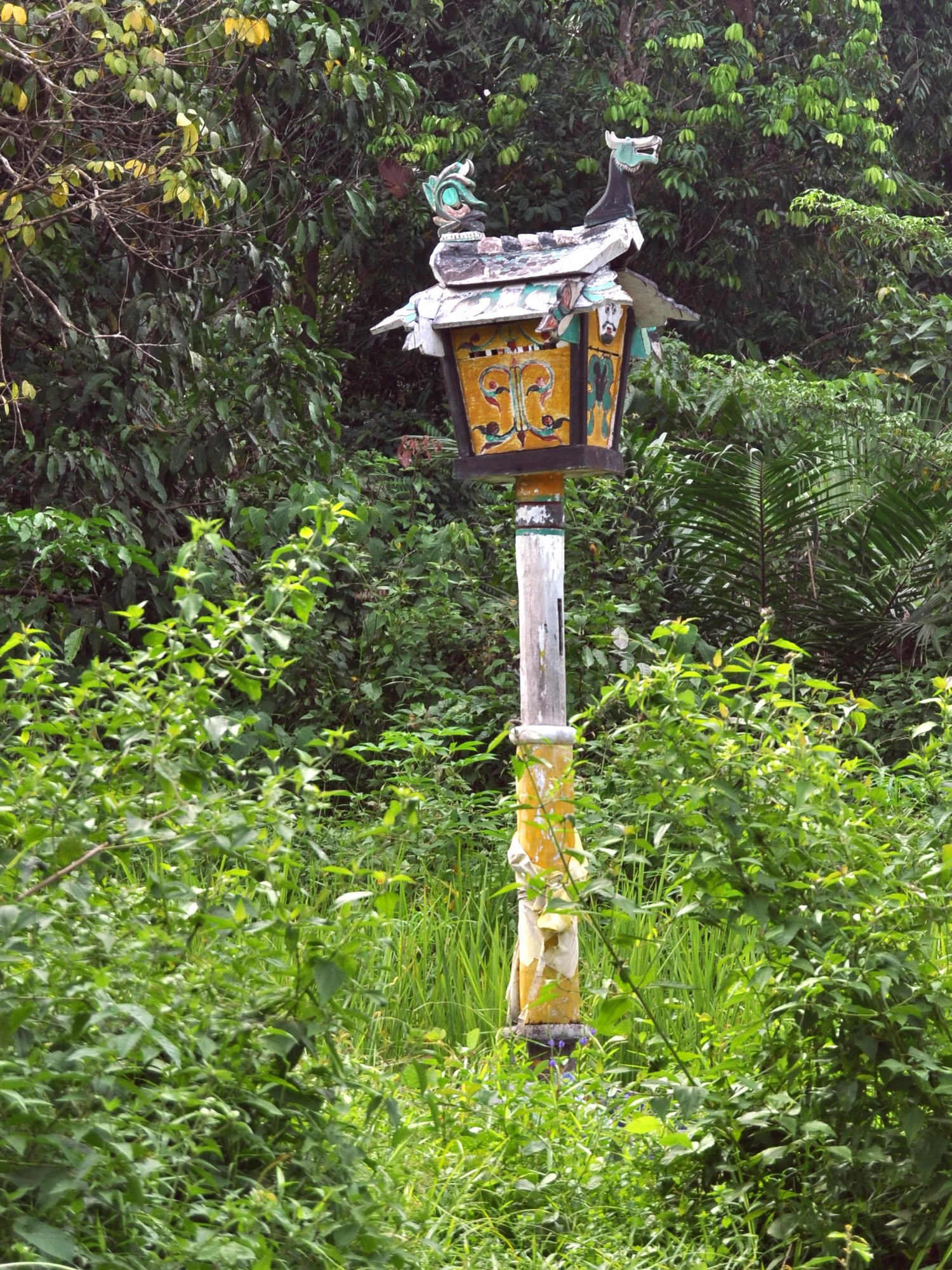
A sandung, housing the remains of a Pesaguan Dayak after Tiwah ceremony which is a part of Kaharingan religion rituals.

== Etymology ==
It is commonly assumed that the name originates from the Bruneian and Melanau word for "interior people", without any reference to an exact ethnic group. Particularly, it derives from a related Kenyah word for "upstream" (compare with ethnonym Lun Dayeh). The term was adopted by Dutch and German authors as an umbrella term for any non-Muslim natives of Borneo. Thus, historically, the difference between Dayak and non-Dayak natives could be understood as a religious distinction. English writers disapproved of the classification made by the Dutch and Germans, with James Brooke preferring to use the term Dayak for only two distinct groups, the Land (Bidayuh) and Sea Dayaks (Iban).

The Dutch classification from the 19th century has since continued in Indonesia as a catch-all term for indigenous, often non-Muslim tribes on the island until today. The term gained traction in the early 1900s among rising middle class and intellectual figures (such as Hausman Baboe) from those tribes and being used as a unifying term for Dayaks in Kalimantan. In Malaysia, the term Dayak generally reserves as an almost exclusively reference to the natives of Sarawak, namely Iban (previously referred as Sea Dayaks) and Bidayuh (known as Land Dayak in the past). However, some modern interpretations of the term also include the Orang Ulu groups in Sarawak.

== Ethnicity and languages ==
Dayaks do not speak just one language. Their indigenous languages belong to different subgroups of the Malayo-Polynesian languages, such as Land Dayak, Malayic, Sabahan (although the inclusion of Sabahan groups into Dayaks is not common in Malaysia), and Barito languages. Nowadays most Dayaks are bilingual, in addition to their native language, are well-versed in Indonesian and Malay, depending on their country of origin. Many of Borneo's languages are endemic (which means they are spoken nowhere else). This cultural and linguistic diversity parallels the high biodiversity and related traditional knowledge of Borneo.

It is estimated that around 170 languages and dialects are spoken on the island and some by just a few hundred people, thus posing a serious risk to the future of those languages and related heritage.

In 1954, Tjilik Riwut classified the various Dayak groups into 18 tribes throughout the island of Borneo, with 403 sub-tribes according to their respective native languages, customs, and cultures. However, he did not specify the name of the sub-tribes in his publication:

Cluster	Tribe	Number of sub-tribes	Regions with significant population
I. Ngaju	Ngaju; Ma'anyan; Lawangan; Dusun	53; 8; 21; 8	Central-Southern Borneo
II. Apukayan	Kenyah; Kayan; Bahau	24; 10; 26	Northeastern Borneo
III. Iban/Sea Dayaks	Iban	11	Northwestern inland and coastal Borneo
IV. Klemantan/Land Dayaks	Klemantan; Ketungau	47; 40	Northwestern outback Borneo
V. Punan	Basap; Punan; Ot	20; 24; 5	Central-East Borneo
VI. Murut	Idaan/Dusun; Murut; Tidung	6; 10; 28	Northern Borneo
VII. Ot Danum	Ot Danum	61	Central-Southern Borneo

== Religion ==
Religion of Dayak People in Indonesia
1. Roman Catholic (32.1%)
2. Sunni Muslim (31.6%)
3. Protestant (30.6%)
4. Hinduism/Kaharingan (4.80%)
5. Others, mostly Animism (0.90%)

=== Kaharingan ===
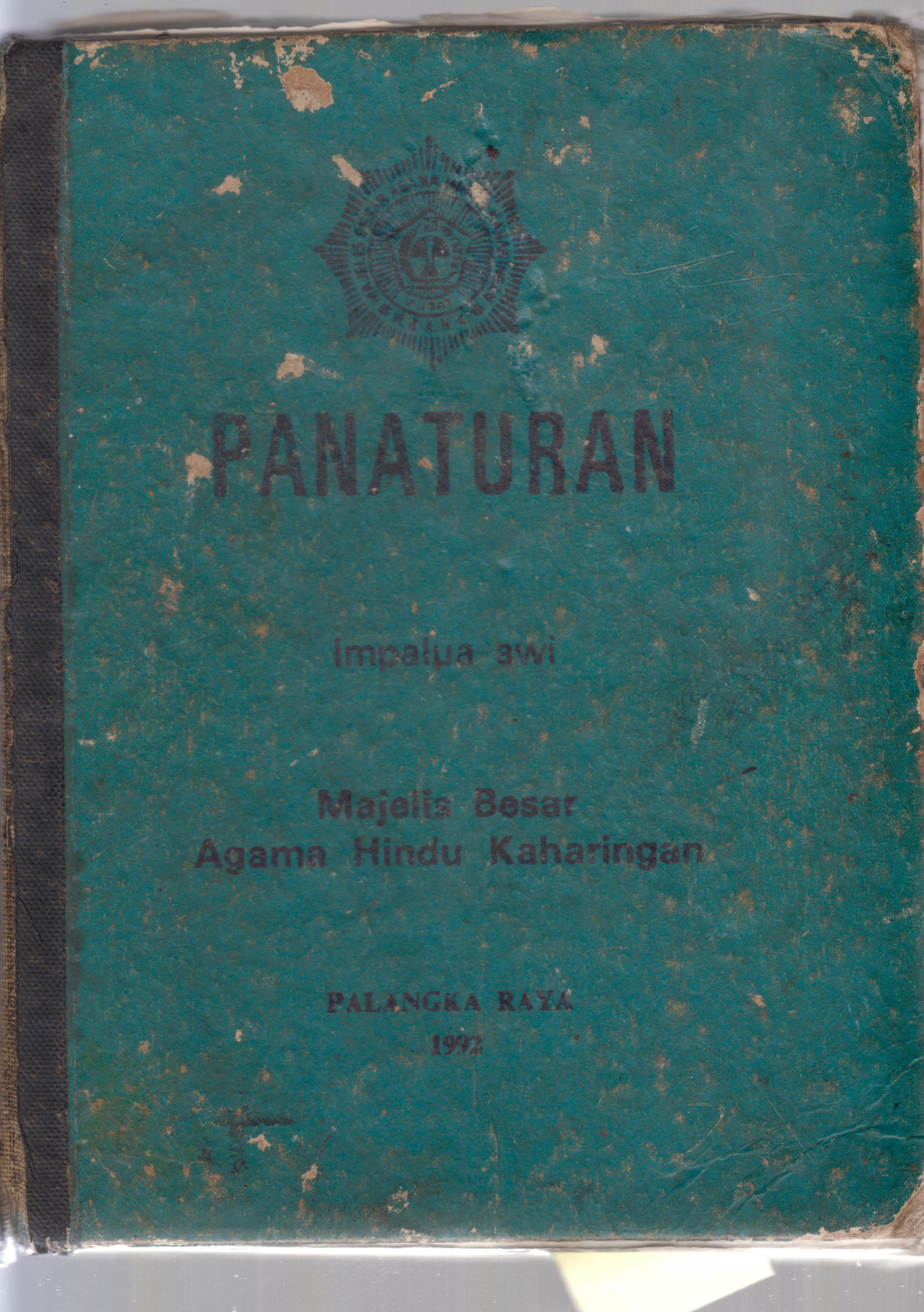
Panaturan scripture from 1992 edition.

In Indonesia, the Dayak indigenous religion has been given the name Kaharingan and may be said to be a form of animism. In 1945, during the Japanese occupation, the Japanese referred to Kaharingan as the religion of the Dayak people. During the New Order in the Suharto regime in 1980, the Kaharingan is registered as a form of Hinduism in Indonesia, as the Indonesian state prior to 2017 only recognised 6 forms of religion i.e. Islam, Protestantism, Roman Catholicism, Hinduism, Buddhism, and Confucianism respectively. The integration of Kaharingan with Hinduism is not due to the similarities in the theological system, but because Kaharingan is the oldest belief in Kalimantan. Unlike the development in Indonesian Kalimantan, Kaharingan is not used as a religious designation in Malaysia, Brunei and Singapore, thus the traditional Dayak belief system is categorized as a form of folk animism or paganism outside of the Indonesian border. After wider recognition of indigenous beliefs in Indonesia in 2017, Kaharingan has been sometimes included under the umbrella term Aliran Kepercayaan, though some Kaharingan activists still demands further recognition as a separate religion outside of the umbrella term.

The practice of Kaharingan differs from group to group, but shamans, specialists in ecstatic flight to other spheres, are central to Dayak religion and serve to bring together the various realms of Heaven (Upper-world) and earth, and even Under-world, for example healing the sick by retrieving their souls which are journeying on their way to the Upper-world land of the dead, accompanying and protecting the soul of a dead person on the way to their proper place in the Upper-world, presiding over annual renewal and agricultural regeneration festivals, etc. Death rituals are most elaborate when a noble (kamang) dies. Due to the institutionalization of Kaharingan beliefs in Indonesia, Kaharingan practices in Kalimantan have been recently codified and remolded into more organized religion, such as with codification of Panaturan as scripture of Kaharingan in 1971, creation of official Kaharingan body Hindu Kaharingan Religion Council (Majelis Besar Agama Hindu Kaharingan) in 1980, and standardization of its house of worship buildings called Balai Basarah. However, not all adherents agree with the Hindu classification; a rival body called the Indonesian Kaharingan Religion Council (Majelis Agama Kaharingan Indonesia) was formed to assert Kaharingan as an independent religion, distinct from Hinduism.

=== Christianity ===
Over the last two centuries, many Dayaks have converted to Christianity, making them the majority of Christians in Borneo, abandoning certain cultural rites and traditional practices in the process. Christianity was introduced by European missionaries in Borneo by Rheinische Missionsgesellschaft (later followed up by the Basler Mission). Religious differences between Muslim and Christian natives of Borneo have led, at various times, to communal tensions. Relations, however between all religious groups are generally good.

=== Islam ===
Traditionally, in many parts of Borneo, embracing the Muslim faith is equated with Malayisation (Indonesian/Malay: masuk Melayu), i.e. assimilation into the broader Malay ethnicity. There are, however, several Dayak sub-ethnicities (mainly in Central Kalimantan) that predominantly adhere to Islam, but self-identify as Dayaks. These include e.g. the Bakumpai people, who converted to Islam in the 19th century, but still have strong linguistic and cultural ties to the Ngaju people. They have adopted a positive attitude towards the label "Dayak" and self-identify as Muslim Dayaks.

== Society and customs ==
=== Economic activities ===
Historically, most of the Dayak people are swidden cultivators who supplement their incomes by seeking forest products, both for subsistence (ferns, medicinal plants, fibers, and timber) and for sale; by fishing and hunting and by periodic wage labor. Presently, many modern-day Dayaks are also actively engaged in many contemporary economic activities, especially in the urban areas of Borneo.

=== Gender Differences ===
Gender dynamics vary amongst different Dayak groups. Some Dayak groups are egalitarian, while are believed to often have gender inequalities. One place where gender inequality is commonly found in Dayak groups is in the political realm. Men often are of higher status than women when it comes to the political and religious aspects. It is even common for Dayak women to be illiterate due to many of them being unable to receive a proper education, which contributes to the difficulty of Dayak women being able achieve higher statuses than their male counterparts. Also, the roles that Dayak women often take on in the community, such as protecting the forest, are often undervalued. Dayak women are often expected to be responsible for a majority of the labor in the domestic sphere, while men are often expected to work outside of the home in order to provide for their families. Even though women are often expected to do a majority of the housework, Dayak males are still typically expected to also contribute in the domestic sphere. The males are often taught how to take care of domestic duties so that they are able to be independent and take care of themselves if necessary.

=== Egalitarianism ===
Although some Dayak groups promote gender inequality, some try to promote gender equality while still acknowledging that men and women are different. They believe that men and women are different, yet complementary to one another. Other Dayak groups, on the other hand, try their best to treat men and women as if they are not different from one another. It is not out of the norm to see men who belong to these groups take care of the domestic space while the women in their households do hard labor such as farm work.

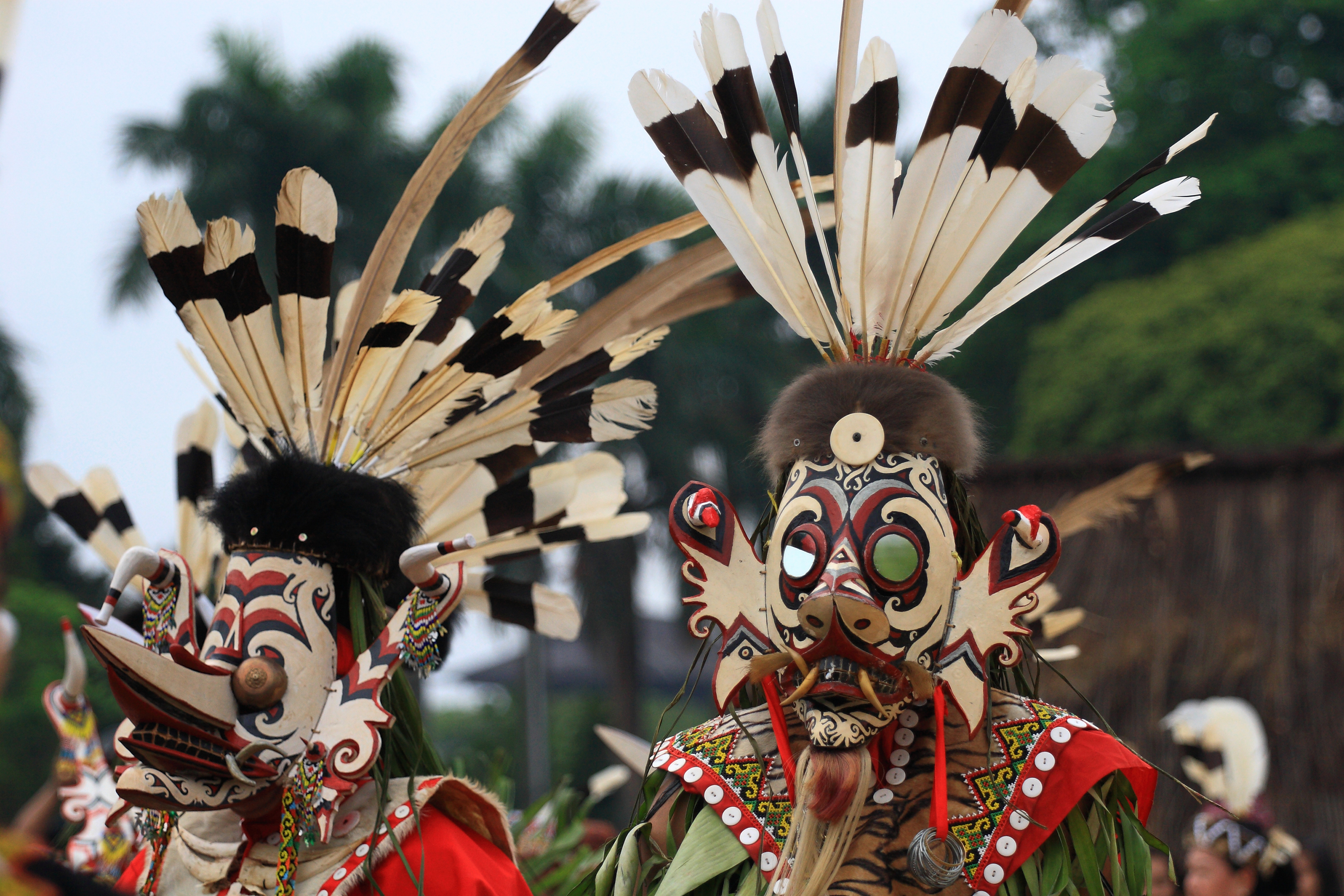
Hudoq dance, a Bahau performance before the land clearing ceremony

=== Toplessness ===
In the Indonesian archipelago, toplessness was the norm among the Dayak people, Javanese, and Balinese people of Indonesia before the introduction of Islam and contact with Western cultures. In Javanese and Balinese societies, women worked or rested comfortably topless. Among the Dayak, only big-breasted women or married women with sagging breasts covered their breasts because they interfered with their work. With the availability of shirts, toplessness was abandoned.

=== Tattoo ===
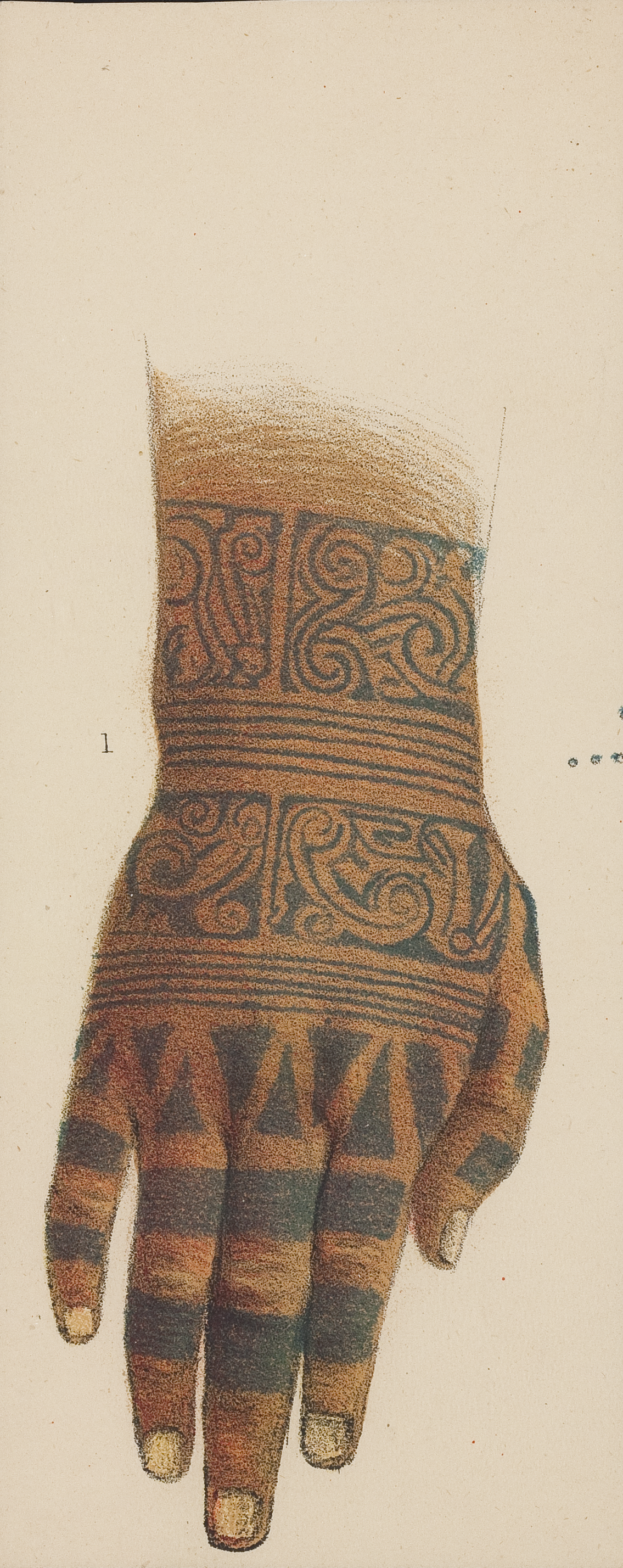
A Dayak tattoo design in Kalimantan, c. 1880.

In many Dayak societies, a tattoo is regarded as a sacred creation that consolidates together the images of humans, flora, and fauna into a single body art. The tattoo is used as a spiritual expression of life, to unify the living, the spiritual powers, and the universe.

Traditionally, there are various reasons why a Dayak man or woman would choose body art. For some, it was used to mark a person's ethnic origin and rank in society. For others, the tattoo served as an act of devotion, as a demonstration of skills, to commemorate a special occasion in life, or as a symbol for the rite of passage.

=== Elongated earlobes ===
Amongst several Dayak groups in the past, long female earlobes are regarded as a symbol of beauty. The elongation process usually begins when the child is about 4 years old. During the initial stage, her ears will be pierced by an earring, so that the hisang (a special heavy silver or bronze earring) can be worn on her ears.

A new hisang will gradually be added with age. After a woman is married, her hisang will potentially be up to 20 pieces per-ear. As the hisang was sourced from precious and expansive metals like silver and bronze, it can signify her status, wealth, and social standing within the society. Thus, the longer her earlobes, the more important she is to the community. Presently, the practice of having stretched earlobes is almost limited to the elderly, as the practice of applying hisang amongst newborn babies has been rare since the 1960s.

=== Longhouses ===
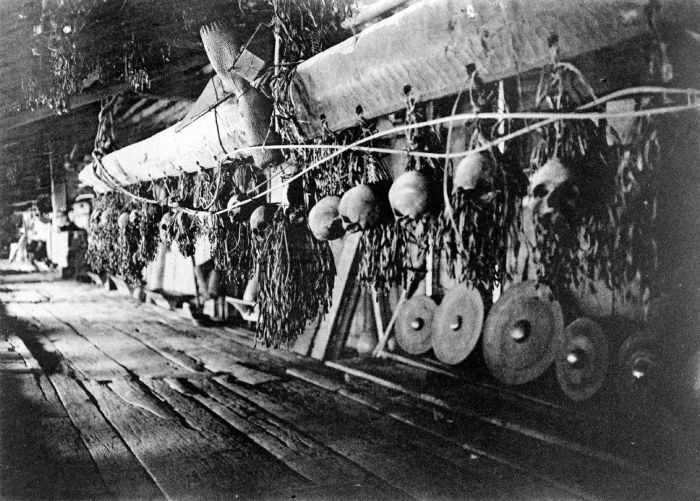
The gallery of a Kayan Dayak longhouse with skulls and weapons along the wall, exhibiting their headhunter culture

In the traditional Dayak society, the long house or Lamin House, is regarded as the heart of the community, it functions as the village, as well as the societal architectural expression. This large building, sometimes exceeding 200 meters in length, may be divided into independent household apartments. The building is also equipped with communal areas for cooking, ceremonies, socializing, and blacksmithing.

The superstructure is not solely about architecture and design. It is a part of the Dayak traditional political entity and administrative system. Thus, culturally the people residing in the longhouse are governed by the customs and traditions of the longhouse.

=== Beadworks ===
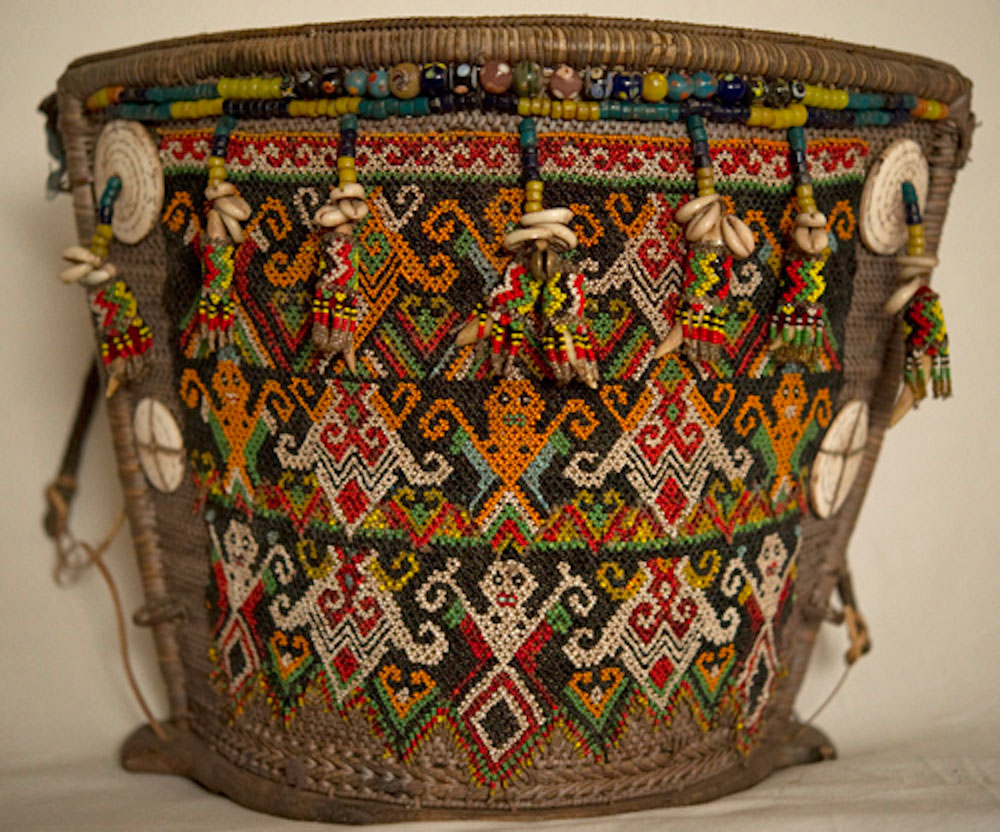
A traditional Dayak beaded baby carrier

Based on the archeological records in Borneo, it was discovered that the early inhabitants of the island had used organic materials to make simple beads. The beads were originally sourced from stones, bones, teeth, and shells. When the foreign traders arrived between the 8th-9th century, they further enhanced the ancient bead cultures of Borneo with the introduction of colourful glass beads. These early beads are usually small, in basic colours of red, yellow, white, turquoise, and black. These were followed by multicolored beads around the 1500s-1600s.

Traditional beadworks have occupied a pivotal status in various Dayak communities. In many Dayak cultures, beads are not solely regarded as ornamental objects, but they are a major cultural influence. Some of the beads only being used for ritualistic practices and are worn during such ceremonies. While heirloom beads (known as pesaka) are regarded as an important family heirloom and oftentimes being inherited from one generation to another.

=== Metal-working ===
Metalworking is elaborately developed in making mandaus (machetes – parang in Malay and Indonesian). The blade is made of softer iron, to prevent breakage, with a narrow strip of a harder iron wedged into a slot in the cutting edge for sharpness in a process called ngamboh (iron-smithing).

In headhunting, it was necessary to be able to draw the parang quickly. For this purpose, the mandau is fairly short, which also better serves the purpose of trail cutting in dense forests. It is holstered with the cutting edge facing upwards and at that side, there is an upward protrusion on the handle, so it can be drawn very quickly with the side of the hand without having to reach over and grasp the handle first. The hand can then grasp the handle while it is being drawn. The combination of these three factors (short, cutting edge up, and protrusion) makes for an extremely fast drawing-action.

=== Headhunting and peacemaking ===
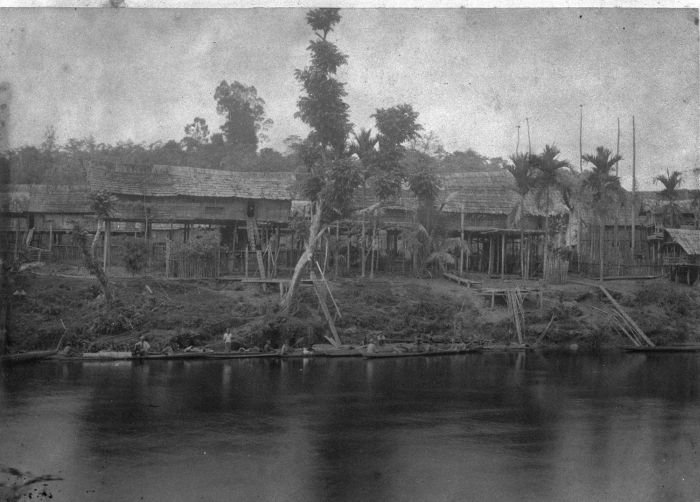
The Dayak longhouses along the Kahayan River taken in Tumbang Anoi village (c. 1894).

In the past, the Dayaks were feared for their ancient tradition of headhunting practices (the ritual is also known as Ngayau by the Dayaks).

Among the most prominent legacies during the colonial rule in the Dutch Borneo (present-day Kalimantan) is the Tumbang Anoi Agreement held in 1894 in Damang Batu, Central Kalimantan (the seat of the Kahayan Dayaks). That was a formal meeting that gathered all the Dayak tribes in Kalimantan for a peace resolution. In the meeting, which is reputed to have taken several months, the Dayak people throughout Kalimantan agreed to end the headhunting tradition as it was believed that the tradition caused conflict and tension between various Dayak groups. The meeting ended with a peace resolution by the Dayak people.

Subsequently, the headhunting began to surface again in the mid-1940s, when the Allied powers encouraged the practice against the Japanese occupation of Borneo. It also slightly surged in the late 1960s when the Indonesian government encouraged Dayaks to purge the Chinese from interior Kalimantan who were suspected of supporting communism in mainland China, and in a period of high tension between Madurese emigrants and Dayak during the Sambas and Sampit conflicts around the turn of the century.

=== Military ===
The Dayak soldiers or trackers are regarded as equivalent in bravery to the Royal Scots or the Gurkha soldiers. The Sarawak Rangers were absorbed into the British Army as the Far East Land Forces which could be deployed anywhere in the world but upon the formation of Malaysia in 1963, it formed the basis of the present-day Royal Ranger Regiment.

While in Indonesia, Tjilik Riwut was remembered as he led the first airborne operation by the Indonesian National Armed Forces on 17 October 1947. The team was known as MN 1001, with 17 October celebrated annually as the anniversary date for the Indonesian Air Force Paskhas, which traces its origins to that pioneer paratroop operation in Borneo.

== Gallery ==
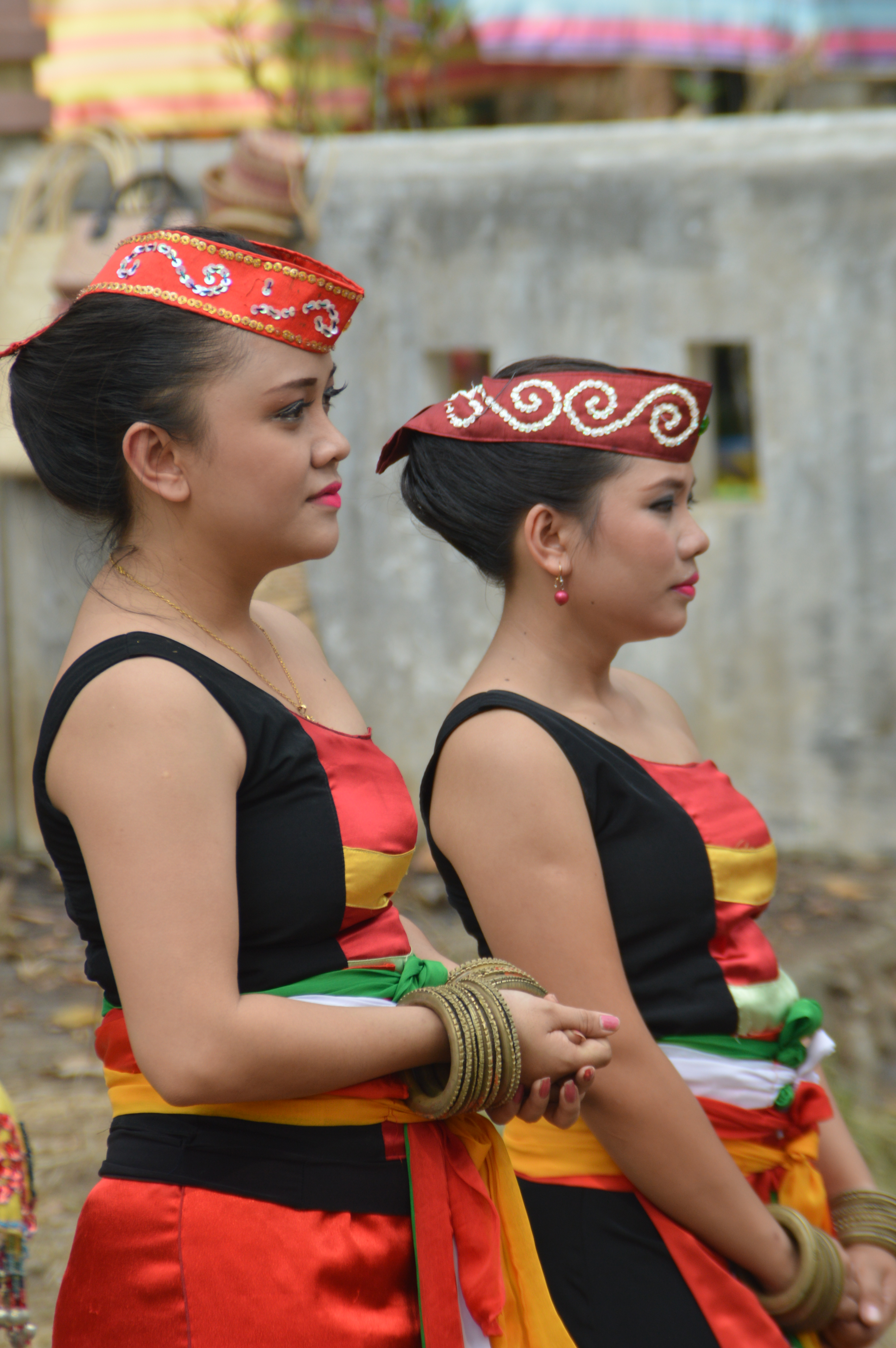
Ma'anyan women during Keang Ethnic Festival

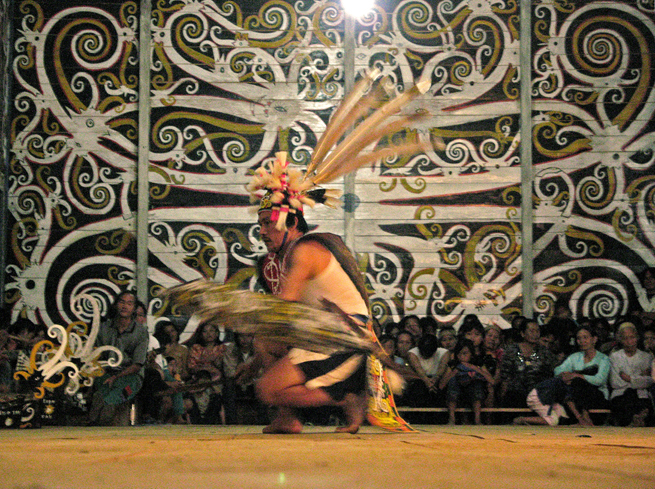
Colourful wall art by the Kenyah people

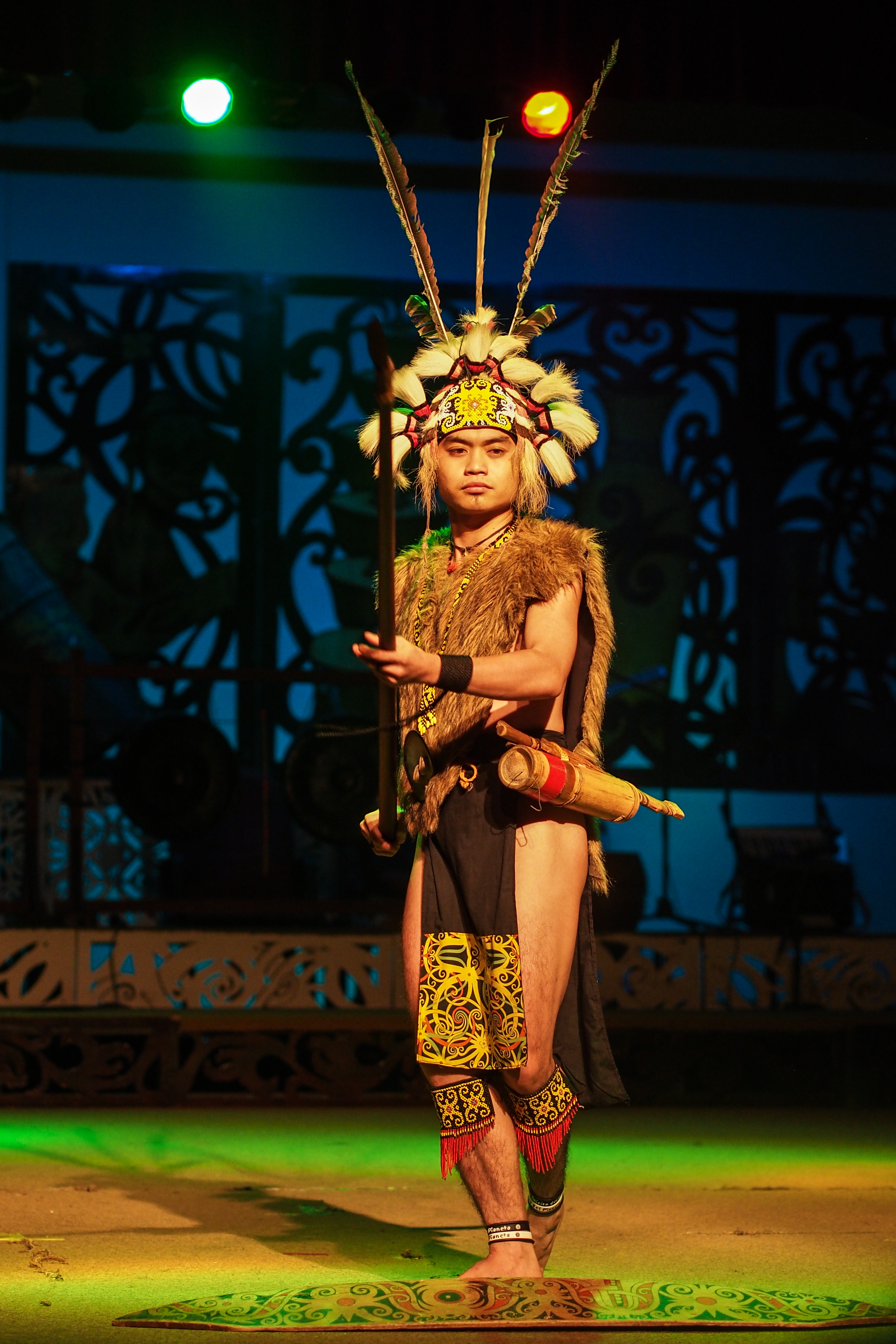
An Iban (Sea Dayak) man from Sarawak in his warrior costume

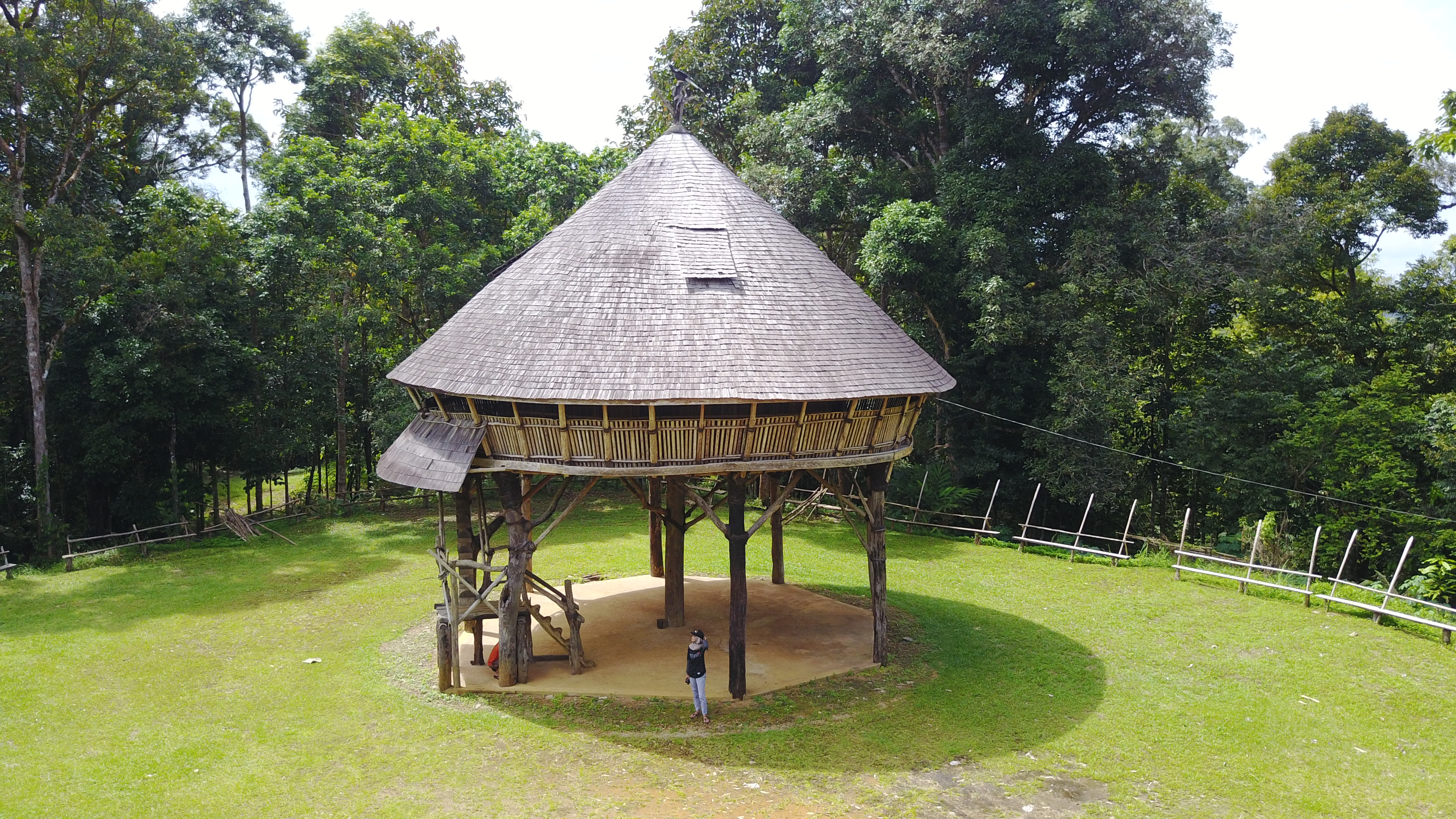
A Baluk in Jagoi Babang, West Kalimantan, the ceremonial hall for Bidayuh (Land Dayak) people

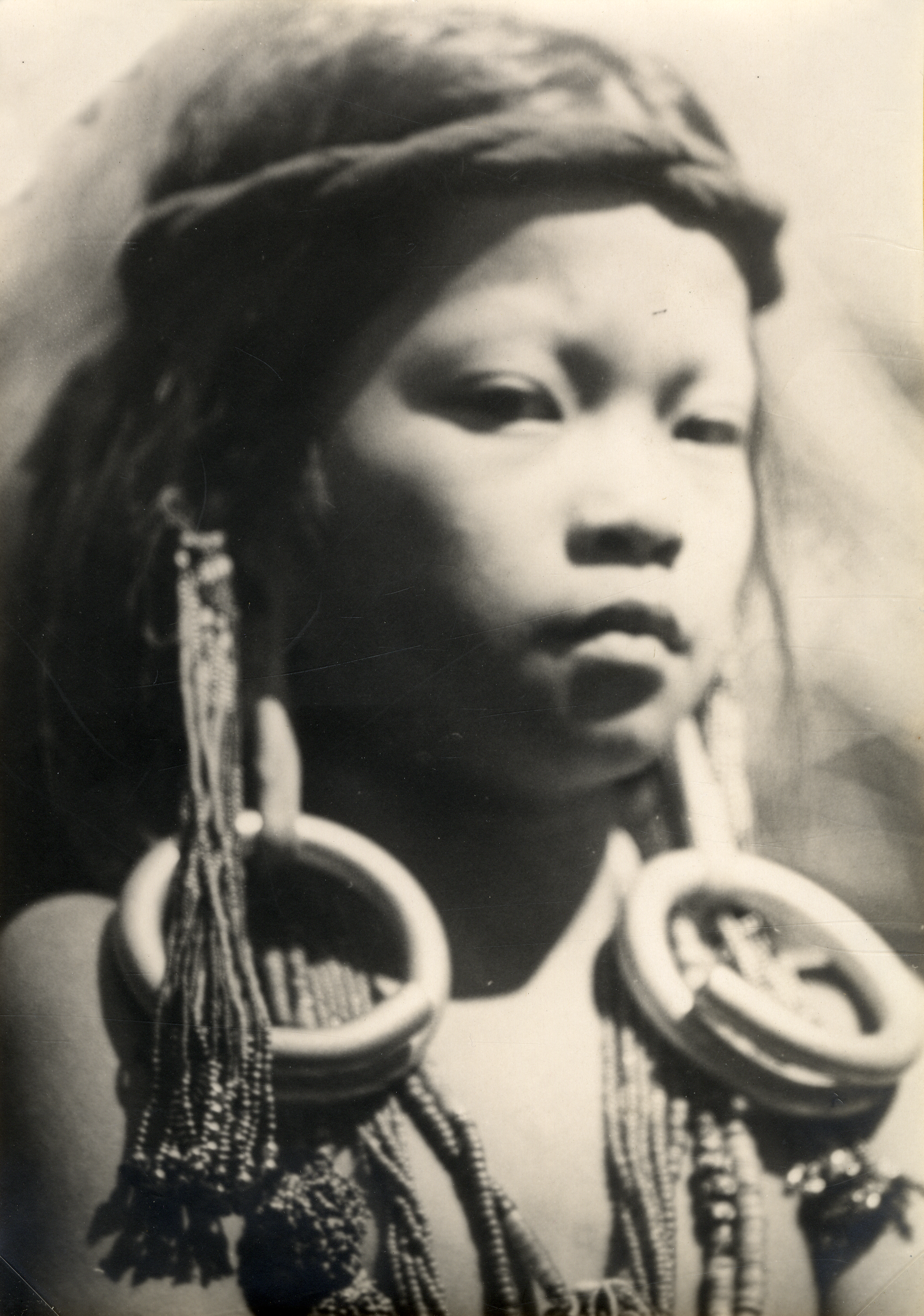
A Punan girl, some Dayak tribes are known for their elongated earlobes formed by iron earrings (1931–1932)

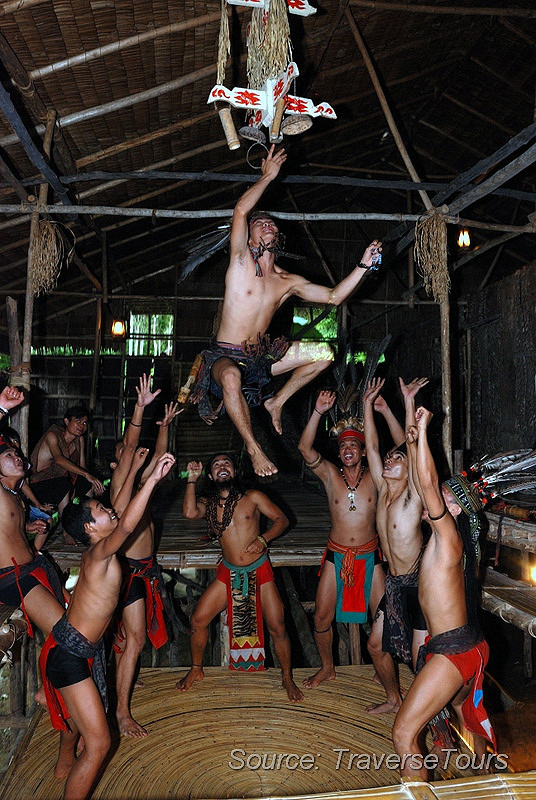
Lansaran, a Murut traditional trampoline game

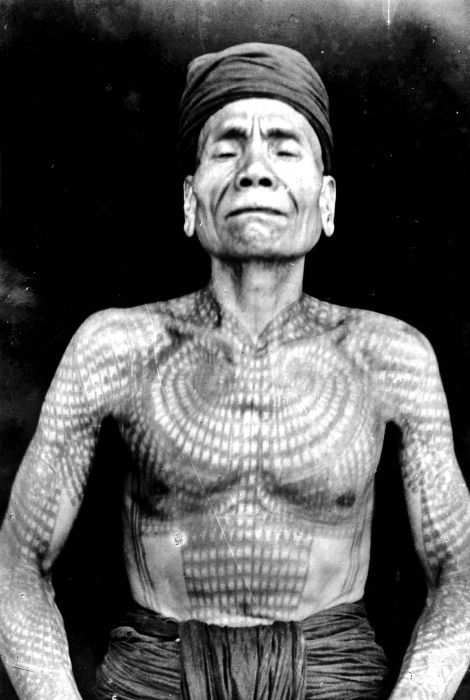
A tattooed Dayak man from Central Borneo, possibly of Ot Danum origin (1880–1920)

== See also ==
- List of Dayak people
- Sapeh
- View of the tiger
- Dusun people, another classification term for Bornean indigenous people used in northwestern Sabah for Dusunic-speaking peoples
- Paitan people, another classification term for Bornean indigenous people used in northeastern Sabah for Paitanic-speaking peoples
