= Bahau language =

Language

Bahau
- Kajan
- Native to: Indonesia
- Region: Borneo
- Ethnicity: Bahau people
- Native speakers: 19,000 (2007)
- Language family: Austronesian: Malayo-Polynesian; Greater North Borneo ?; Kayanic; Kayan–Murik; Kayan; Bahau

Language codes
- ISO 639-3: bhv
- Glottolog: baha1257

Kayan Mekam or Bahau (Kajan) is a Kayanic language of Borneo.
