= Aoheng language =

Austronesian language spoken in Kalimantan, Indonesia

Aoheng
- Penihing
- Native to: Indonesia
- Region: East Kalimantan
- Native speakers: (2,600 cited 1981)
- Language family: Austronesian: Malayo-Polynesian; Kayan–Murik; Muller-Schwaner 'Punan'; Aoheng
- Dialects: Seputan

Language codes
- ISO 639-3: pni
- Glottolog: aohe1237

Aoheng, or Penihing, is a Kayan language of East Kalimantan, Indonesia, one of several spoken by the Penan people.

== Phonology ==
Consonants
	Labial	Alveolar	Retroflex	Palatal	Velar	Glottal
Plosive	p b	t d		tʃ (dʒ)	k (g)	ʔ
Fricative		s				h
Nasal	m	n		ɲ	ŋ	
Flap		ɾ	ɽ			
Approximant	(w)	l		(j)		

- The consonants /dʒ g j w/ only occur in loanwords.
- /b/ can be heard as /β/ word-initially and intervocalically.

Vowels
	Front	Central	Back
High	i	ʉ	
Near-high	ɪ		ʊ
Mid	e	ə	o
Low		a	

- /ə/ may be pronounced as [ø] or [ɔ].
