= Hovongan language =

Austronesian language spoken in Kalimantan, Indonesia

Hovongan
- Punan Bungan
- Native to: Indonesia
- Region: West Kalimantan
- Native speakers: (1,000 cited 1991)
- Language family: Austronesian: Malayo-Polynesian; Kayan–Murik; Muller-Schwaner 'Punan'; Hovongan

Language codes
- ISO 639-3: hov
- Glottolog: hovo1239

Hovongan (Hobongan), or Punan Bungan, is a Kayan language of West Kalimantan, Indonesia, one of several spoken by the Penan people.
