= Klemantan people =

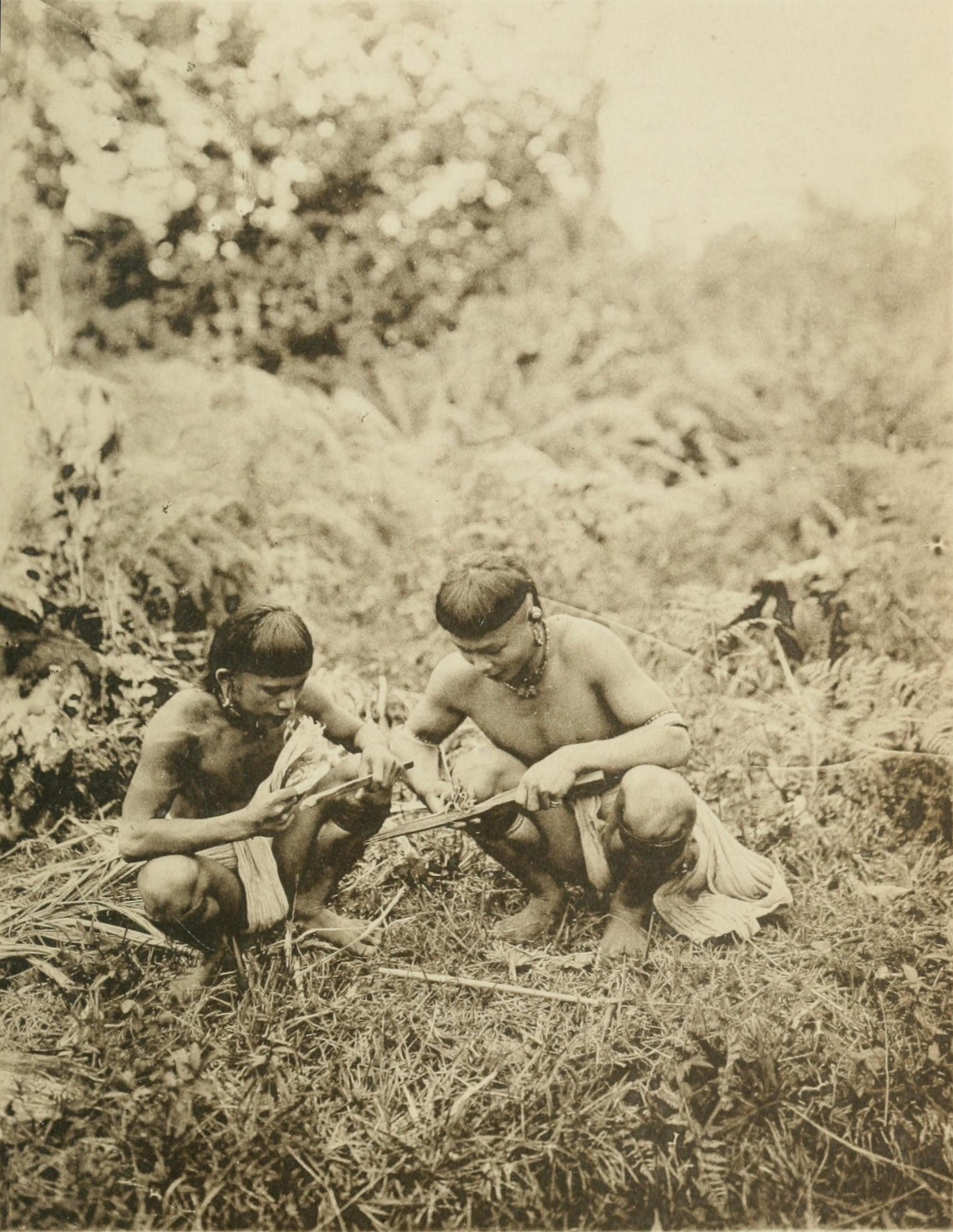
Two native Borneans designated as "Klemantans" by Charles Hose. Original caption in his 1912 book: Klemantans making fire in the jungle by sawing one piece of bamboo across another.

The Klemantan people were a purported ethnic group indigenous to the island of Borneo. The term was established in Western literature by British scientist and colonial administrator Charles Hose in the early 20th century, but has since been rejected as an invented term of convenience that does not properly represent the people it claims to describe. Since then, the term has fallen largely out of use.

== Origin ==
Hose had decades-long experience as a colonial administrator of Sarawak, at that time an independent kingdom ruled by the British Brooke dynasty on the northwestern coast of Borneo. When describing the native people of Sarawak, Hose categorized them into six different "principal groups": Ibans, Kayans, Kenyahs, Muruts, Punans, and the "Klemantans". While the other five groupings are considered to be valid ethnic groups, "Klemantan" was basically a catch-all category that contained every native group that could not otherwise be fitted into the existing 5 categories. Thus, by his definition, a Klemantan was every native Bornean who was not an Iban, a Kayan, a Kenyah, a Murut or a Punan. This in Hose's eyes did not only include numerous smaller groups and communities within Sarawak, but also the native groups living in the Dutch part of Borneo at that time, about whom Charles Hose had no first-hand knowledge.

Later scholars disclaimed the existence of the Klemantan people as a valid ethnic category, as the term merely represents a European view-point rather than the people's own and ultimately was made up for pure convenience. French cultural anthropologist Jérôme Rousseau, for example, forwarded the question why Hose "felt compelled to invent a concept which corresponds to no social, cultural, geographical, or historical reality."

== Klemantan and Kalimantan ==
The modern-day Indonesian name for Borneo island, Kalimantan, is derived from the same root as Klemantan.
