= Krios =

Krios may refer to:

People and figures

- Crius, (Ancient Greek: Κρεῖος) a figure in Ancient Greek mythology
- Krio people, an ethnic group in Sierra Leone
- Vangelis Krios (born 1973) Greek soccer player

Places

- Krios (star), the star HD 240429, which is in a wide binary system with star HD 240430
- Aries (constellation), also sometimes called Krios
- Krios (stream), (Greek: Κριός) a stream in Aigeira, Achaea, Greece
- Krios, Evros, Thrace, Greece; a village
- Krios, a fictional planet first mentioned in the 1992 Star Trek episode "The Perfect Mate"

== See also ==
- Krio (disambiguation)
