= List of Dayak people =

This is a list of notable Dayak people.

== Notable Dayaks ==
=== Indonesia ===
- Tjilik Riwut – National Hero of Indonesia and the first Governor of Central Kalimantan
- Reinout Sylvanus - 3rd Governor of Central Kalimantan
- Willy Ananias - 4th Governor of Central Kalimantan
- Agustin Teras Narang - 9th Governor of Central Kalimantan
- Agustiar Sabran- 11th Governor of Central Kalimantan
- Sugianto Sabran - 10th Governor of Central Kalimantan
- Oevaang Oeray – 3rd Governor of West Kalimantan
- Cornelis M.H. – The 8th Governor of West Kalimantan
- Yurnalis Ngayoh - Vice Governor and 10th Governor of East Kalimantan.
- Olla Ramlan - Indonesian TV personality
- Alue Dohong - First Dayak Deputy Minister of Indonesia
- Veddriq Leonardo - First Dayak won Gold Olympic Games.

=== Malaysia ===
- Alena Murang - singer-songwriter, sape player, visual artist and educator who sings in endangered languages including Kelabit and Kenyah.
- Baru Bian - the former Malaysian Minister.
- Bertrand Rhodict Lises - national diver.
- Bonnie Bunyau Gustin - powerlifter and 2020 Summer Paralympics gold medalist.
- Bryan Nickson Lomas - former diver and the youngest Malaysian athlete to qualify for 2004 Summer Olympics when he was 14.
- Francisca Luhong James – Miss Universe Malaysia 2020 representatives.
- Henry Golding – Malaysian-born English actor
- Idris Jala - technocrat. He was the first Kelabit to be appointed a federal cabinet minister.
- Jugah Barieng – Malaysian politician and former minister
- Kanang anak Langkau – most decorated military soldier in Malaysian history, regarded as a national hero.
- Mutang Tagal - The President of Senate in Malaysia.
- Pandelela Rinong – Malaysian national diving athlete
- Richard Riot Jaem - the former Malaysian Minister.
- Stephen Kalong Ningkan – the first Chief Minister of Sarawak
- Tawi Sli – the second Chief Minister of Sarawak
- Watson Nyambek - former national sprinter.
