= Kriol =

The word Kriol may mean:

== People ==
- Belizean Creole people, also known as Kriols

== Languages ==
- Creole language
- English-based creole languages
- The English-based Australian Kriol language
- The English-based Belizean Creole language, also called Belizean Kriol
- The English-based Bocas del Toro Creole, or Colón Creole (Kriol), spoken in Panama
- The Portuguese-based Cape Verdean Creole
- The Portuguese-based Guinea-Bissau Creole
- The English-based Torres Strait Creole
- The Spanish-based Palenquero
- The English-based San Andrés-Providencia Creole
- The English-based Miskito Coast Creole

== See also ==
- Creole language
- Creole peoples
- Krio (disambiguation)
- Kreol (disambiguation)
- Kriolu
- Kreyol (disambiguation)
