= Merap language =

Language

Merap
- Mbraa / Mpraa
- Native to: Indonesia
- Region: Langap, South Malinau, Malinau, North Kalimantan
- Ethnicity: Merap
- Native speakers: (200 cited 1981)
- Language family: Austronesian: Malayo-Polynesian; Greater North Borneo; Kayanic; Murik–Merap; Merap

Language codes
- ISO 639-3: puc
- Glottolog: mera1243
- ELP: Punan Merap

Merap (Mbraa) is an Austronesian language, spoken in the village of Langap in South Malinau district, Malinau Regency, North Kalimantan, Indonesia. Soriente (2015) classifies Mbraa (also known as Merap) as a Kayan–Murik (Modang-Bahau) language.

== Phonology ==
Merap phonology has departed significantly from Proto-Malayo Polynesian. Merap stress is word-final, and word shape is sesquisyllabic (a minor penultimate syllable followed by a stressed full ultima). The number of vowel contrasts has increased significantly as well. Where Proto-Malayo-Polynesian had four vowels (*i, *u, *a, and *ə) Merap has well over twenty contrasts, including diphthongs, triphthongs, and nasality distinctions.

=== Consonants ===
	Labial	Alveolar	Palatal	Velar	Glottal
Stop	p b	t d	c ɟ	k ɡ	ʔ
Fricative		s			h
Nasal	m	n	ɲ	ŋ	
Lateral		l			
Trill		r			

- /b/ is pronounced as implosive [ɓ] in the coda of final syllables.
- /ɡ/ except after /ŋ/ is rare, and occurs only in loanwords.

=== Vowels ===
		Front	Central		Back
		Front	short	long	Back
Close		i			u
Mid		ɛ	ə		o
Open			a	aː	
Diphthongs	closing	iw ɛj əw ae̯ ai̯ ao̯ au̯ oj uj			
Diphthongs	centering	iə̯ aə̯ uə̯			
Diphthongs	nasalised	ĩə̯ ãə̯ ũə̯			
Triphthongs		ɛjə̯ ajə̯ awə̯ ojə̯			

- The distinction between /a/ and /aː/ only occurs in final syllables before glottals /ʔ/ and /h/.
