= Kreol (software) =

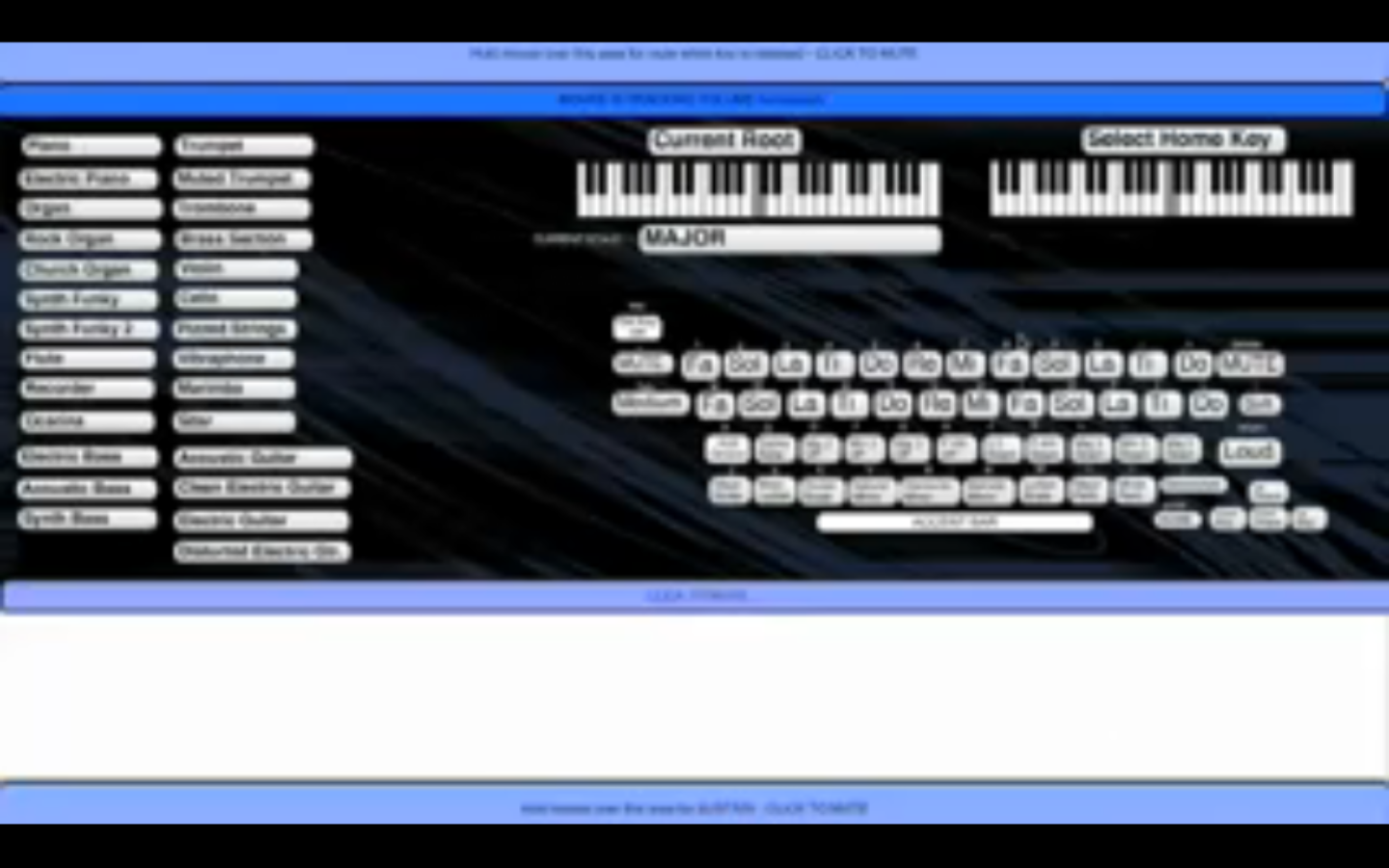
- Kreol
- Developers: Mike Block, JJ Gangi, and Michael Scott-Nelson
- Operating system: Mac OS X and Windows
- Type: MIDI
- License: discontinued
- Website: www.Kreolmusic.com

Kreol is a piece of software that turns a traditional qwerty keyboard into a musical instrument played by typing. Kreol is played by pressing keys which correspond to musical notes or chords depending on how the user commands it. "But unlike a normal piano, Kreol players can alter the 'Do' note – the root of the scale – in order to play the same melody in a different key, sort of like a guitarist sliding a chord to a new area of the fretboard." Kreol has phrase and pitchbend capabilities operated by the mouse. Kreol also includes drums and chord modes, so with three performers you can play lead, chords and rhythm. Kreol was conceived and created by Mike Block and JJ Gangi.
