= Kreyol =

Kreyol may mean:

- Antillean Creole (Kreyòl)
- Haitian Creole (Kreyòl ayisyen)
- Liberian Kreyol (Kreyol)
- Louisiana Creole (Kréyòl (la) Lwizyàn)
- French Guianese Creole (Kréyòl gwiyanè)

== See also ==
- Creole language, a stable natural language that develops from the simplifying and mixing of different languages into a new one
- Krio (disambiguation)
- Kriol (disambiguation)
- Kriolu
- Dominican Creole (Kwéyòl)
- Saint Lucian Creole (Kwéyòl)
- Sranan Tongo (Surinamese Creole)
