= Kayan people (Borneo) =

Ethnic group in Southeast Asia

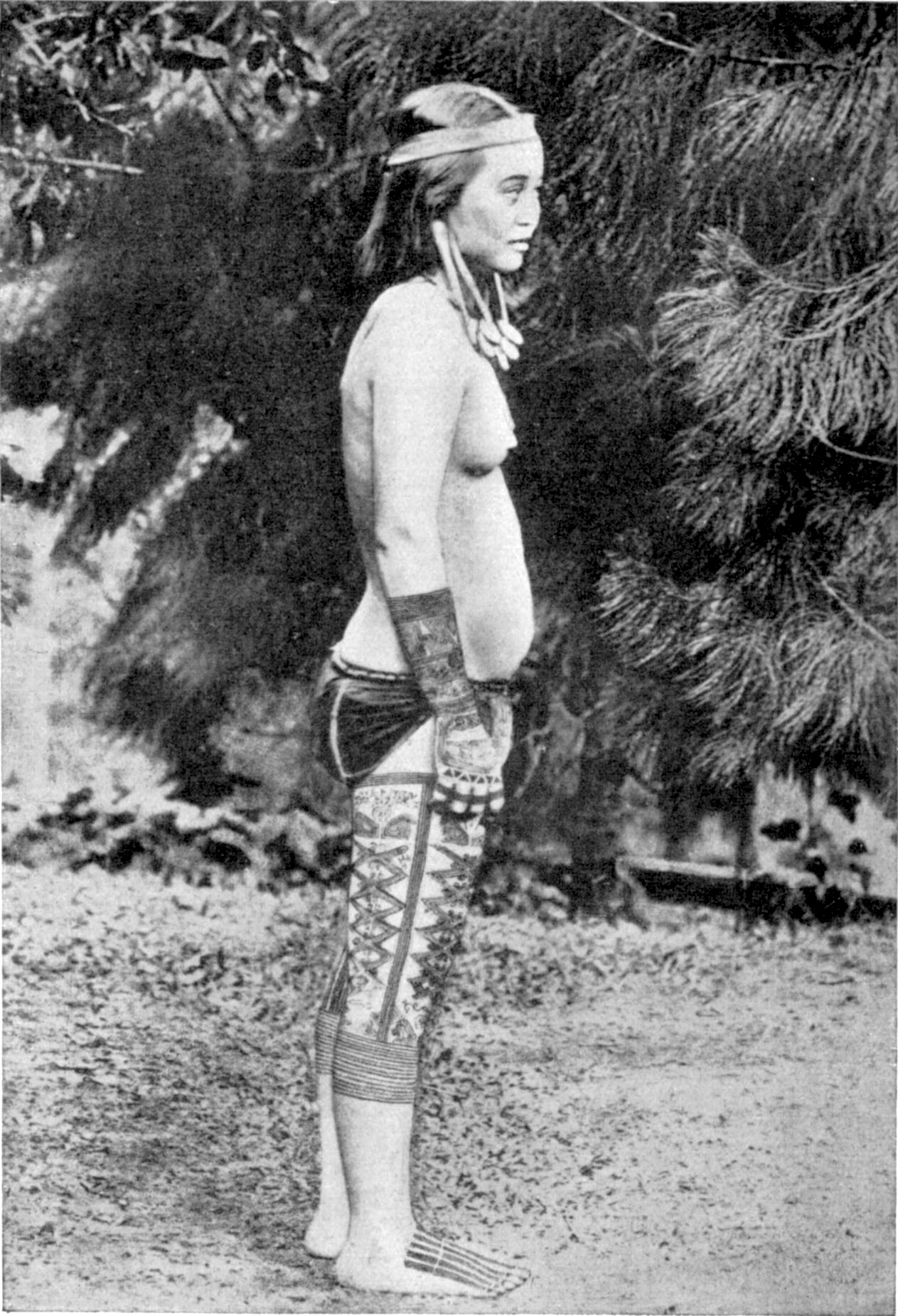
- "The Tattooing of a Married Kayan Woman," (c. 1896-98), photograph by William Henry Furness III. Illustration from The Home-Life of Borneo Head-Hunters (1902).

Total population
- 200,000

Regions with significant populations
- Borneo
- Malaysia (Sarawak): 30,000 (2010)

Languages
- Kayan-Murik languages (Kayan), Indonesian, Malay (Sarawak Malay), and English

Religion
- Christianity (predominantly), Bungan (Folk religion), and Islam

Related ethnic groups
- Bahau • Bulungan • Kenyah

The Kayan people are an indigenous tribe from the island of Borneo, both in Sarawak, Malaysia and Kalimantan, Indonesia. Categorised as a part of the Dayak people, they are similar to their neighbours, the Kenyah people, with which they are grouped together with the Bahau people under the Apo Kayan people group. The Bornean Kayan are distinct from, and not to be confused with the Kayan people of Myanmar.

The population of Kayan people may be around 200,000. They are part of a larger grouping of indigenous people referred collectively as the Orang Ulu (upriver people). Similarly to other Dayak people, they are known for being fierce warriors, former headhunters, adept in upland rice cultivation, and having extensive tattoos on women and stretched earlobes amongst both sexes.

== Origins ==
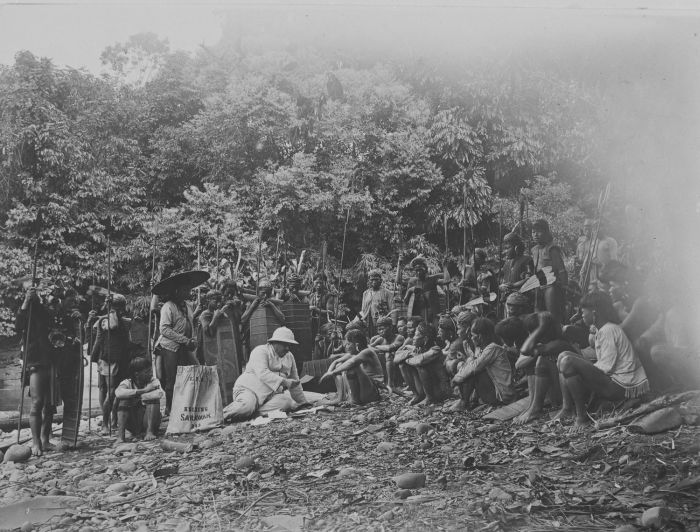
A European man having a discussion with leaders of the Kayan people in Sarawak, circa 1900 to 1940

Based on oral history, the Kayan people originated from the Kayan river in the North Kalimantan province of Borneo, where they lived along the upper Kayan, the middle Kapuas and Mahakam rivers. The group expanded to the south in Sarawak in historic times, generating some conflicts with the Iban tribes that were expanding north at the same time. They have settled in Sarawak on the middle Baram River, the Bintulu River and along the Rajang River, having been pressed back a little during the late 19th century. In 1863, in West Kalimantan, the Iban people migrated to the upstreams of Saribas River and Rajang River and started to attack the Kayan people in those areas and continued doing so northwards and later eastwards. Wars and headhunting attacks have caused many other tribes to be displaced, including the Kayan people, who make up of 1.4% of the West Kutai Regency population. Significant expansion of the Kayan sub-group Uma Apan to east Borneo occurred during the 17th century, which resulted in their conversion to Islam forming the ethnogenesis of the Bulungan people and the Sultanate of Bulungan.

== Language ==
The Kayan language belongs to the Malayo-Polynesian branch of the Austronesian language family.

== Main activities and culture ==
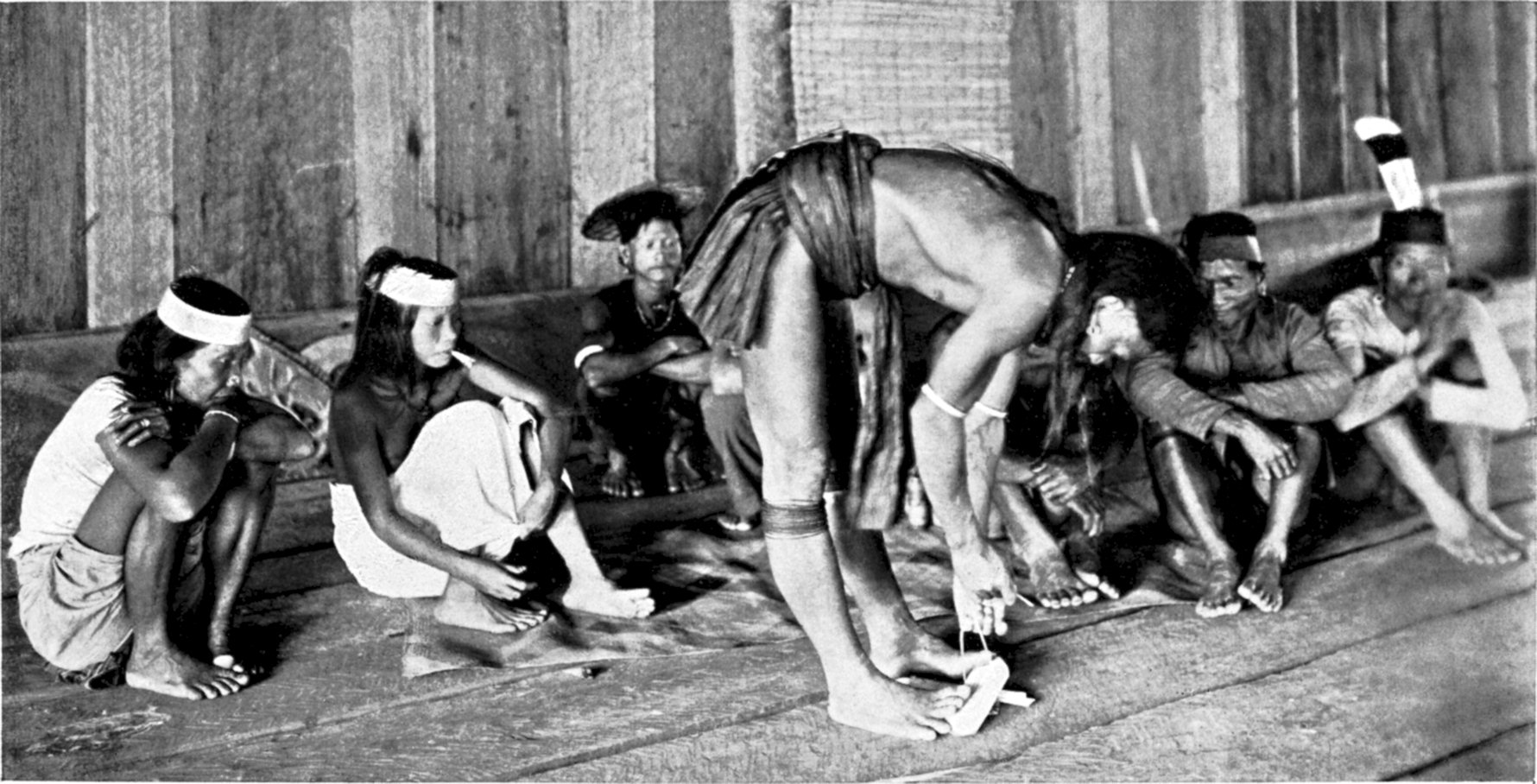
A Kayan person using rattan to saw a piece of firewood.

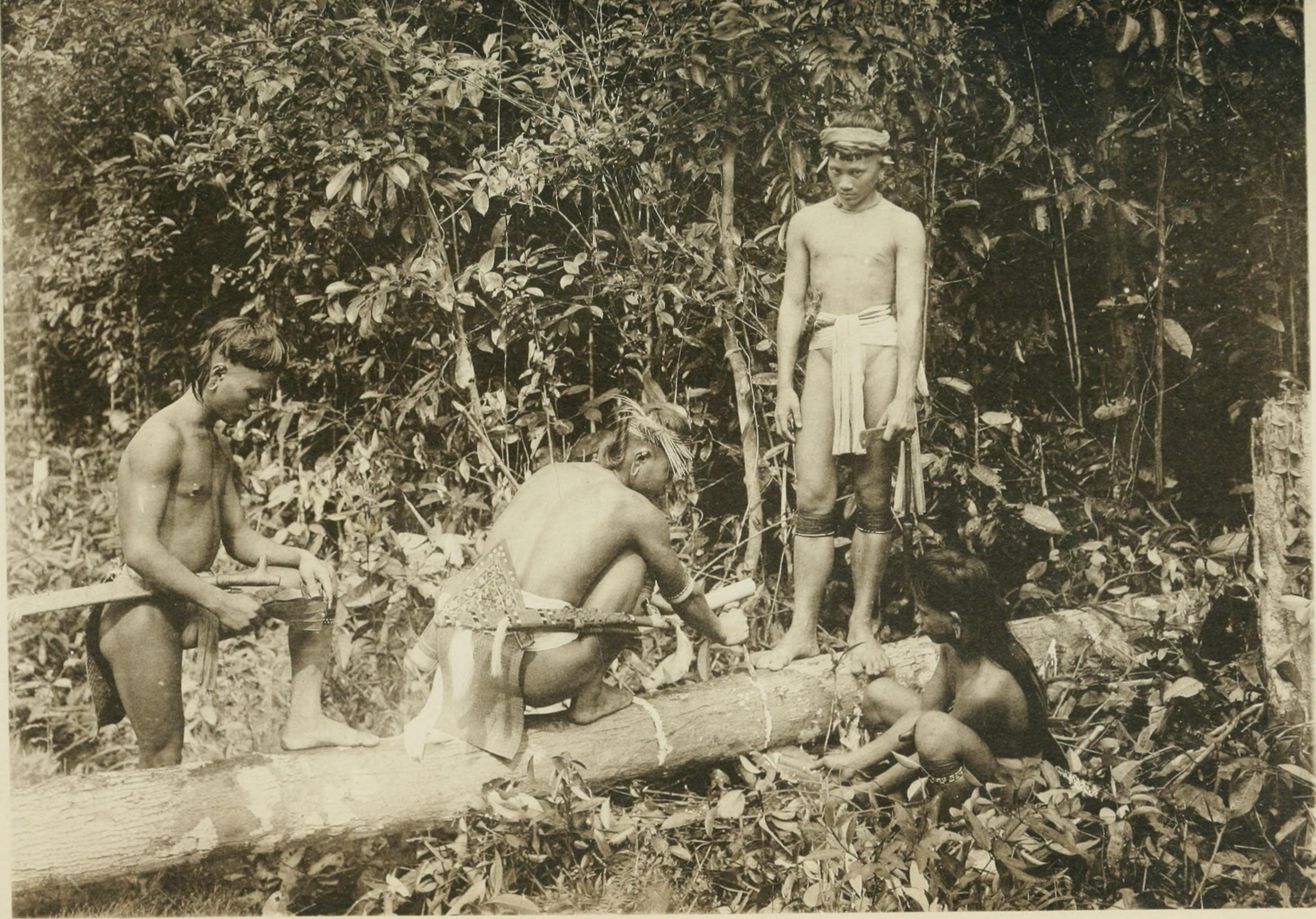
Kayan people harvesting the sap of a gutta-percha tree (from Hose & McDougall, 1912)

Their basic culture is similar to the other Dayak people in Borneo. The agriculture is based upon shifting cultivation techniques and the cultivation of Upland rice. Other farming such as sago, corn, yams, pumpkin and tobacco are also cultivated. During the years of famine, sago was mined. Traditionally, fishing played an important role, as well as hunting wild animals with sumpitan. They were engaged in breeding pigs and chickens, while dogs were kept for hunting (ngaso') and ritual purposes.

Kayan craftspeople are excellent blacksmiths (the Malat or swords are the main item of exchange), boat builders and carpenters. Loom, weaving, production of tans, arts, wood carving, making of masks and pottery were also developed. Before the arrival of Christian missionaries, the practice of tribal tattooing was still in place. Only women were allowed to become tattooists and they tattooed mostly girls and women to signify womanhood; the patterns of the tattoos (tedek) were intricate and detailed, while men got their tattoos for ornamental reasons. Both women and men had their earlobes stretched.

Furthermore, the Kayan people are renowned in their storytelling and song writing traditions. They welcome and honour visitors during celebrations, weddings, and major events by performing Parap, a form of improvised poetic singing. They also pass down their history to fellow villagers through Tekna', a traditional form of sung epic storytelling. Traditional Kayan songs include "Alam Lening" (Dayak Kayaan Mendalam, Kalbar) and "Lung Kayaan Mendalam".

Some of the practices and traditions have either died out or have nearly vanished due to outside influence and contact with colonialists, missionaries and the modernisation of the Borneo region since the 20th century and onward. Recently, younger indigenous people of Sarawak, including Orang Ulu youths are making efforts in revitalizing the practices.

== Social structure ==
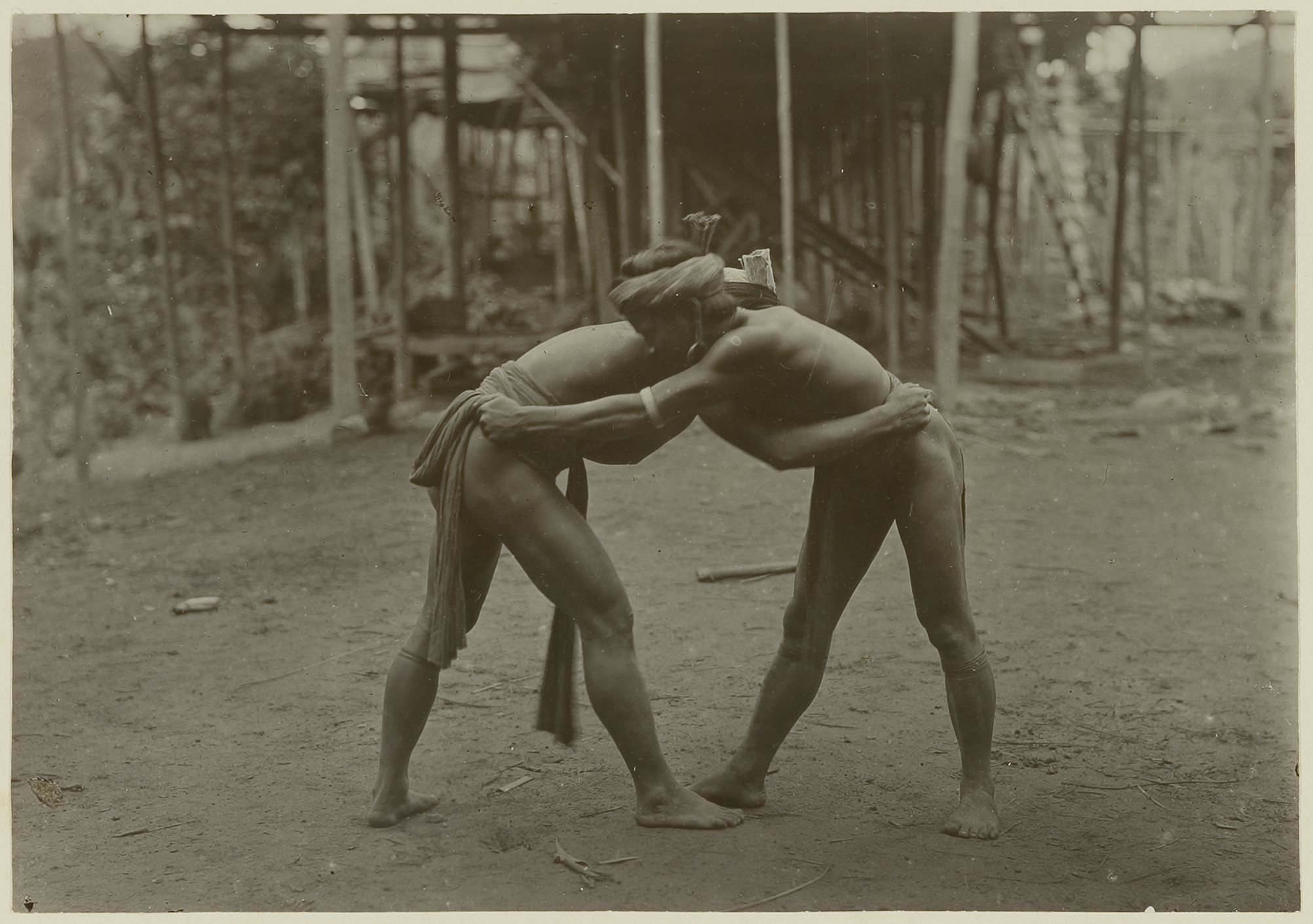
Kayan wrestling at upper mahakam, central Borneo. Photo taken between c.1898 and 1900

Traditionally, they lived in long houses on river banks. Their settlement consists of one or several long houses as long as 300 meters, which can accommodate up to 100 families (400–600 people) and consist of a common veranda and rooms. Residents of a long house constitute a tribal community. The Kayan people are divided into three endogamous estate groups; "house owning group" or aristocrat (ipun uma, maren, or keta'u), community members or commoners (panyin) and slaves (dipen). Among some Kayan, there is a fourth estate, the lower aristocrats (hipuy ok). Among the nobility, marriages are usually outside of the community, sometimes with other ethnic groups; while community members and slaves usually marry within the community. The leader is usually elected from the nobility class (in the 19th century, he also served as a military leader). The settlement is bi-localized, and the filiation is bilateral.

== Religion ==
The Kayan people developed a religion and a complex cult (bounty hunting and human sacrifices that disappeared at the beginning of the 20th century, as well as shamanism). The core event was the feast of collected heads, during which warrior initiations and funeral ceremonies were held. In the 20th century, some Kayan people were converted to Christianity, while others developed an indigenous religious reform after World War II, Adat Bungan. This reform started with the Kenyah Lepo' Tau of Long Nawang.

== Notable people ==
- Liwan Lagang - the current assistant Minister of Sarawak.
- Francisca Luhong James - Miss Universe Malaysia 2020 and a part-time model. She is of mixed Kayan, Kenyah and Iban lineage.
- Tajang Laing - First Kayan Teacher and First Orang Ulu Minister in Sarawak 1970s
- Adrian Jo Milang - practitioner of the ancient Kayan oral art forms Parap and Takna'.
- Hureng Emang - storyteller and matriach from the Tubau Kayan community of Uma Awe.
- Victoria Mujan Nyeigok - entrepreneur and village leader of Apo Kenyiwan in Tubau.
