= Krio Dayak language =

Austronesian language spoken in Kalimantan, Indonesia

Krio Dayak
- Kereho
- Native to: Indonesia
- Region: West Kalimantan
- Native speakers: 500 (2003)
- Language family: Austronesian: Malayo-Polynesian; Kayan–Murik; Müller-Schwaner 'Punan'; Krio Dayak
- Dialects: Seputan

Language codes
- ISO 639-3: xke
- Glottolog: kere1285

Krio Dayak is a Kayan language of the Krio Dayak people in West Kalimantan, Indonesia.

== Vocabulary ==
Krio Dayak language	Banjar language	Meaning
cucul	salukut	burn
julak	julak	eldest uncle or aunt
nongah	angah	middle uncle or aunt
busu'	busu	youngest uncle or aunt
osa	asa	one
dua	dua	two
tiga	talu/tiga	three
ompat	ampat	four
limak	lima	five
anam	anam	six
tujuh	tujuh/pitu	seven
lapatn	lapan/walu	eight
semilatn	sambilan	nine
sapuluh	sapuluh	ten
