= Krio Dayak people =

Krio people Dayak Krio / Kereho
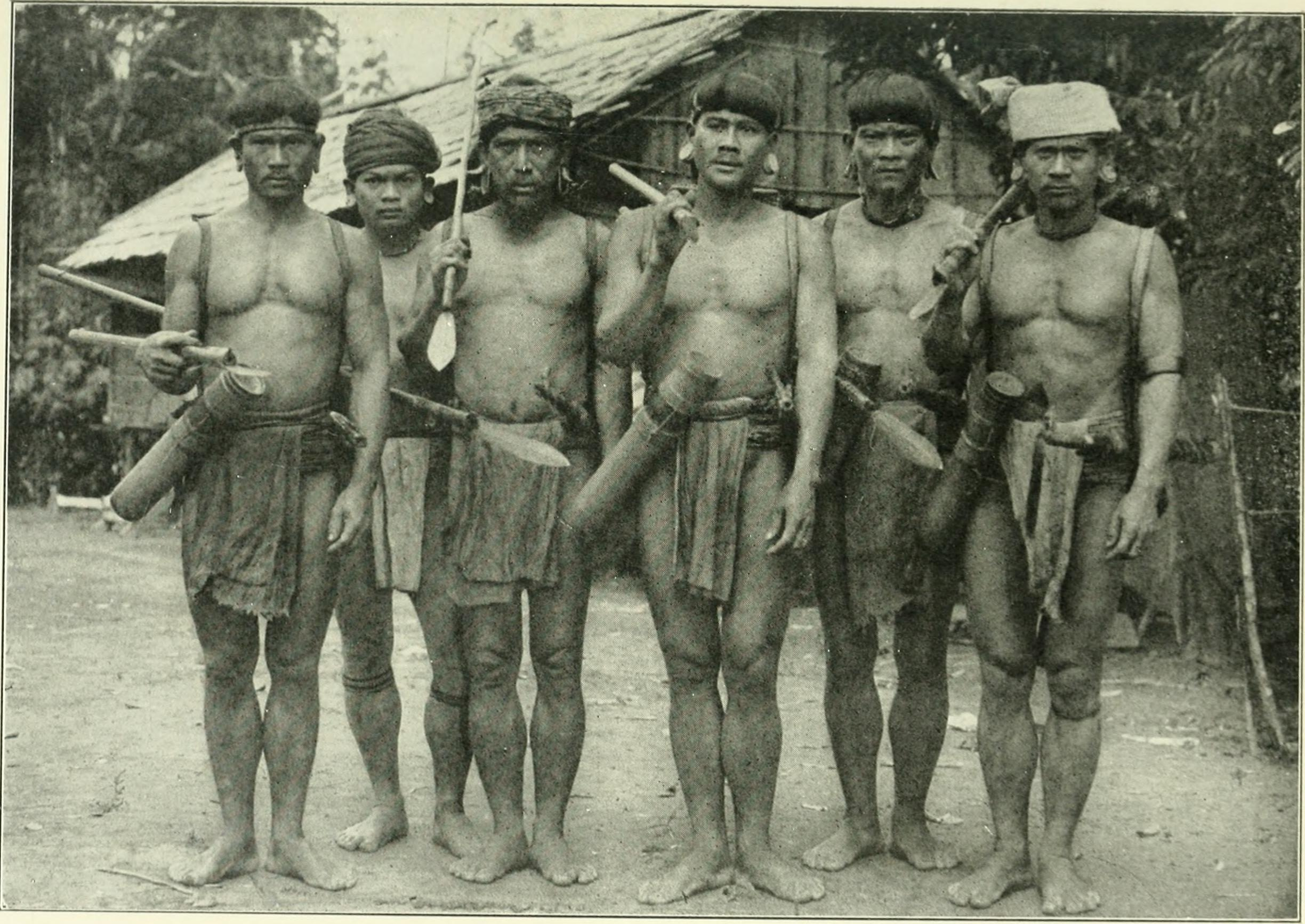
- A group of Penyahbong rhino hunters, 1920.

Regions with significant populations
- Indonesia (West Kalimantan)

Languages
- Krio Dayak language, Indonesian language

Religion
- Kaharingan

Related ethnic groups
- Jalai people

The Krio people (also referred to as Dayak Krio, Dayak Uheng Kereho, Punan Keriau, Dayak Seputan, Oloh Ot Nyawong or Penyahbong) are a Dayak ethnic group in West Kalimantan, Indonesia. They live on the upper course of the Krio River and speak the Krio Dayak language.

== History ==
The Ulu Aik Kingdom was established, by the upper course of the Krio River, around 1700 by Pancur Sembore and Tanjung Porikng. The first leader was pang ukir Empu Geremeng, who was succeeded by Bikukng Tiung. Under Bihukng's leadership, the kingdom was renamed Ulu Aik.

== Traditional Krio song ==
- Pupu' Tagua
- Marau
- Jai Ca' Sampe

== Religion ==
Duwata is the god of the Krio Dayak and the Jelai Dayak.
