= Hudoq =

Indonesian traditional dance

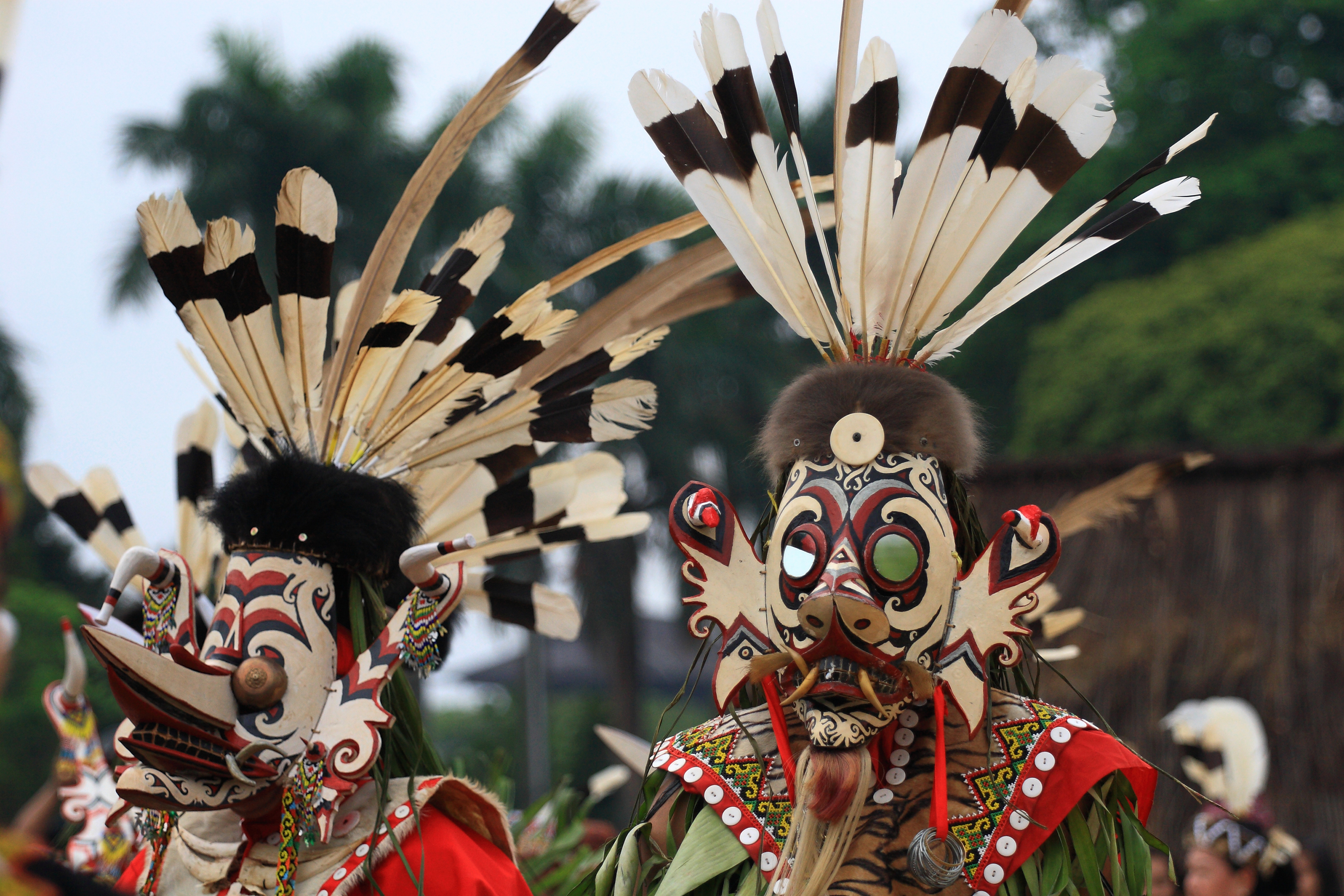
- Native name: Tari Hudoq
- Origin: Indonesia (East Kalimantan)

Hudoq (Indonesian pronunciation: [huˈdɔʔ]) is a masked dance performed during the Erau harvest thanksgiving festival by many of the sub-groups of the Dayak ethnic group in East Kalimantan province, Indonesia. The Hudoq culture and performance are indigenous to the Dayak population of East Kalimantan province, and they are said to have originated from Mahakam Ulu Regency.

== Mythology ==
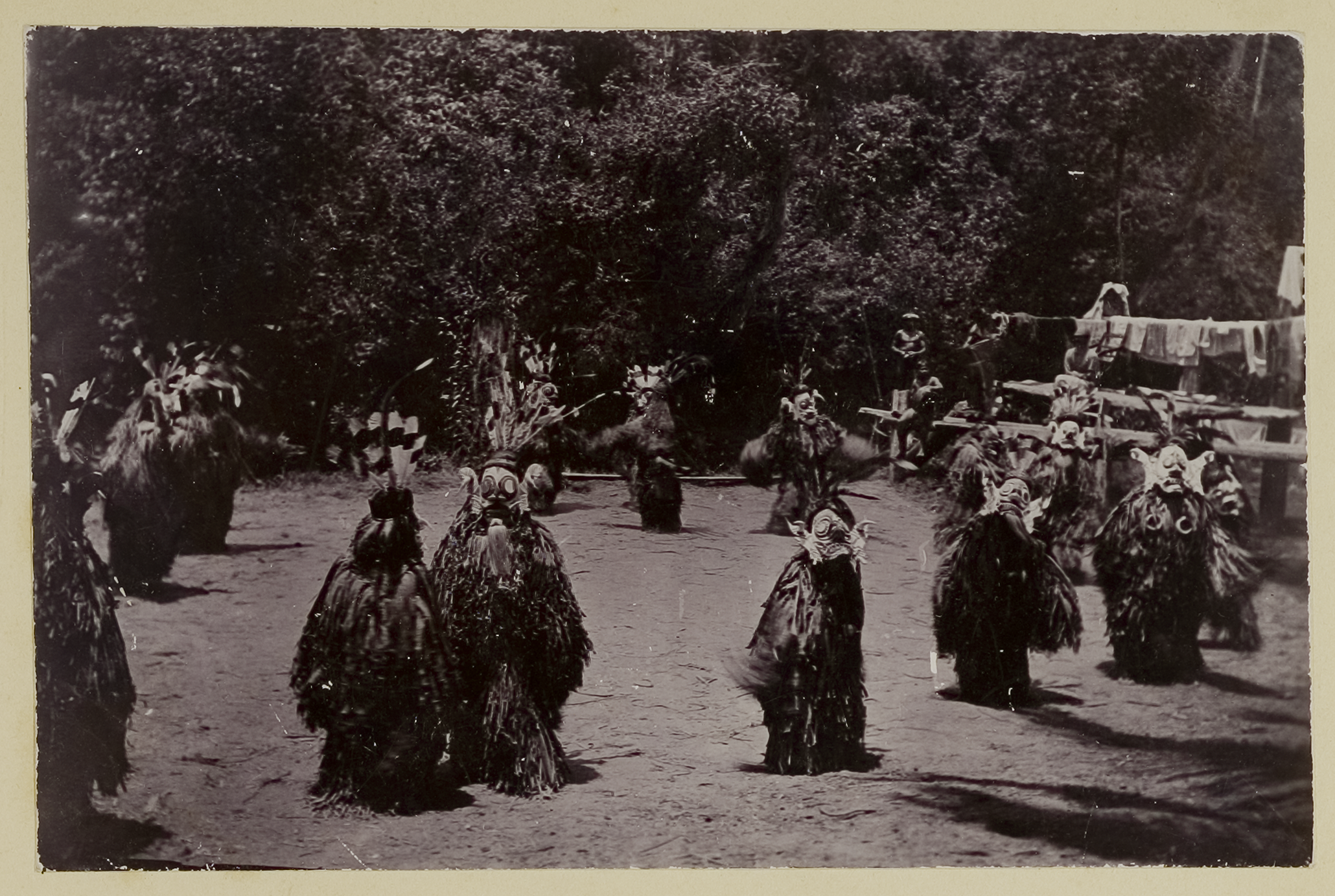
Hudoq performance in Upper Mahakam River, Borneo, Dutch East Indies circa 1896.

According to the traditional beliefs of the Bahau, Busang, Modang, Ao’heng, and Penihing people, hudoqs are thirteen crop-destroying pests, including rats, boars, leopards, and crows. In the festival, the Hudoqs are symbolized by dancers who wear masks representing pests and jackets made of pinang (areca palm) or banana tree bark. The entire body is covered with frayed pinang palm leaves. The dance is finished when two human hudoqs come out and chase the pest hudoqs. The duration of the dance is 1–5 hours.

It is arranged from village to village after people dibble the land to grow dry-field rice paddies in September to October every year. They pray so that their fields will grow abundantly.

== Gallery ==
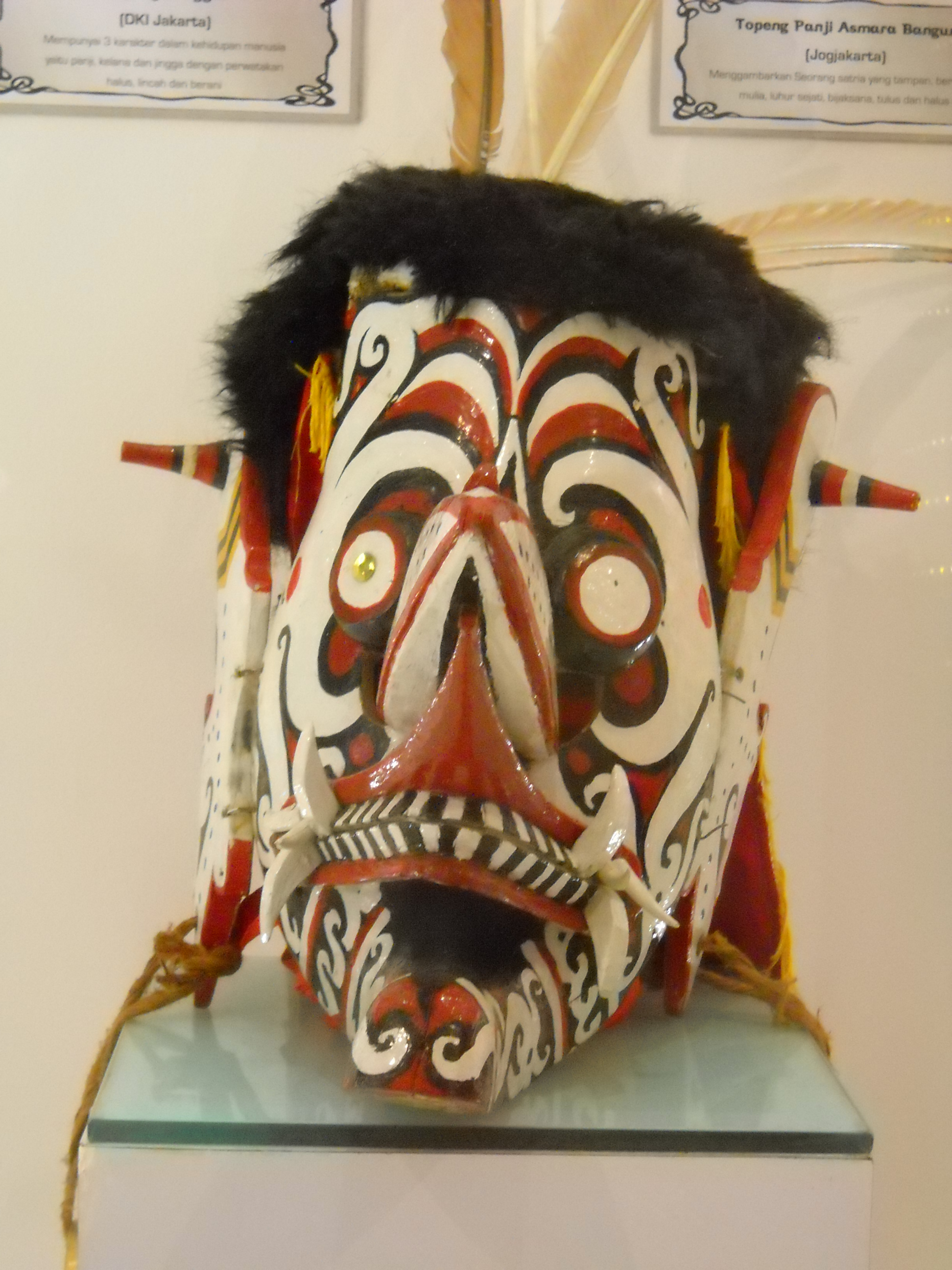

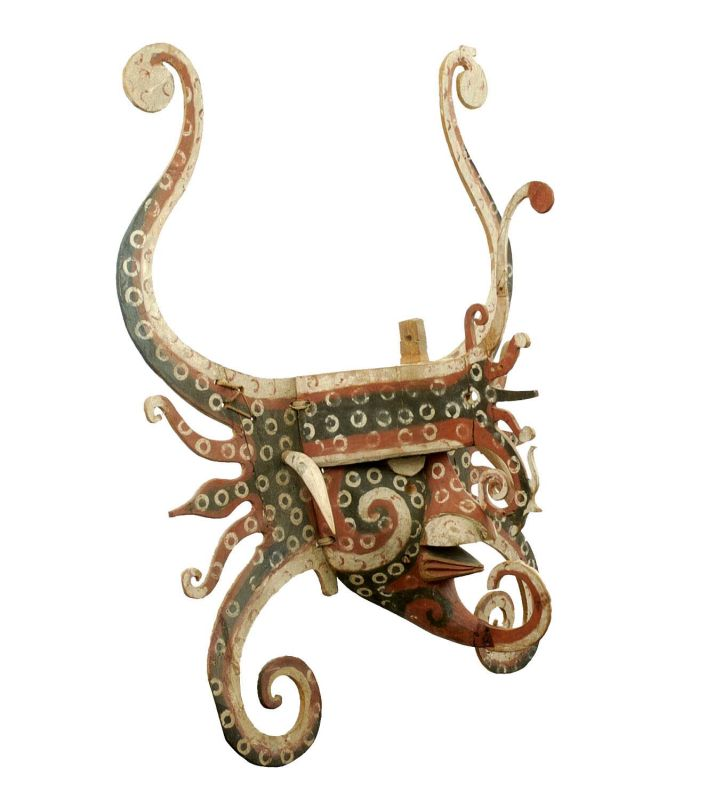

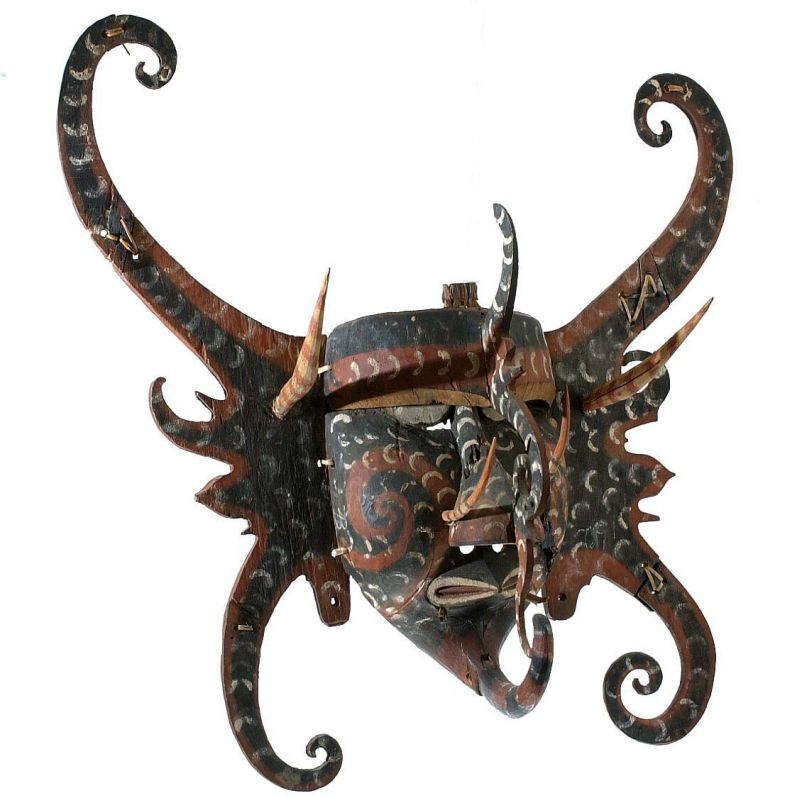

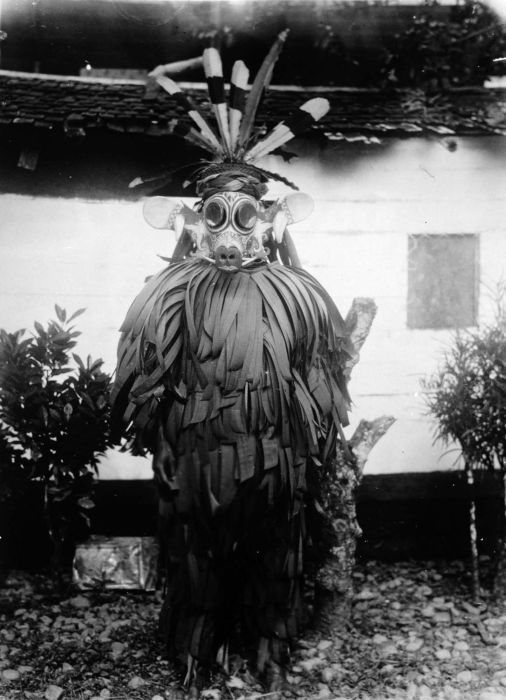

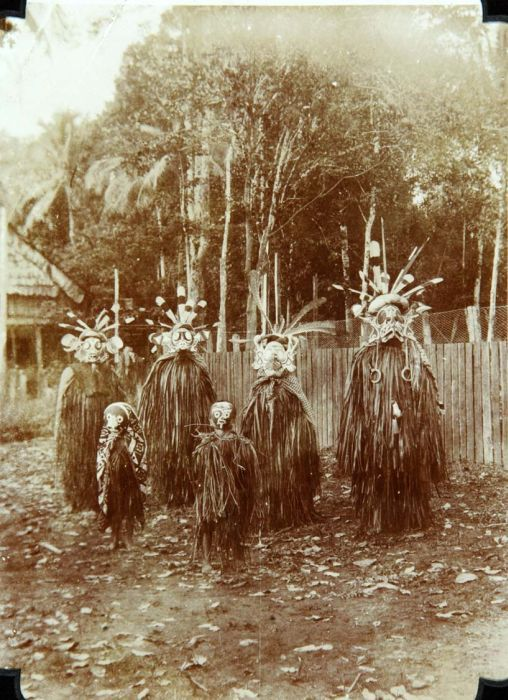

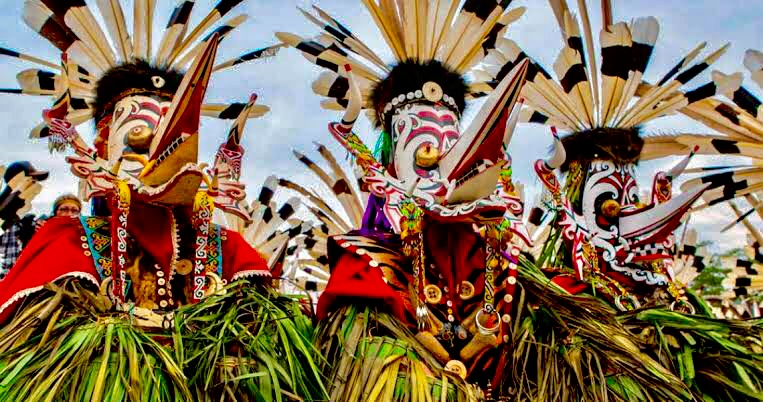

== See also ==
- Kancet Papatai
- Dayak people
- Indonesian Culture
- Ethnic groups in Indonesia
