= Murik Kayan language =

Austronesian language spoken in Sarawak, Malaysia

Murik
- Native to: Malaysia
- Region: Sarawak
- Ethnicity: Kayan
- Native speakers: (1,120 cited 1981)
- Language family: Austronesian: Malayo-Polynesian; Greater North Borneo ?; Kayanic; Kayan–Murik; Murik

Language codes
- ISO 639-3: mxr
- Glottolog: muri1259

Murik is a language of Sarawak, Malaysia.
