= Kayan language (Borneo) =

Austronesian dialect cluster of Southeast Asia

Kayan
- Kajan
- Native to: Indonesia, Malaysia
- Region: Borneo
- Ethnicity: Kayans
- Native speakers: (35,000 cited 1981–2007)
- Language family: Austronesian: Malayo-Polynesian; Greater North Borneo ?; Kayanic; Kayan–Murik; Kayan

Language codes
- ISO 639-3: Variously: xay – Kayan Mahakam kys – Baram Kayan bfg – Busang Kayan xkn – Kayan River Kayan xkd – Mendalam Kayan ree – Rejang Kayan whu – Wahau Kayan bhv – Bahau
- Glottolog: kaya1333 Kayanic

Kayan (Kajan, Kayan proper) is a dialect cluster spoken by the Kayan people of Borneo. It is a cluster of closely related dialects with limited mutual intelligibility, and is itself part of the Kayan-Murik group of Austronesian languages.

Baram Kayan is a local trade language. Bahau is part of the dialect cluster, but is not ethnically Kayan.

== Internal classification ==
Glottolog v4.8 classifies the Kayan dialect cluster as follows:

- Kayan
  - Bahau
  - Baram Kayan
  - Kayan River Kayan
  - Mendalam Kayan
  - Rejan–Makaham Kayan
    - Busang Kayan
    - Kayan Mahakam
    - Rejang Kayan

== Phonology ==
The following is based on the Baram dialect:

=== Consonants ===
		Labial	Alveolar	Palatal	Velar	Glottal
Nasal		m	n	ɲ	ŋ	
Plosive/ Affricate	voiceless	p	t	(tʃ)	k	ʔ
Plosive/ Affricate	tense		tː		kː	
Plosive/ Affricate	voiced	b	d	dʒ	g	
Fricative		β	s	(ʃ)		h
Tap/Trill			r			
Lateral			l			
Approximant		w		j		

- /r/ can be heard as either a tap [ɾ] or a trill [r] in free variation.
- /k/ can be heard as [x] when in free fluctuation with [k] in word-medial position.
- /ɲ, ŋ/ can be realized as more fronted [ɲ̟, ŋ̟] when preceding high vocoids.
- /dʒ/ may also be heard as a palatalized stop [dʲ] in free fluctuation.
- /s/ may also be heard as [ʃ] in free variation, and may also fluctuate to a stop sound [tʃ].

=== Vowels ===
	Front	Central	Back
Close	i		u
Mid	ɛ	ə	ɔ
Open		a	

- Length [Vː] is said to occur in free variation or in word-final position.
- /i/ can be heard as [ɪ] in initial or medial positions, or in free variation with [i].
- /ə/ can also be heard as [ɘ] in word-medial position.
- /a/ can be heard as [ɐ] before a medial or final /ʔ/ or /h/.
- /ɔ/ can be heard as [o] when before a /ʔ/ or /h/, or in fluctuation with [ɔ].
