= Kayan–Murik languages =

Subgroup of the Austronesian language family

Kayan–Murik
- Kayan–Murik–Merap
- Geographic distribution: central Borneo (East Kalimantan, North Kalimantan, Sarawak, and West Kalimantan)
- Linguistic classification: Austronesian: Malayo-Polynesian; Greater North Borneo ?; Kayanic; Kayan–Murik
- Subdivisions: Kayan; Murik

Language codes
- Glottolog: kaya1336

The Kayan–Murik languages are a group of Austronesian languages spoken in Borneo by the Kayan, Murik, and Bahau peoples.

== Languages ==
The Kayan–Murik languages include:

- Kayan proper: Bahau, various languages called Kayan
- Murik

=== Smith (2017, 2019) ===
Smith (2017, 2019) classifies the Kayanic languages as follows:

- Kayanic
  - Kayan–Murik–Merap
    - Kayan
      - Baram
      - Rejang-Busang
      - Bahau
      - Data Dian
    - Murik–Merap
      - Ngorek
      - Pua’
      - Huang Bau
      - Merap

== Notable sound changes ==
=== Glottalisation of final vowels ===
In all Kayan–Murik languages, final vowels *-a, *-i, and *-u are closed with a glottal stop (similar to Banyumasan or Ngapak dialect of Javanese). This process resulted -aʔ, -eʔ, and -oʔ in most languages, but two latter outcomes are instead -ayʔ and -awʔ in Merap.

However, the Kayan–Murik languages have different treatments regarding syllables ending in *-ʔ (inherited from PMP *-q). Data Dian Kayan (DDK) and Bahau lengthen PMP *-aq into -aːʔ (but -iʔ and -uʔ), Busang simply retains the glottal stops without any lengthening, meanwhile, Long Naah Kayan (LNK) and Balui Liko Kayan (BLK) deleted *-q altogether.

=== Final voiced stops ===
Original final voiced stops have been altered to some extent in the Kayan–Murik languages. In LNK and DDK, *-b and *-d became nasalised into -m and -n, respectively (similar to Karo Batak). Meanwhile, in BLK and Busang, both are lenited into -v and -r. However, in Bahau, Ngorek, and Merap, the outcomes of final voiced stops are more variable, with *-b devoiced into -p, but *-d evolved into -l (Bahau), and then nasalised into -n (Ngorek and Merap).

=== Vowel breaking before velar consonants ===
In DDK, BLK, and additionally Uma Juman Kayan (UJK), vowels *a and *i were broken into eə and iə, before velar consonants *k or *ŋ (*anak 'child' → aneək).

=== Outcomes of *z and *s ===
In Bahau, PMP *s was debuccalised to h in all positions (eventually merging with the outcome of PMP *ʀ), while *z chain shifted to s. In other languages, *s was only debuccalised in initial, or final position; therefore, it is still retained in the medial position (merging with medial *-z-). Meanwhile, initial *z- became j- instead in these languages. However, in BLK and Busang, *-s was further deleted in the final position, but this rule did not apply for *-ʀ, nor the sequence *əs in Busang. Because of this, Alexander D. Smith speculates that the Proto-Kayanic outcome for PMP *z is *c, while *s remains unchanged.

PMP	→	Daughter
*pusuʔ 'heart'	→	Bahau puhuʔ
*uzan 'rain'	→	Bahau usan
*bətis 'calf'	→	Busang bəti
*hapəjəs 'smarting pain'	→	Busang pərah
*qitəluʀ 'egg'	→	Busang təloh

=== Sequences of nasals and voiced consonants ===
In most Kayan–Murik languages, such sequences (*mb, *nd, *nj, *ŋg) have evolved into *b, *d, *j, *g, by deleting the homorganic nasals. This change followed the lenition of medial *-b- and *-d- into -v- (-f- in DDK and Bahau) and -r- in Kayan languages. However, in Murik and Merap, they merged with *mp, *nt, *nc, *ŋk, with devoiced plosives.
