= Rumah Kulit =

- Location within Borneo
- Coordinates: 2.15°N 114.23333°E
- Country: Malaysia
- State: Sarawak
- Administrative Division: Belaga
- Elevation: 397 m (1,302 ft)

Rumah Kulit is a settlement in the Belaga division of Sarawak, Malaysia. It lies approximately 438.4 kilometres (272 mi) east of the state capital Kuching.

Neighbouring settlements include:

- Rumah Baka 22.2 kilometres (13.8 mi) west
- Rumah Balui Ukap 42.3 kilometres (26.3 mi) northwest
- Rumah Ukit 44.8 kilometres (27.8 mi) northwest
- Long Geng 53.1 kilometres (33.0 mi) north
- Rumah Daro 54.7 kilometres (34.0 mi) northwest
- Rumah Belayang 65.1 kilometres (40.5 mi) west
- Rumah Dampa 65.3 kilometres (40.6 mi) southwest
- Rumah Ugil 67.5 kilometres (41.9 mi) west
- Rumah Suntong 67.5 kilometres (41.9 mi) west
