= Rumah Baka =

- Location within Borneo
- Coordinates: 2.15°N 114.03333°E
- Country: Malaysia
- State: Sarawak
- Administrative Division: Belaga
- Elevation: 479 m (1,572 ft)

Rumah Baka is a settlement in the Belaga division of Sarawak, Malaysia. It lies approximately 416.4 kilometres (259 mi) east of the state capital Kuching.

Neighbouring settlements include:

- Rumah Kulit 22.2 kilometres (13.8 mi) east
- Rumah Balui Ukap 25.2 kilometres (15.7 mi) northwest
- Rumah Ukit 27.8 kilometres (17.3 mi) northwest
- Rumah Daro 36.7 kilometres (22.8 mi) northwest
- Rumah Belayang 44.8 kilometres (27.8 mi) southwest
- Rumah Ugil 47.4 kilometres (29.5 mi) southwest
- Rumah Suntong 47.4 kilometres (29.5 mi) southwest
- Rumah Dampa 48.7 kilometres (30.3 mi) southwest
- Rumah Temong Jugah 49.4 kilometres (30.7 mi) southwest
- Rumah Dampa 49.9 kilometres (31.0 mi) southwest
