= Miri =

City in Sarawak, Malaysia

- City and district capital
- City of Miri Bandaraya Miri (Malay)
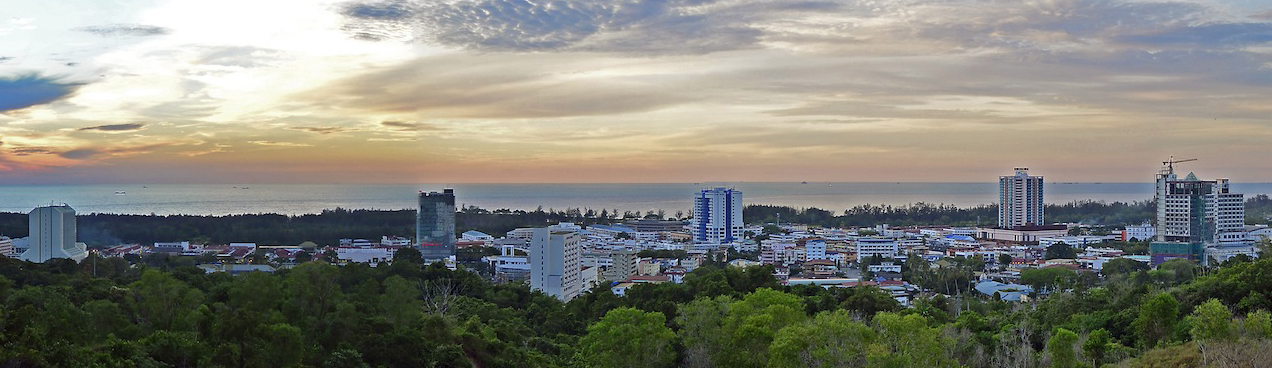
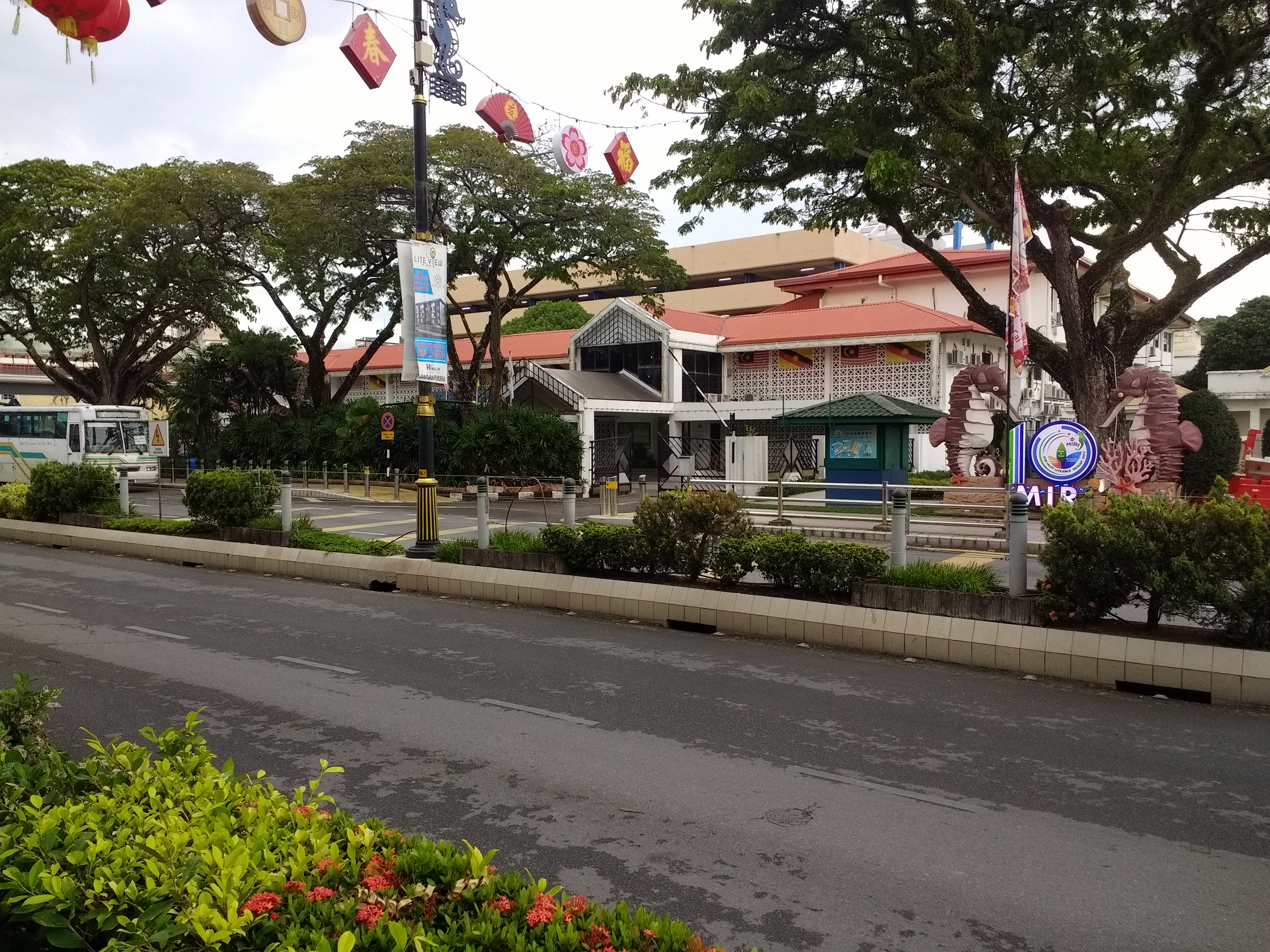
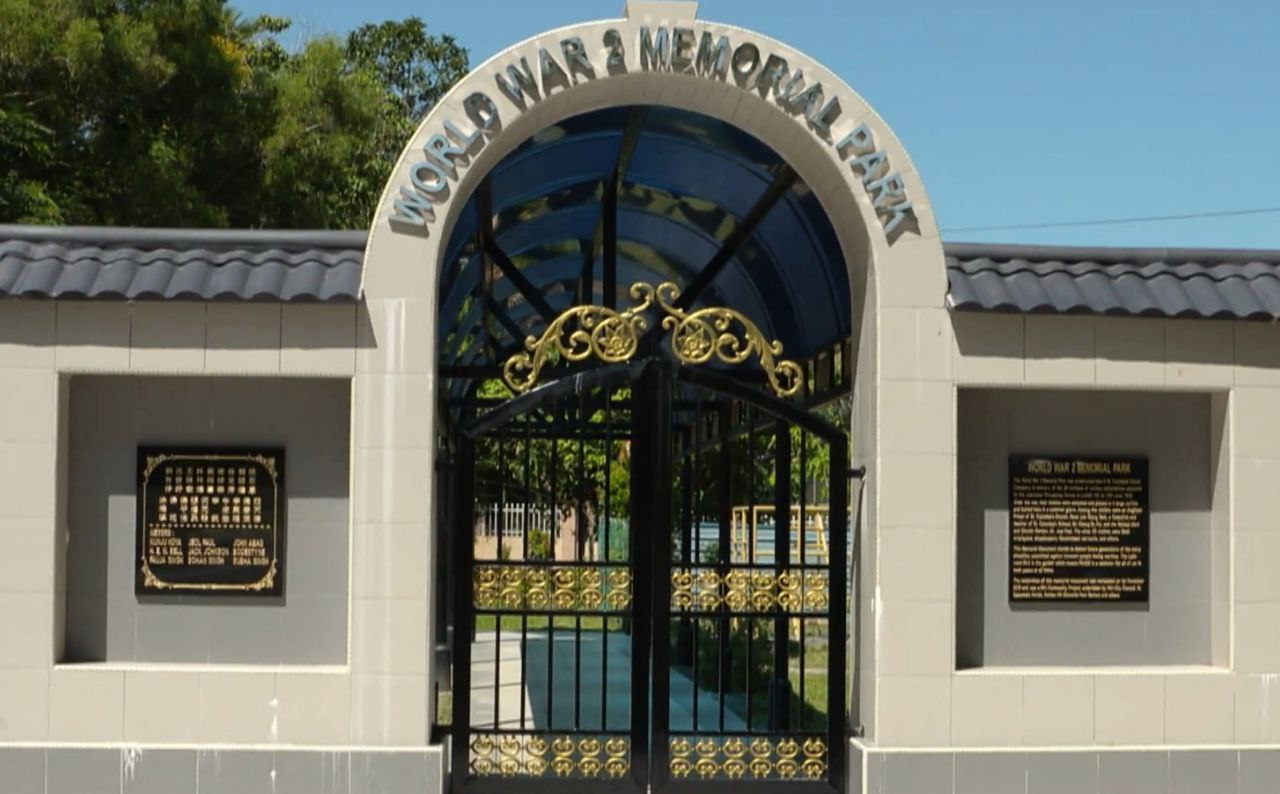
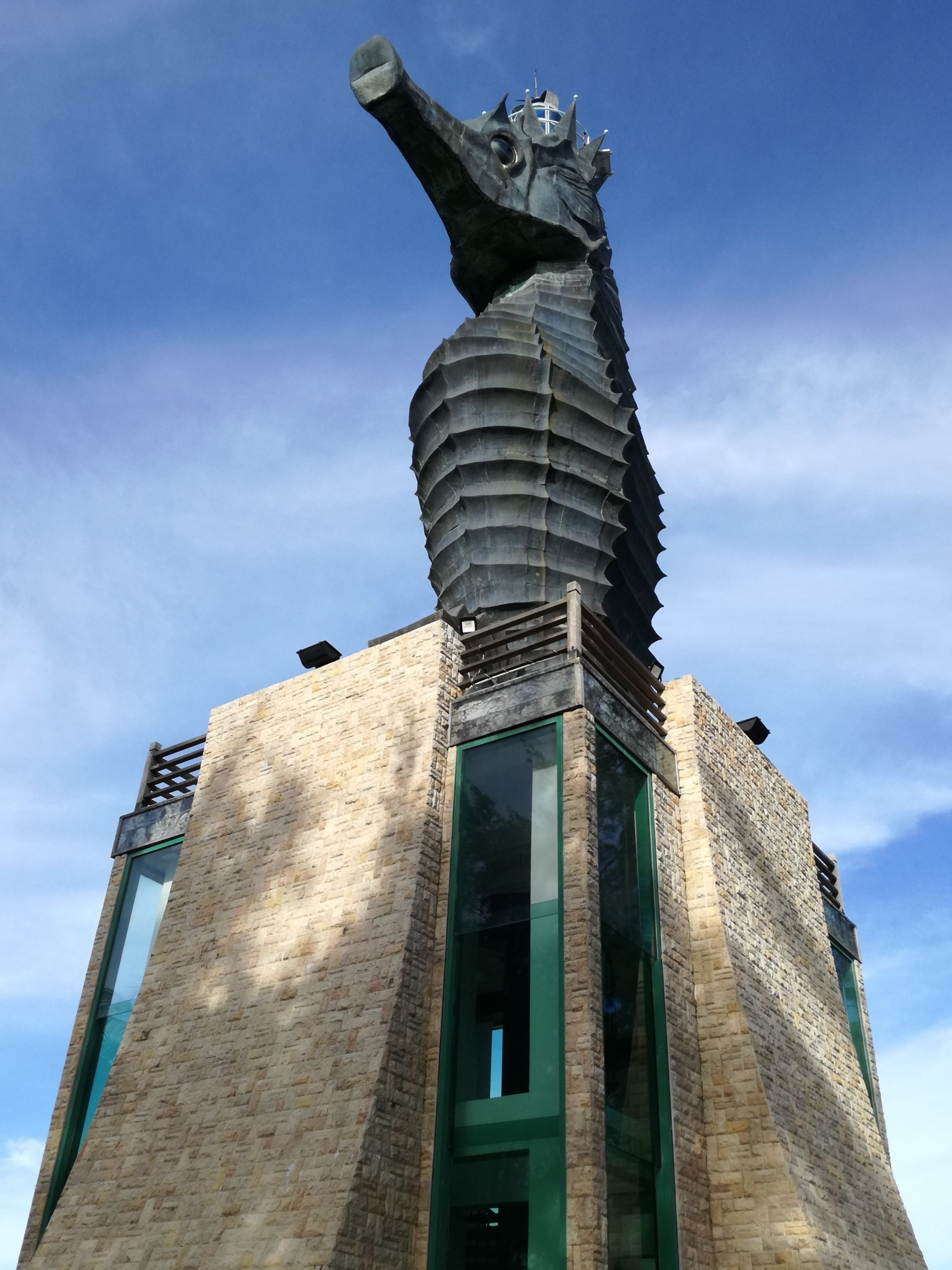
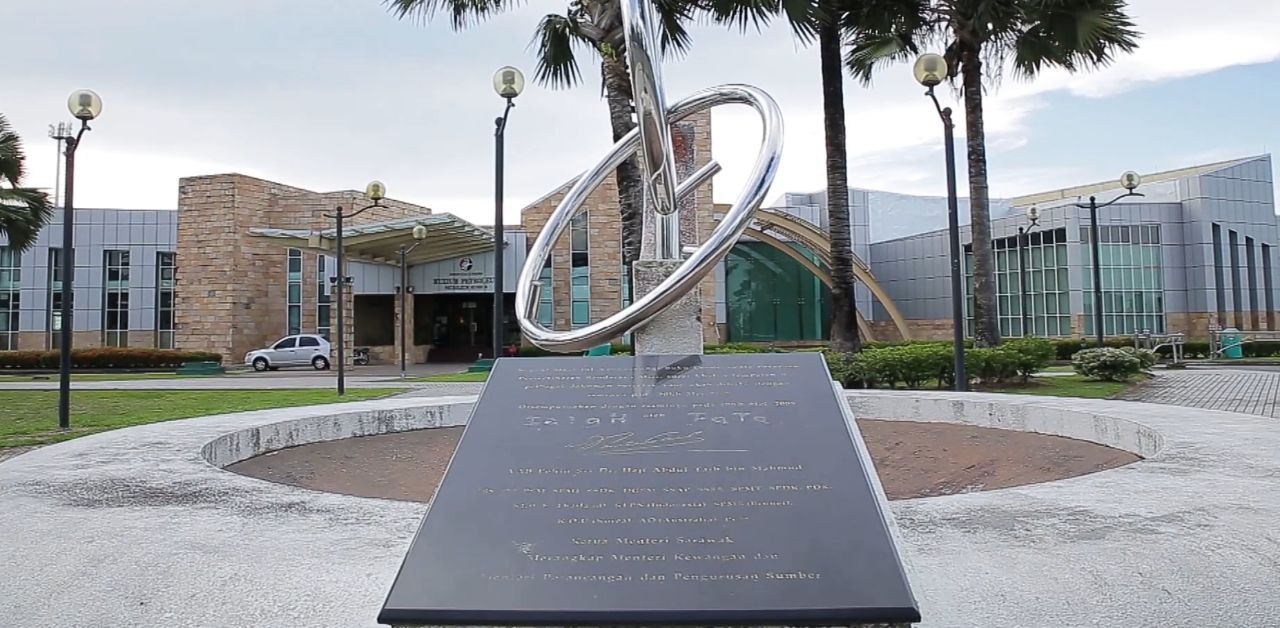
- From top, left to right: Miri City lookout from Canada Hill, the old Miri City Council Complex, Miri World War 2 Memorial Park, the Iconic Seahorse Lighthouse, and Miri Petroleum Museum.

- Seal
- Nicknames: "Resort City" (Bandaraya Peranginan), "Oil Town" (Bandar Minyak)
- Motto: Maju Bersama Masyarakat (English: Progress with the Society)
- Interactive map of Miri
- Miri in Sarawak Miri (Malaysia) Miri (Asia) Miri (Earth)
- Coordinates: 04°23′33″N 113°59′10″E
- Country: Malaysia
- State: Sarawak
- Division: Miri
- District: Miri
- Founded by Royal Dutch Shell: 10 August 1910
- Granted municipality status: 6 November 1981
- Granted city status: 20 May 2005

Government
  - Type: City council
  - Body: Miri City Council
  - Mayor: Adam Yii Siew Sang

Area
  - Miri City: 997.43 km^{2} (385.11 sq mi)
- Elevation: 8 m (26 ft)
- Lowest elevation: 0 m (0 ft)

Population ((as per administrative district; 2022))
  - Miri City: 248,877
  - Demonym: Mirian
- Time zone: UTC+08:00 (MST)
  - Summer (DST): UTC+08:00 (Not observed)
- Postal code: 98xxx
- Area code(s): +6085 (landline only)
- Vehicle registration: QM and QM****A (etc..) (for all vehicles except taxis); HQ (for taxis only)
- Website: www.miricouncil.gov.my

Miri (/ˈmiri/) is a coastal city in north-eastern Sarawak, Malaysia, located near the border of Brunei, on the island of Borneo. The city covers an area of 997.43 square kilometres (385.11 sq mi), located 798 kilometres (496 mi) northeast of Kuching and 329 kilometres (204 mi) southwest of Kota Kinabalu. Miri is the second largest city in Sarawak, with a population of 356,900 as of 2020. The city is also the capital of Miri District, Miri Division.

Before Miri was founded, Marudi was the administrative centre of the northern region of Sarawak. Miri was founded in 1910 when the first oil well was drilled by Royal Dutch Shell. The discovery of an oil field in Miri has led to rapid development of Miri town. Miri became the administrative centre of the northern region of Sarawak by 1929. During World War II, the Miri oil fields were destroyed by the Brooke government to sabotage Japanese operations in Southeast Asia but to no avail; Miri town was the first landing point of Japanese troops in Borneo. The subsequent Japanese occupation led Miri to become a target of Allied air raids which caused the destruction of oil refinery facilities in Miri. The petroleum industry continued to be a major player in the city's economy after the war. Oil exploration has moved offshore since the 1950s, but subsequently new inland oil fields were found in 1989 and 2011. In 1974, the formation of Malaysian oil and gas company Petronas led to co-operation between Petronas and Shell on oil exploration in the Miri region. In 2005, Miri became the 10th city in Malaysia to be granted official city status, the first non-state-capital city to be bestowed such status. To commemorate the occasion, the Miri City Fan was created. The 26 acre urban civic park includes a promenade, parkland, Amphitheatre, musical fountain, library and cultural centre. The Miri City Fan was masterplanned by Teo A. Khing Design Consultants (TAK).

Miri is the main tourist gateway to the world-famous UNESCO World Heritage Site, Gunung Mulu National Park; Loagan Bunut National Park; Lambir Hills National Park; and Niah National Park and Miri-Sibuti Coral Reef National Park. The Gunung Mulu National Park with its Sarawak Chamber, which is the largest known cave chamber in the world by area, remains one of the favourite ecotourism destinations in Miri. Miri is also the birthplace of the Malaysian petroleum industry. Other major industries in the city include timber, oil palm and tourism.

== Etymology ==
Miri town is named after a minority ethnic group called "Jati Miriek" or simply "Mirek", or "Miriek". This ethnic group are the earliest settlers in the region of Miri Division. Europeans who later came to the region for oil exploration mistakenly pronounced "Miriek" as "Miri", and this name continues to be used today.

== Prehistory ==
Niah man and contemporary cultures c. 50,000~32,000

The first foragers visited the West Mouth of Niah Cave – located 110 km (68 mi) southwest of Miri city – 50,000 years ago when Borneo was connected to the mainland of Southeast Asia. The landscape of Niah Cave was drier and more open than it is now. Prehistoric Niah Cave was surrounded by a mosaic of closed forests with bush, parkland, swamps, and rivers. The foragers were able to survive in the rainforests through hunting, fishing, mollusc collection, and plant gathering. The earliest evidence of human population in the area dates back to 40,000 BC in Niah Cave at Paleolithic period. This is evidenced by the discovery of a Homo sapiens skull nicknamed "Deep Skull" in a deep trench uncovered by Tom Harrisson in 1958, which is the oldest modern human skull in Southeast Asia. The skull probably belongs to a 16- to 17-year-old adolescent girl. Unfossilised Manis paleojavanica (Asian giant pangolin) bone dated back to 30,000 BC was also found in the proximity of the "Deep Skull", as well as with the Mesolithic and Neolithic burial sites inside the Niah Caves.

== History ==
=== Brooke administration ===
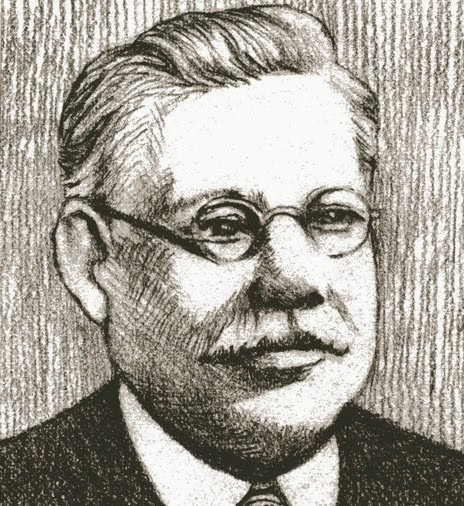
Charles Hose advocated Miri oil exploration to Royal Dutch Shell.

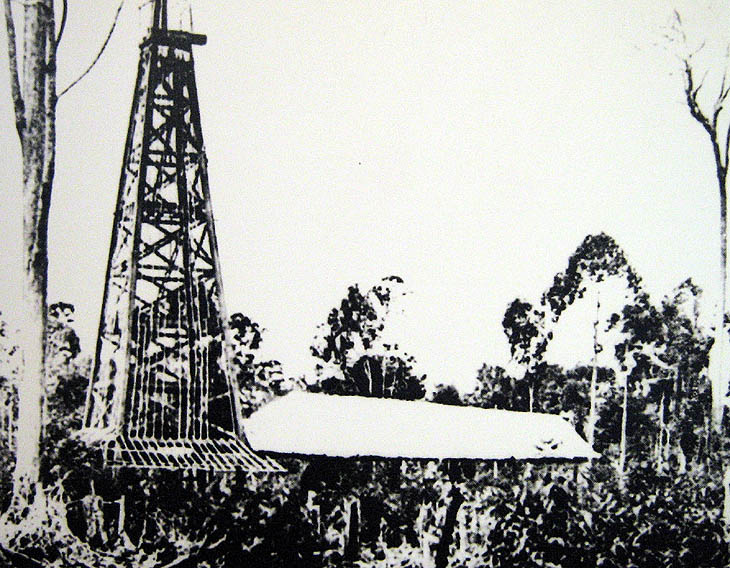
Miri Well No. 1 in 1910

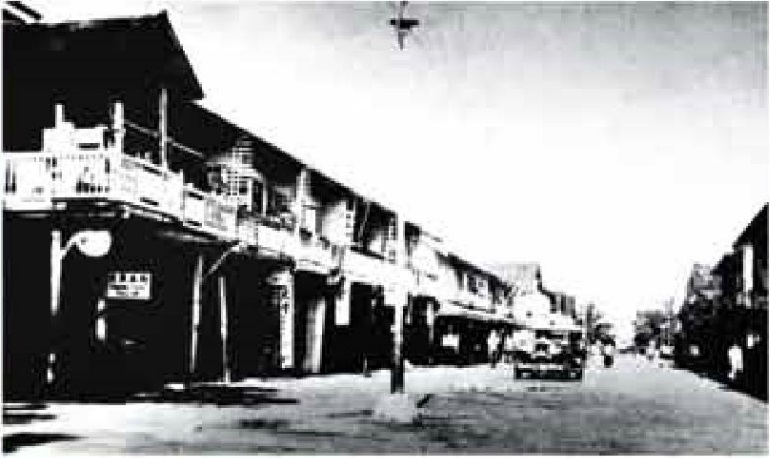
Miri street view in 1925

Charles Brooke succeeded James Brooke as the new Rajah of Sarawak in 1868. By 1883, Sultan of Brunei (Sultan Abdul Momin) ceded the Baram region (including Miri) to Charles Brooke. The fourth division of Sarawak was immediately created with the installation of Claude Champion de Crespigny as the first Resident of the Division. The Miri area was still a fishing village at that time. It was a small settlement surrounded by mangrove and Nipah palm jungles consisted of 20 scattered houses, a few wooden shops operated by Chinese traders and a lone Arab trader. A fort was built in Claudetown (present day Marudi, 43 km or 27 mi to the east of Miri) in 1883. Claudetown became the administrative centre of the division. Mr Claude's administration was helped by two junior officers, 30 rangers, and a few native police. Charles Hose succeeded Mr de Crespigny as the new Resident in 1891 and the fort in Marudi was renamed as "Fort Hose". To restore peace among various ethnic tribes fighting in the Baram region, Charles Hose decided to organise a peace conference at his fort in April 1899. This peace conference also led to the birth of first Baram Regatta, a long boat race competition among the natives which continued to be held until today.

The local population in Miri has indeed started to extract oil from hand-dug wells for centuries. Song Huiyao Jigao, a documentation of the Song dynasty of China, mentions the imports of Borneo camphor and petroleum in the 11th century. In 1882, Mr de Crespigny reported to the Brooke government on 18 hand-dug oil wells in the Miri area. He also recommended that area near Miri River should be thoroughly explored. However, his recommendations were ignored. But when Charles Hose took over the Resident office in 1891, he was interested in Mr de Crespigny's idea and began to collaborate with him. Mr de Crespigny began to map oil seeps around the Miri area, however a consultant geologist from England discouraged the oil exploration in Miri due to poor logistical conditions. After his retirement from administrative positions in Sarawak, Charles Hose went back to England. He later went to London to discuss the idea of oil exploration in Miri with the Anglo-Saxon Petroleum Company (later became a part of Royal Dutch Shell Company in 1907). H. N. Benjamin, a branch manager from the petroleum company, was interested in this idea. Finally in 1909, Rajah Charles Brooke came to London to sign the first Sarawak Oil Mining Lease. Royal Dutch Shell dispatched a senior geologist named Josef Theodor Erb together with Charles Hose back to Miri. Erb started to map Miri oil fields from August 1909 to July 1910. He also identified a location known as "Miri Hill" (now known as "Canada Hill", 150 m (490 ft) above sea level) is suitable to act as an anticline for oil drilling.

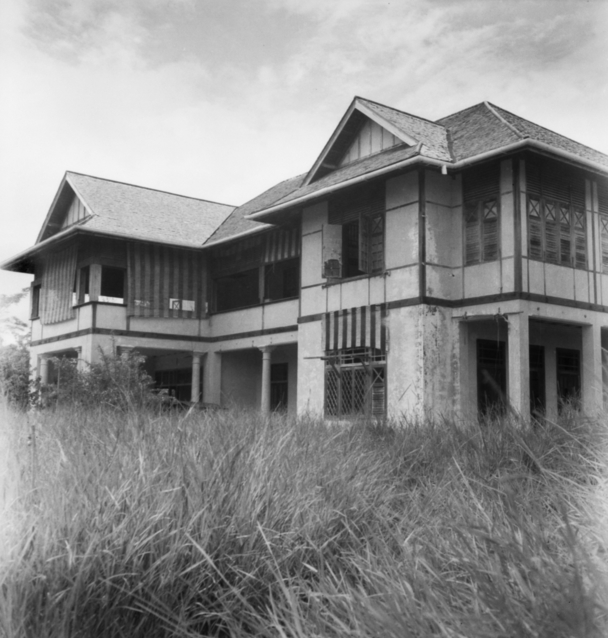
The Residency Building in Miri was originally used as an administration building for the British before being turned into Japanese headquarters during their occupation in Miri.

Finally, on 10 August 1910, the first oil drilling operation was started. A 30-metre-high (98 ft) rig (nicknamed the "Grand Old Lady") made up of wooden derricks and cable tool drilling was used in the operation by Royal Dutch Shell. On 22 December 1910, oil was struck after 130 metres (430 ft) of drilling at the well. Royal Dutch Shell also founded a subsidiary company named Sarawak Oil Field Ltd, which now operated as Sarawak Shell Berhad. Since then, another 624 land wells have been drilled around Miri until 1972 which are collectively known as the "Miri field". The Miri field is the only onshore field in Sarawak, because oil production has shifted offshore since the late 1950s. The first oil well on Canada Hill (Miri Well No. 1) produced a total of 0.65 million barrels (103,000 m^{3}) for the next 60 years until its closure on 31 October 1972. The first oil refinery and submarine pipeline was built in Miri in 1914. The oil refinery has since been relocated to Lutong, 11 km (6.8 mi) to the north of Miri, in 1916.

Resident Office moved from Marudi to Miri in 1912. Miri grew as fast as the rate of oil production by the Shell company. In 1920, roads were built in Miri. Bicycles and motorcycles were also bought into the town. By 1921, there were 40 shop houses in Miri, with one English school and one Chinese school. Motor cars were later introduced to the town. In 1924, Pujut Road was built to link Miri with Lutong. By 1925, rotary drilling was introduced. Oil production continued to increase until it reached a peak of 15,211 barrels (2,418.4 m^{3}) per day in 1929. Water supply were improved, jungles were cleared, and more roads were built. Miri became the administrative centre of the entire Baram region in 1929.

=== Japanese occupation ===
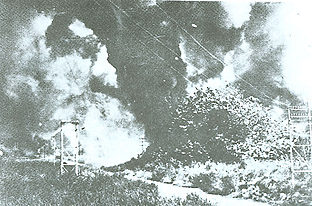
The Brooke government destroyed Lutong oil refinery and storage facilities before the arrival of the Japanese.

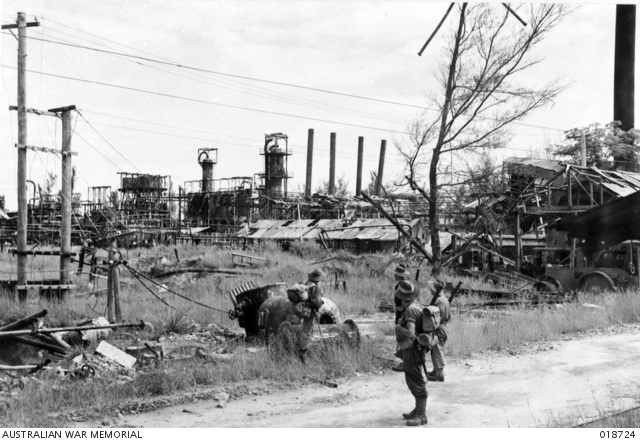
Damaged oil refinery installations at Lutong in 1945 due to Allied bombings

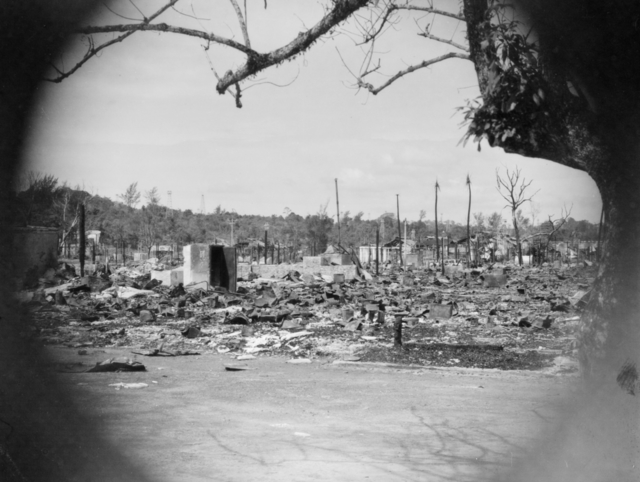
Impact from Allied bombardment on the town

The Brooke government had been actively lobbying for the British government to accept Sarawak as one of its protectorates in an event of a war. By 1888, the British finally agreed to grant the protection to Sarawak. The British dispatched several troops to Sarawak to strengthen its defences in the 1930s. By 1938, under the leadership of Rajah Charles Vyner Brooke, airstrips were constructed in Miri, Kuching, Oya, and Mukah in preparation for an imminent war. However, by 1941, British Royal Navy and Royal Air Force had withdrawn from Sarawak and returned to Singapore. Therefore, the British government advocated a "scorched earth policy" for the Brooke government in the event of a Japanese attack. A Denial Scheme was formulated to destroy oil installations in Miri and Lutong. This was because the coastline measuring 48 kilometres (30 mi) from Lutong to Miri was impossible to defend from Japanese landings due to shortage of manpower. By May 1941, 1 Infantry Company from 2/15 Punjab Regiment, 6-inch Hong Kong-Singapore Royal Artillery Battery, and 1 Platoon of Royal Engineers were stationed at Miri to oversee the destruction of the Miri oil fields. In August 1941, an operation was carried out to reduce Miri oil output by 70%.

Soon after the news of Japanese attack on Pearl Harbor, Japanese planes were seen making reconnaissance flights over Miri. The Brooke government decided on a complete destruction of oilfields and airfields in Miri. Shell company officials received orders to carry out the Denial Scheme on 8 December 1941. In the evening on the same day, the task was completed. All producing oil wells were sealed up with vital equipment and machinery dismantled and shipped off to Singapore. Skilled workers and important company papers also went along with the equipment and sent to Singapore. The Punjab Regiment and several officials were sent to guard Kuching. On 16 December 1941, 9 days after the Pearl Harbor bombing, Japanese troops consisting of 10,000 men landed on Tanjung Lobang Beach, Miri without much resistance. However, on 17 December 1941, a Dutch flying boat from Tarakan Island attacked the Japanese destroyer Shinonome (under the command of Hiroshi Sasagawa) off Miri. The ship was sunk along with the entire crew of 228. Another flying boat X-33 also damaged a Japanese transport ship. After the fall of Singapore on 15 January 1942, skilled workers that went into hiding with their equipment were sent back to Miri by the Japanese. They were immediately put to work for Japanese oil supply service company named Nen Ryo Hai Kyu. Much of the Japanese oil drilling and refinery equipment was portable. A total of 0.75 million barrels (119,000 m^{3}) were produced during the Japanese occupation from 1941 to 1945.

During the occupation, Miri and Lutong became a periodic subject of Allied air raids and bombings. Food, clothes, and medicine were scarce. Workers of the Japanese oil supply service were used to reconstruct and maintain Lutong Bridge and Lutong airstrip from Allied bombing damage.

=== Recent developments ===
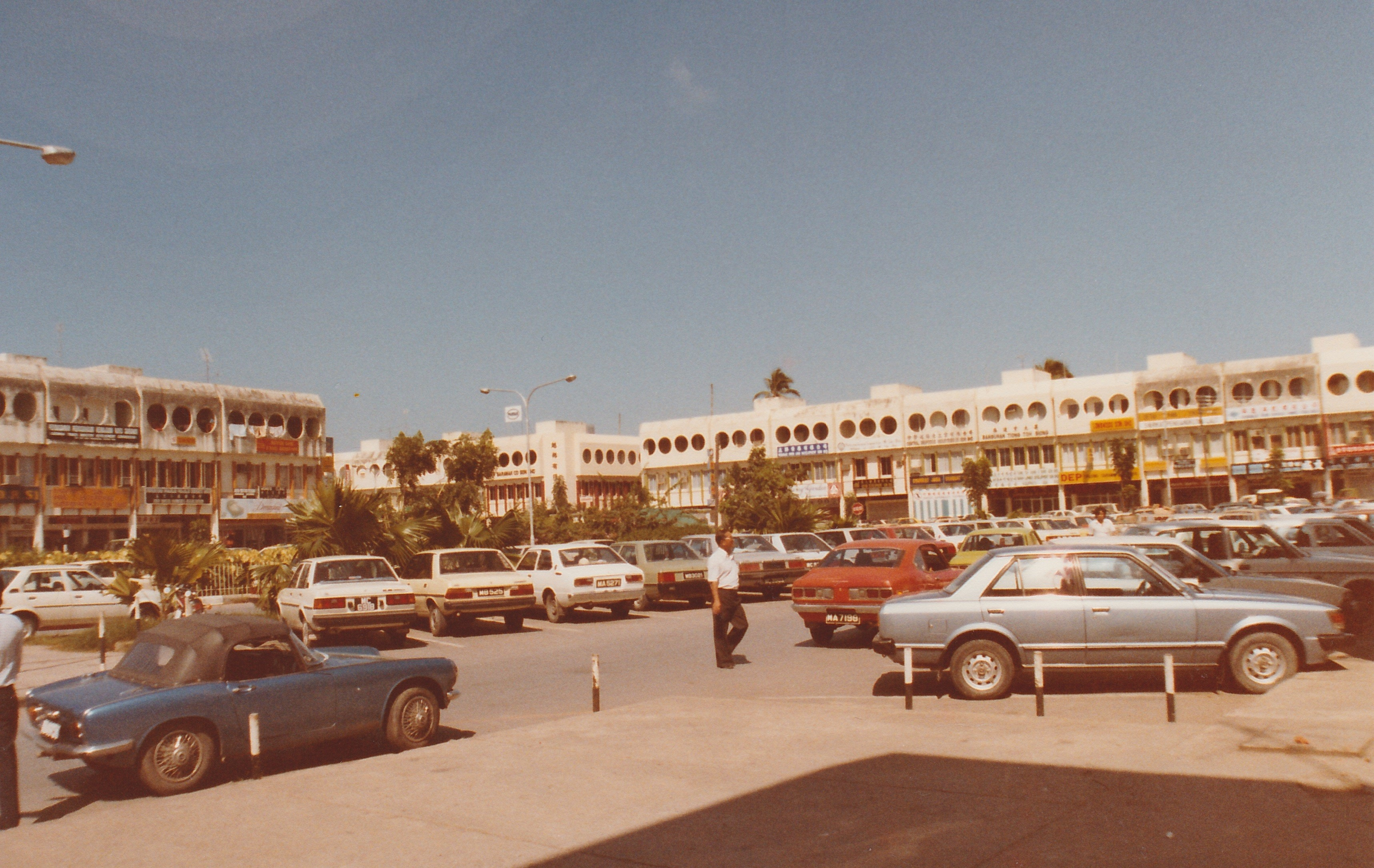
Miri town in 1983

Petronas, a Malaysian national oil and gas company, was formed in 1974. As a result, a concession system was changed into production sharing contract system (PSC) between Shell and Petronas. All the foreign oil companies including Shell required to obtain licences from Petronas. The first two PSCs were signed on 30 November 1976. Foreign oil companies are required to keep not more than 41% of the oil produced until their original costs are recovered. After a return of their investments, the oil companies will keep 30% of the revenue after all operating costs and oil royalties are deducted. Petronas also formed a company named Petronas Carigali Sdn Bhd which was directly involved in the exploration, development, and production of oil and gas in the country. Petronas also initiated the Baram Delta Gas Gathering (Bardegg) project which involves the collection and compression of gas from five fields, namely Betty, Bekor, Baram, Baronia, and West Lutong, located 10 to 45 km (6 to 28 mi) offshore from Miri. This is to ensure the minimisation of gas loss during oil production. Petronas and Shell are also involved in educational outreach activities such as awarding scholarships to deserving students. Both companies are also involved in Malaysian first rig-to-reef project, in an effort to preserve bio-marine life in the sea offshore Miri. In this project, an abandoned offshore platform was made to become part of the Siwa reef. Both companies also started to establish Piasau Nature Reserve in 2014.

Miri Municipal Council has adopted the seahorse as the town's official symbol. It was proposed by the former Sarawak chief minister Abdul Taib Mahmud and introduced as part of the "I love Miri campaign" in 1994. The seahorse is chosen because of its distinctive figure with gentle and graceful motion. These characteristics describe multiple ethnic and cultural identities of Miri which live in peace and harmony with good values of life. It also denotes the location of Miri town near to the sea and coral reefs and the city status as a resort paradise.

Miri was elevated to city status on 20 May 2005 and became Malaysia's tenth city. Miri is also the first town in Malaysia which is not a state capital to be granted city status. Miri City Day is celebrated each year on 20 May since it was declared by the past Chief Minister, Abdul Taib Mahmud. A time capsule containing news article of the day and a souvenir book was buried at Petroleum Science Museum at Canada Hill, Miri. The time capsule will be opened 100 years later on 20 May 2105. An effort has also been made to develop Miri as liveable resort city.

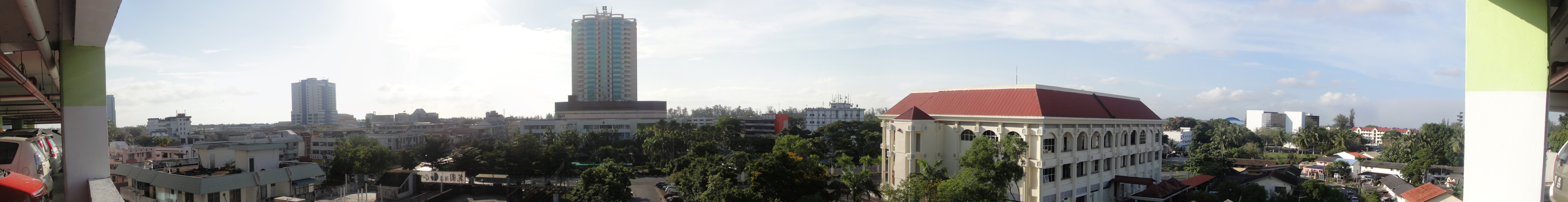
View of Miri from Bintang Megamall.

== Governance ==
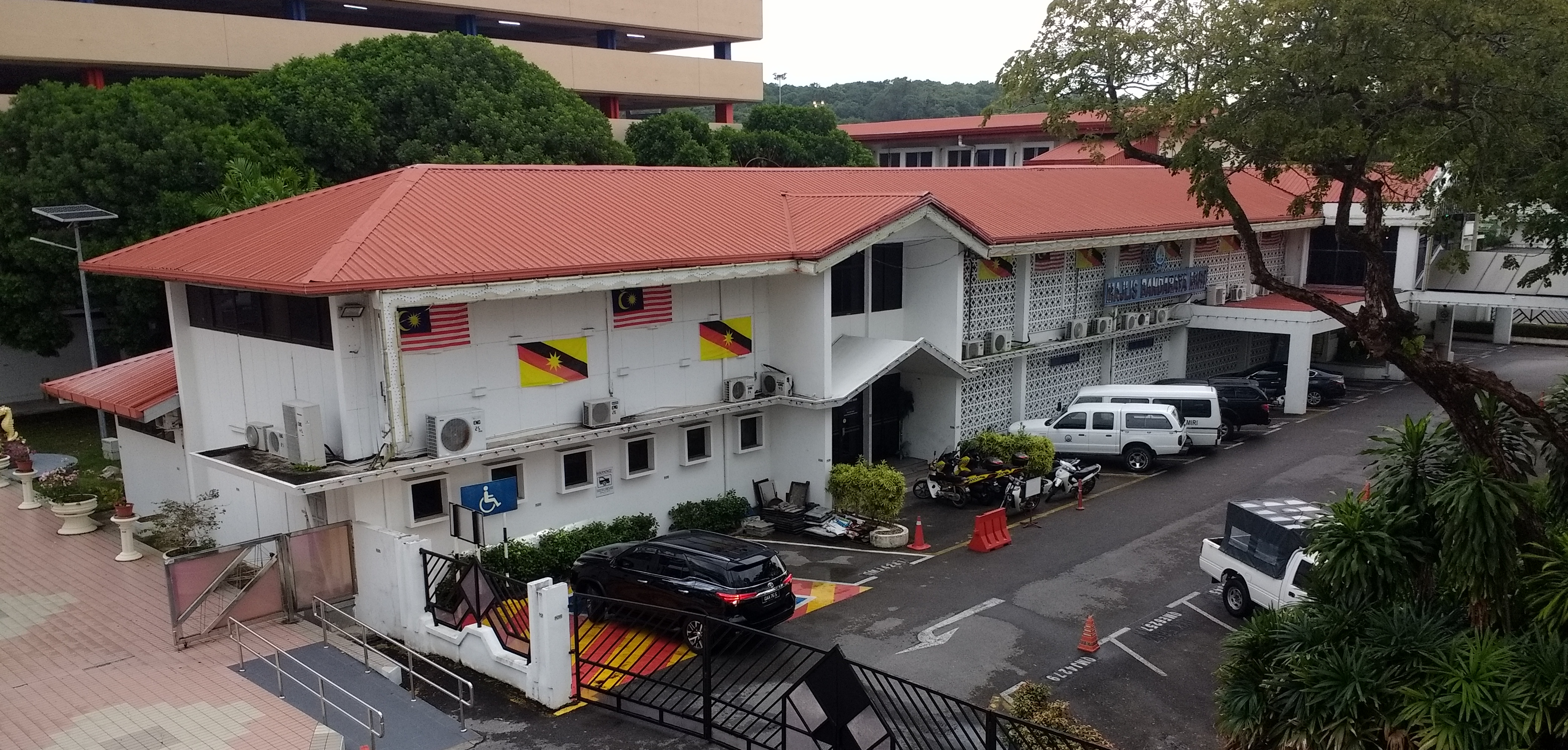
The Miri City Council building.

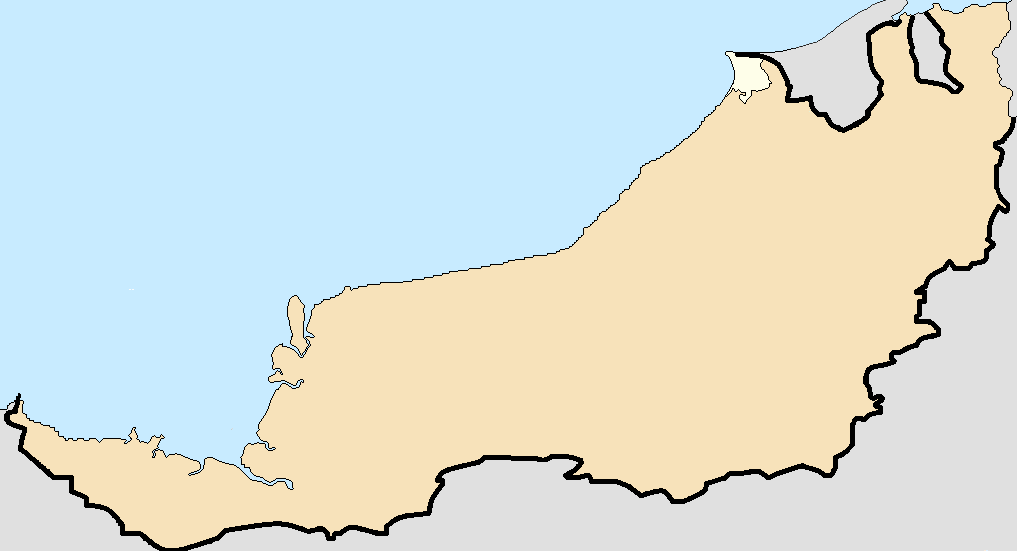
Locations of Miri and its suburbs

Miri City currently elects one member of parliament from the Miri parliamentary seat (P.219) into the Parliament of Malaysia. The city also elects 3 state assemblymen into the Sarawak State Legislative Assembly, namely Piasau, Pujut, and Senadin.

=== Local authority and city definition ===
Miri was formerly administered by the Miri Municipal Council for 24 years. It was upgraded to Miri City Council (MCC) on 20 May 2005, with Adam Yii Siew Sang as its current mayor, headquartered at Kinsgway Road, Miri. Area under the jurisdiction of MCC is 977.43 km^{2} (377.39 sq mi). Miri lies within the boundary of the Miri District, which consists of Miri City, Sibuti sub-district, and Niah sub-district, with a total population of 290,274 and total area of 4,707 km^{2} (1,817 sq mi). Miri Resident Office and Miri District Office are located at Kingsway Road, Miri City.

== Geography ==
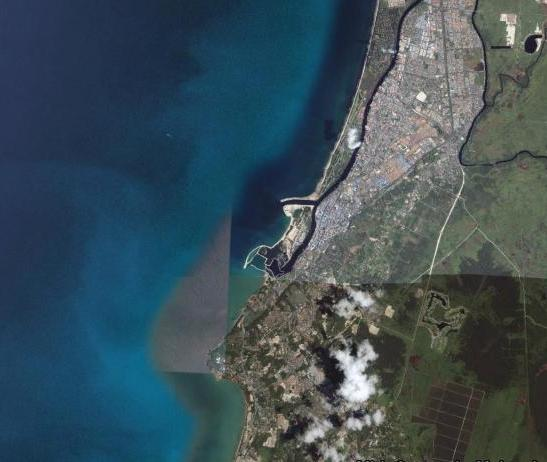
Miri City as seen from satellite image

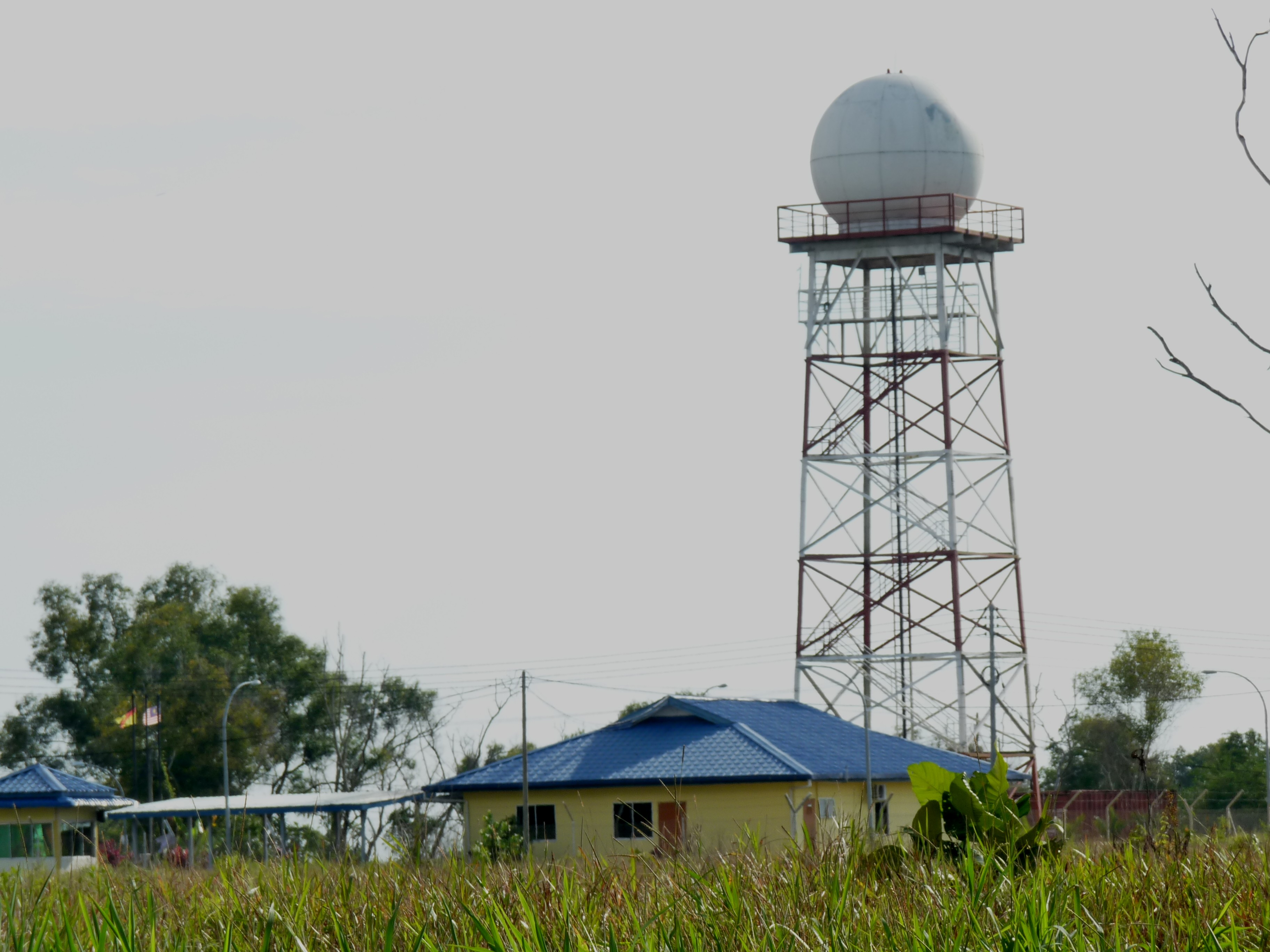
Weather radar station on Canada Hill in Miri

Miri is situated on the alluvial plain of the Miri River on the western shore of northern Sarawak on the island of Borneo. Because of the prevailing southerly off-shore current, beach drift has built up the Peninsula Road as a barrier beach between the Miri River and the shore causing a "Yazoo effect" where the river runs parallel to the coast before breaking through into the South China Sea. The city is predominately located on the inland (east) side of the Miri River with only a few scattered residential neighbourhoods, a Golf Club and a small airstrip on the Peninsula Road.

=== Climate ===
Miri has a tropical rainforest climate. There are two monsoon seasons: the southwest monsoon, which is the dry season from April to September, and the northeast monsoon, which is the wet season from October to March. The annual rainfall is around 250 to 380 cm (98 to 150 in). The air temperature is between 23 °C (73 °F) to 32 °C (90 °F) the whole year round. But on rare occasions, the temperature can go down to 16 °C (61 °F) to 18 °C (64 °F) especially in the months of November, December and January. The lowest temperature ever recorded was in December 2010 when the mercury dropped down to 11 °C (52 °F).

Climate data for Miri (1991–2020 normals, extremes 1940–present)
| Month | Jan | Feb | Mar | Apr | May | Jun | Jul | Aug | Sep | Oct | Nov | Dec | Year |
|---|---|---|---|---|---|---|---|---|---|---|---|---|---|
| Record high °C (°F) | 33.9 (93.0) | 34.0 (93.2) | 35.4 (95.7) | 35.5 (95.9) | 35.8 (96.4) | 35.9 (96.6) | 35.0 (95.0) | 35.5 (95.9) | 35.7 (96.3) | 34.8 (94.6) | 34.2 (93.6) | 35.0 (95.0) | 35.9 (96.6) |
| Mean daily maximum °C (°F) | 30.5 (86.9) | 30.6 (87.1) | 31.2 (88.2) | 31.6 (88.9) | 31.8 (89.2) | 31.7 (89.1) | 31.5 (88.7) | 31.6 (88.9) | 31.4 (88.5) | 31.0 (87.8) | 30.9 (87.6) | 30.7 (87.3) | 31.2 (88.2) |
| Daily mean °C (°F) | 26.4 (79.5) | 26.5 (79.7) | 27.0 (80.6) | 27.5 (81.5) | 27.7 (81.9) | 27.5 (81.5) | 27.3 (81.1) | 27.4 (81.3) | 27.3 (81.1) | 27.0 (80.6) | 26.9 (80.4) | 26.7 (80.1) | 27.1 (80.8) |
| Mean daily minimum °C (°F) | 23.6 (74.5) | 23.7 (74.7) | 23.9 (75.0) | 24.2 (75.6) | 24.4 (75.9) | 24.1 (75.4) | 23.8 (74.8) | 23.9 (75.0) | 23.9 (75.0) | 23.8 (74.8) | 23.9 (75.0) | 23.8 (74.8) | 23.9 (75.0) |
| Record low °C (°F) | 19.5 (67.1) | 19.4 (66.9) | 20.4 (68.7) | 20.6 (69.1) | 21.7 (71.1) | 20.6 (69.1) | 21.1 (70.0) | 21.1 (70.0) | 21.0 (69.8) | 21.1 (70.0) | 21.4 (70.5) | 20.0 (68.0) | 19.4 (66.9) |
| Average precipitation mm (inches) | 295.3 (11.63) | 155.5 (6.12) | 158.8 (6.25) | 173.4 (6.83) | 208.1 (8.19) | 212.8 (8.38) | 198.6 (7.82) | 219.3 (8.63) | 218.5 (8.60) | 305.4 (12.02) | 295.4 (11.63) | 367.9 (14.48) | 2,809 (110.59) |
| Average precipitation days (≥ 1.0 mm) | 14.5 | 9.6 | 10.2 | 12.4 | 13.0 | 11.4 | 11.6 | 11.7 | 13.1 | 16.2 | 16.4 | 17.6 | 157.7 |
| Average relative humidity (%) (at 14:00) | 76 | 78 | 77 | 74 | 74 | 73 | 72 | 73 | 73 | 75 | 76 | 76 | 75 |
| Mean monthly sunshine hours | 170.3 | 172.1 | 201.8 | 216.5 | 220.0 | 205.6 | 213.3 | 202.3 | 184.6 | 184.4 | 189.0 | 185.4 | 2,345.3 |
Source 1: World Meteorological Organization
Source 2: NOAA (sun 1961–1990), Deutscher Wetterdienst (humidity)

== Demography ==
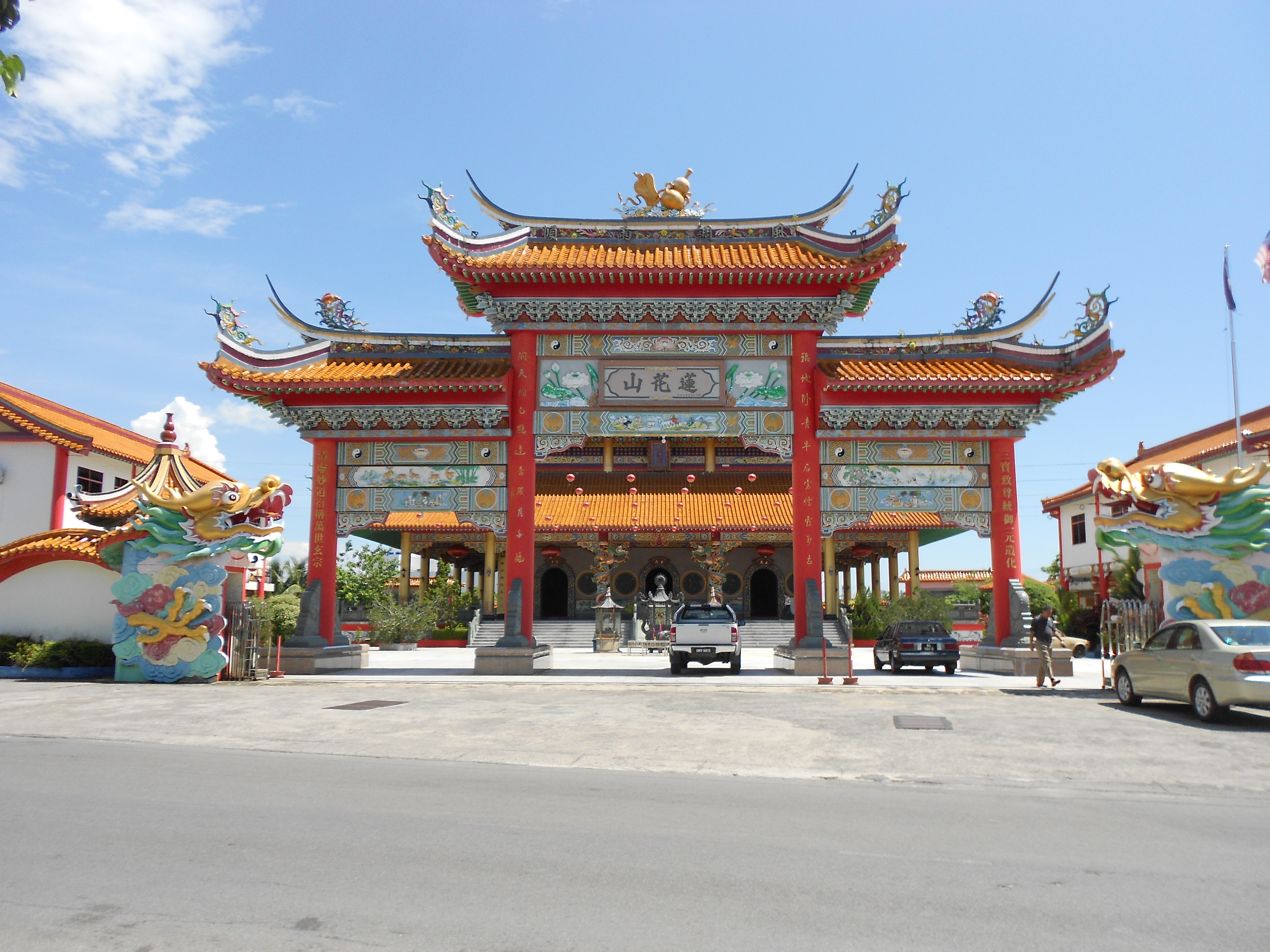
San Ching Tian Temple

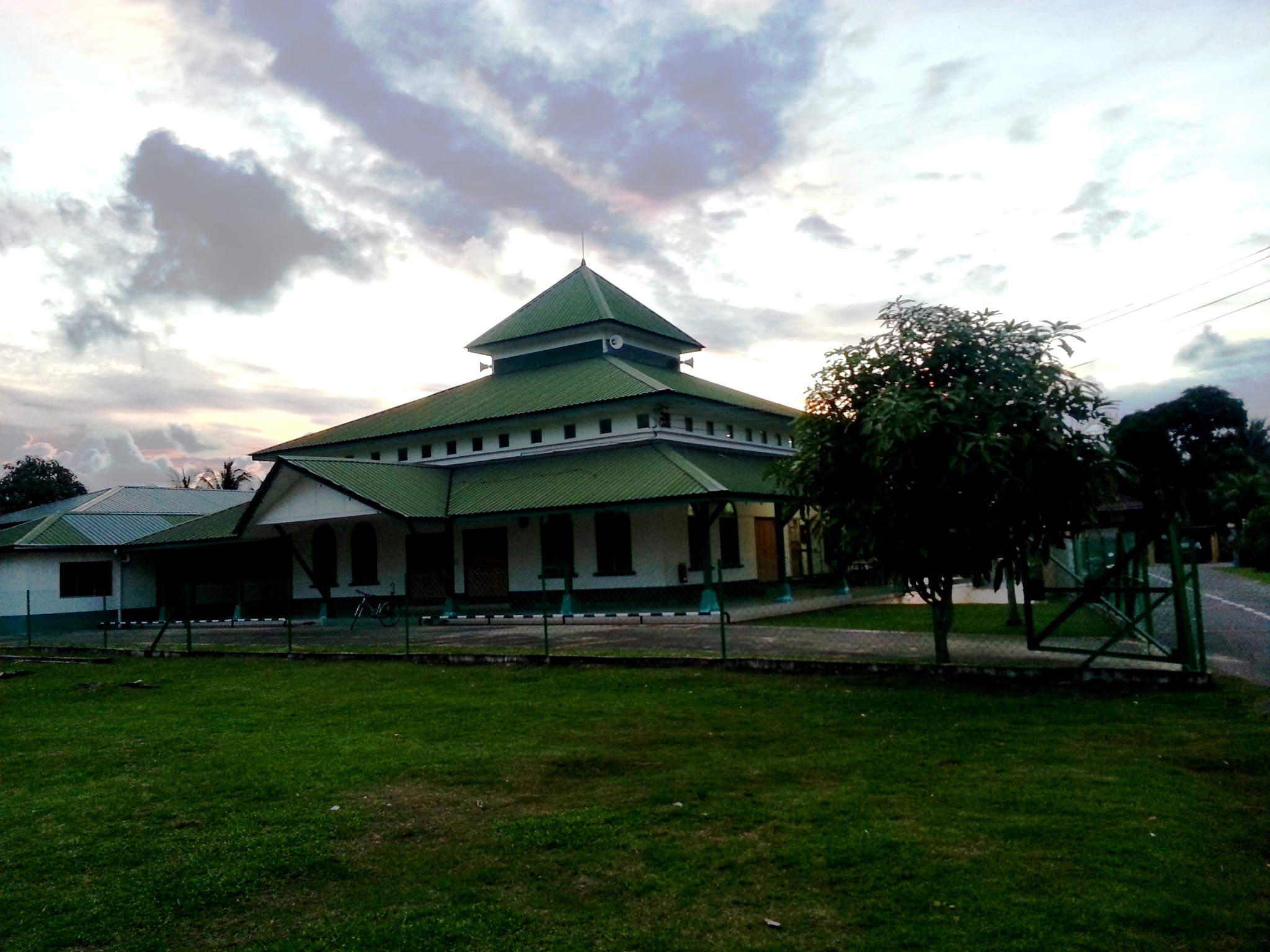
Nur Hijrah Mosque

People from Miri are called "Mirians".

The growth of Miri population is shown below:

Historical population

| Year | Pop. | ±% p.a. |
|---|---|---|
| 1940 | 11,000 | — |
| 1960 | 24,049 | +3.99% |
| 1970 | 34,613 | +3.71% |
| 1980 | 52,125 | +4.18% |

| Year | Pop. | ±% p.a. |
|---|---|---|
| 1991 | 102,878 | +6.38% |
| 2000 | 167,535 | +5.57% |
| 2010 | 234,541 | +3.42% |
| 2020 | 248,877 | +0.60% |

=== Ethnicity ===
Miri District Ethnic Statistic
| Total Population | Malay | Iban | Bidayuh | Melanau | Other Bumiputera | Chinese | Indian | Other Non-Bumiputera | Non-Citizen |
|---|---|---|---|---|---|---|---|---|---|
| 356,900 (as per Administrative District year 2020) | 52,954 | 85,026 | 3,727 | 9,012 | 31,704 | 77,869 | 1,186 | 1,609 | 27,187 |

Ethnic composition in Miri
| Ethnic group | Percent |
| Iban | 29.2% |
| Chinese | 26.8% |
| Malay | 18.24% |
| Other Bumiputera | 10.9% |
| Non-Citizen | 9.3% |
| Melanau | 3.1% |
| Others | 2.2% |

According to the 2010 Malaysian census, Miri City has a total population of 234,541. Indigenous people form the largest ethnic group in the city (61.3%, 143,736) which consists of Iban (61,273), Malay (46,723), other indigenous tribes (24,119), Melanau (8,313), and Bidayuh (3,308). This is followed by Chinese (32.1%, 75,329), non-Malaysians (5.7%, 13,362), Indians (0.5%, 1134), and Others (0.4%, 980). The ethnic Malay population here consists mainly of Bruneian, Jati Miriek (early indigenous native inhabitants) and Kedayan peoples. Miri has 19 out of 27 Sarawak ethnic groups, including Orang Ulu tribal groups native to the area such as Berawan, Kiput, Lun Bawang, Kayan, Bakong, Kenyah and Kelabit people. Chinese in Miri mainly consist of the Fuzhounese majority with significant populations of Hakka and Cantonese including a small number of Teochews and Hainanese. A majority of non-Malaysians in Miri are Bajau people from the working at Baram Delta as fishermen. There are also illegal Suluk and Bajau people entering Miri using Pulau Tikus (near Baram Delta) as a transit point.

=== Languages ===
There is great diversity in terms of languages spoken in Miri, as it is a location where there are migrants from all over Sarawak, some West Malaysians, several foreigners, and several Eurasians. Among the main languages spoken here are Malay: which includes both the local variety of Malay, Sarawakian Malay or Bahasa Sarawak, and Standard Malay; Malaysian Mandarin, and Iban. The pronunciation and accent of spoken Malay differs depending on each individual's native language, background and history. English is generally well spoken by the older generation, many of whom received primary and secondary education in the 1960s, which then, was in English: a token of British colonialism; or who have worked in oil & gas related companies that operate in English, where they picked up English, Malay and Iban to varying levels of mastery. This is not the case for many younger Mirians, who generally were and are being educated in either Malay or Mandarin; most are capable of speaking basic English with grammar that is heavily influenced by either Malay or Mandarin. This, is because the English language was reduced to a mere standalone subject after the 1980s. There is currently a minuscule minority of Miri-born Millennials and Generation Z members that speaks English as its first language, with varying levels of proficiency. The indigenous races speak their various languages as well, all of them Austronesian. These include languages such as Berawan, Lakiput (often called Kiput), Bruneian/Kedayan, Miriek, Iban, Bidayuh, Kayan, Kenyah, Lun Bawang and Kelabit. Meanwhile, the Chinese Malaysians speak Malaysian Mandarin, Hakka, Cantonese, Teochew, Hainanese, Hokkien and Foochow, in addition to possibly Henghua, a minority Chinese language in Malaysia. However, many Millennials and Generation Z members in Miri tend to use the lingua francas Malay and Malaysian Mandarin rather than their indigenous languages (such as Kayan and Kelabit) and Chinese dialects (Hokkien and Foochow); with the exception of Iban, which is widely used here; although certain efforts have been made in the past to promote the usage of indigenous languages among the younger generation.

=== Religion ===
Religions in Miri include Christianity, Islam, Buddhism, Taoism, Hinduism, Sikhism and Baháʼí Faith. Among the Christian churches, there are the Borneo Evangelical Church, Anglicanism, Methodism, Roman Catholics. Respective religious groups are free to hold processions in Miri city. Among notable religious places in Miri are: Tua Pek Kong Temple, Che Sing Khor Moral Uplifting Society, Lian Hua San Ching Tian Temple (莲花山三清殿, Taoist temple), St Joseph Cathedral (Roman Catholic), Hwai En Methodist Church, St Columba church (Anglican), Al-Taqwa Mosque, Al-Jamek Mosque, Sikh Temple, and Kamini Durga Eswari Amman Temple (Hinduism). Sarawak is predominantly Christian, in contrast with most of the Indonesian archipelago This is also owing to the 2 previous Christian Revivals: the Bario Revival and the Ba' Kelalan Revival that occurred between the 1960s and 1990s.

== Economy ==
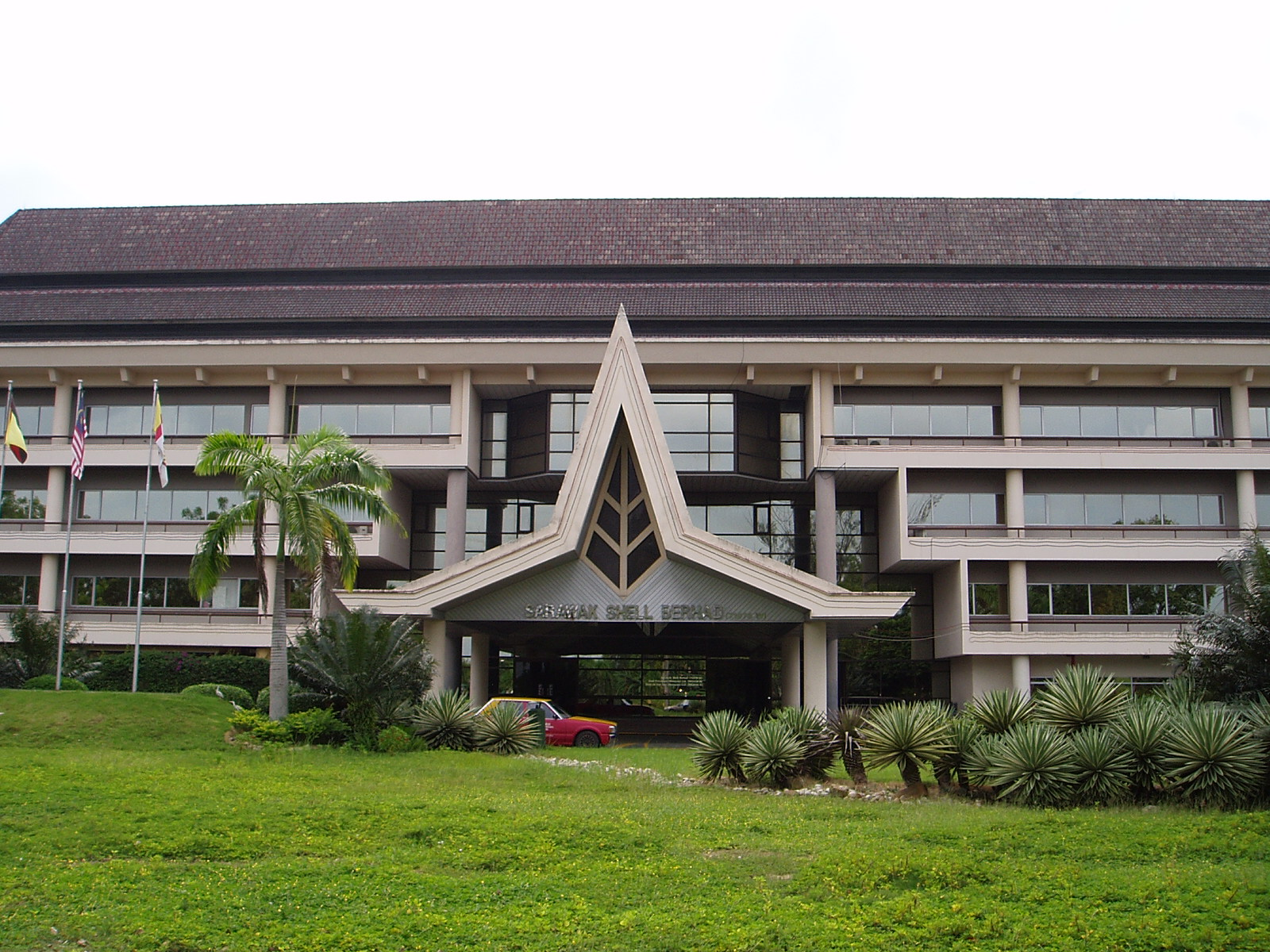
Sarawak Shell Berhad

There are a few industrial areas in Miri, some examples include Kuala Baram Industrial Estate (Mixed, Light, and Medium Industries), Piasau Industrial Estate (Mixed Light Industries), Senadin Industrial Area, Eastwood Industrial Estate and Bekenu Light Industrial Area (food processing).

Miri mainly relies on its oil and gas industry, which contributes significantly to the Gross Domestic Product (GDP) of Sarawak. Sarawak Shell Berhad (upstream business) and Petronas Carigali Sdn Bhd have their offices based in Miri. Other multinational oil and gas companies also set up their offices here, including Nippon Oil, Schlumberger, Baker Hughes, Halliburton, Technip, Ranhill WorleyParsons, and Petra Resources Sdn Bhd. In 1989, Asam Paya Oilfield was discovered in Sarawak inland areas. In 2010, Petronas discovered two oil fields offshore between Bintulu and Miri. In 2011, new underground reserves of oil and gas deposits were discovered by Nippon Oil in an inland region near Miri, Sarawak.

In the 1970 to 1980s, timber exporting industry became one of the major income generators for Miri. Multinational conglomerates based in Miri such as Shin Yang and Samling had their early beginnings in timber industry. Besides, shipbuilding companies such as Sealink Shipyard, Shin Yang Shipping & Shipyard, Berjaya Dockyard, and Sarawak Slipways have their major shipyards set up in Miri - Kuala Baram industrial area along the Baram river.

First large-scale oil palm plantation in Sarawak began in 1968, in which the newly formed Sarawak Oil Palm Berhad (SOPB) planted a total of 5,000-hectare (50 km^{2}) oil palm plantations near Miri by employing Indonesian workers at these plantations. Since the 1980s, SOPB has a total of 30,000-hectare (300 km^{2}) of oil palm in Miri and Bintulu Divisions, generating a total revenue of RM 85 million in 2005. SOPB is now majority-owned by Shin Yang Group and Sarawak Land Custody and Development Authority (LCDA) with its headquarters in Miri. By 2014, oil palm plantations between Miri-Bintulu zone constituted 60% of total oil palm estates in Sarawak.

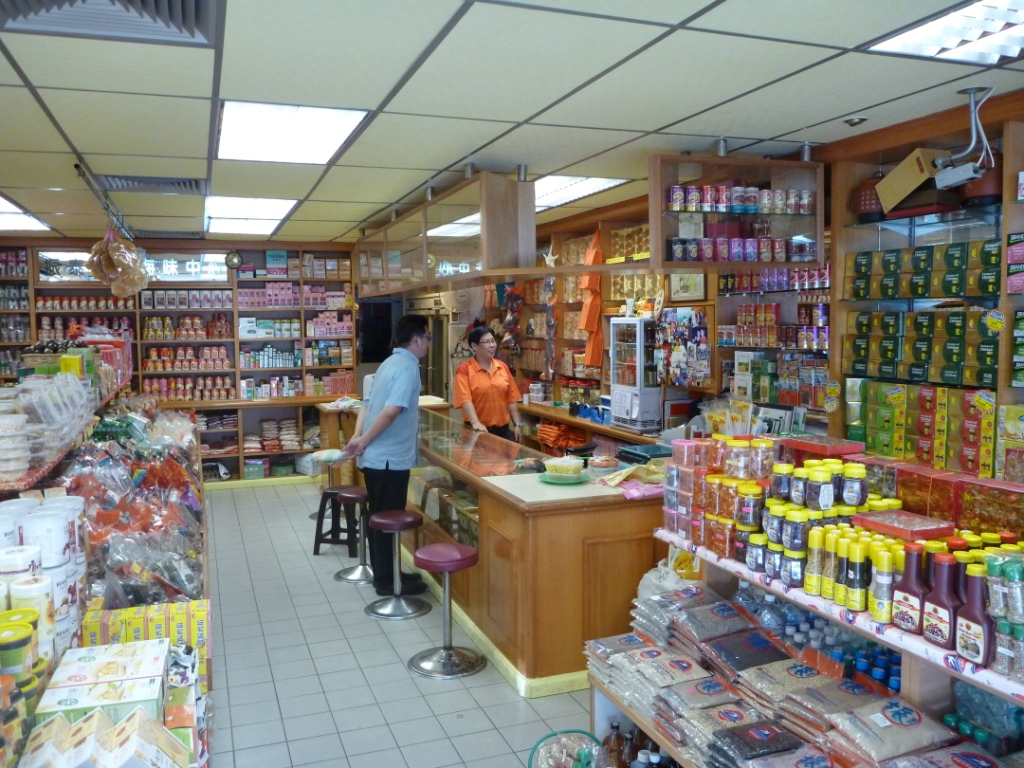
A Chinese shop in Miri selling a variety of needs

Miri Port Authority (MPA) was established on 1 February 1981 and commenced operation on 1 March 1983. It is located near the mouth of Baram River. The port is able to take in ships measuring up to 1,500 GT (Gross Tonnage), with general cargo area of 50,895 m^{2} and total developed area of 34 hectares (0.34 km^{2}; 0.13 mi^{2}) It is mainly used in handling petroleum, timber products, coal, and building materials. A total of 23.94 million metric tonnes of goods was handled by MPA from 2011 to 2013, which earned a total revenue of RM 48.58 million in port dues.

Miri is a shopping destination for visitors coming from the neighbouring country of Brunei because of a discrepancy in currency exchange rate (100 Brunei dollar to around 350 Malaysian ringgit), cheaper items, and a variety of resorts in Miri for recreational activities. Bintang Plaza and Boulevard Shopping Mall are the two major shopping destinations for Brunei people. As of 2014, Miri visitor movement along Kuala Baram-Kuala Belait checkpoint (Sungai Tujoh, along the Sarawak-Brunei border) reached a total of 2.9 million people in one year. Miri is also an eco-tourism gateway to four national parks and a marine national park. Miri is also a destination for Bruneians to go clubbing on occasion.

The education sector is another income generator for Miri. Curtin University, Malaysia brought in RM 480 million foreign exchange annually from 3,000 foreign students studying at the university.

== Transportation ==
=== Road ===
All the roads in Miri are maintained by Miri City Council (MCC). Miri is accessible by road from Bandar Seri Begawan (Brunei) through the Sungai Tujoh checkpoint which is located 35 km north of Miri. Miri is connected to all major cities and towns in Sarawak including Kota Kinabalu in Sabah through the Pan Borneo Highway. Miri is also connected to Bintulu town through a coastal road and Marudi through a 42 km road. ASEAN Bridge is located along the Miri-Baram Highway and crosses the Baram River, providing direct access to neighbouring country of Brunei, and the towns of Limbang and Lawas in Sarawak.

=== Buses and taxis ===
Miri city has 2 bus stations, namely the local (located at Melayu Road next to Tamu Muhibbah and Wisma Pelita Tunku) and long-distance bus stations Miri Sentral. The city bus station is departure station of Miri City Smart Bus bus routes to Kuala Baram, Permy Jaya, Tudan, Senadin, Miri Hospital, RTM (Eastern road from Pujut 1 to Pujut 5), Taman Tunku and Sungai Rait + Bakam. There is one bus to Long Lama, is under Rural Stage Bus Services. Buses to rest of the division within Sarawak, Bandar Seri Begawan, Brunei and Pontianak, Indonesia depart from the long-distance bus station. There is no direct bus to Miri Airport, most people will prefer to use car or taxi because of short distance between airport and city. Local taxi services are also provided in the city with the main taxi stand at China Road in the city centre. Taxis here do not use meters.

=== Air ===
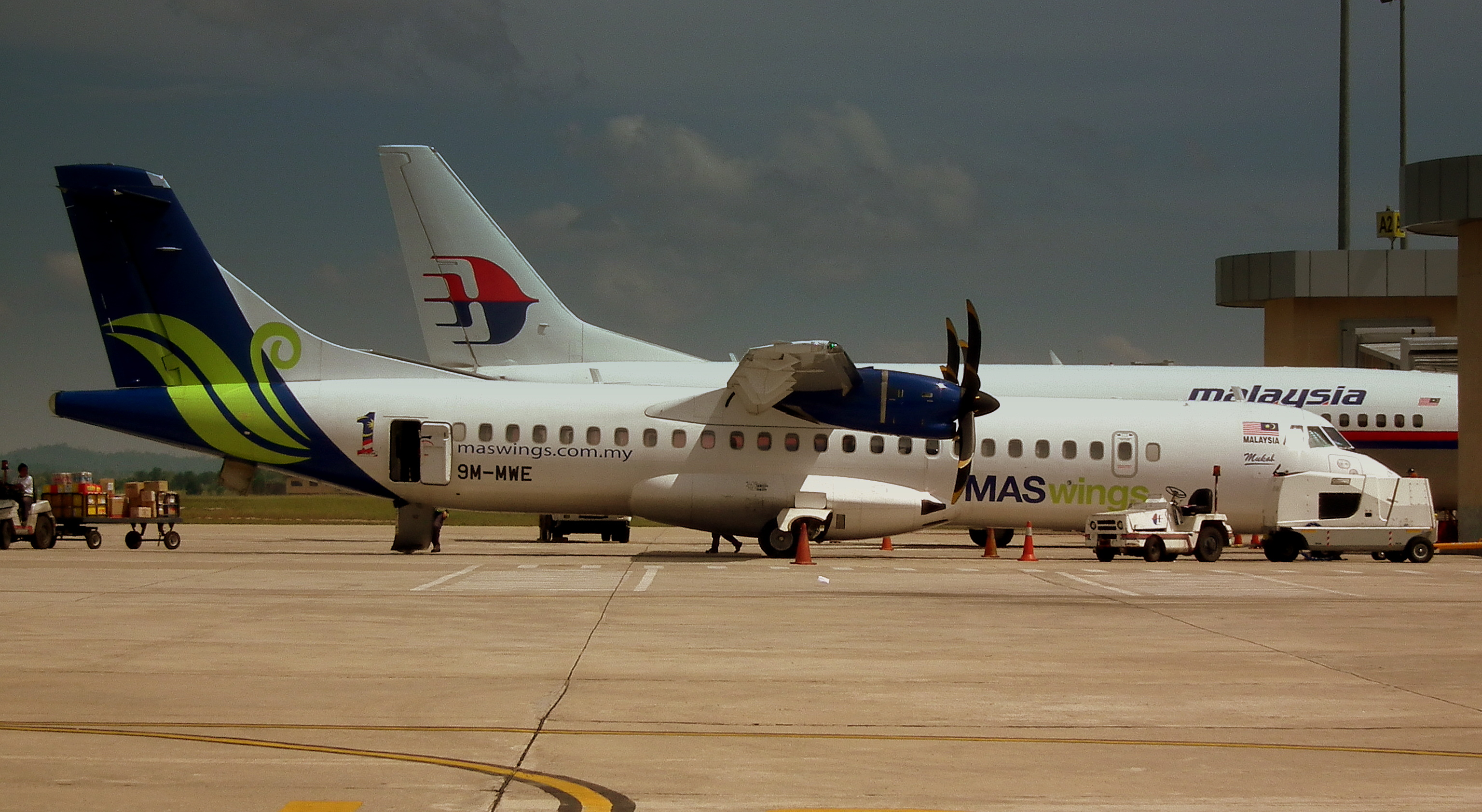
MASwings aircraft beside another bigger aircraft in Miri Airport

Miri Airport (IATA: MYY, ICAO: WBGR) is an important gateway to the northern region of Sarawak. It is located 11 km south of Miri city. It serves as a hub for domestic, international, and rural air services. Miri Airport is the tenth busiest airport in Malaysia and second busiest in Sarawak. It provided services to 2.2 million passengers in 2013. The airport has only one direct international flight to Singapore. It also receives flights from domestic destinations such as Kuala Lumpur, Johor Bahru, Kota Kinabalu, Labuan, Kuching and other major towns in Sarawak. Miri Airport also caters flights to the Sarawak interior such as Bario, Ba'kelalan, Marudi, Lawas, Limbang, and Mukah through MASwings using DHC-6 Twin Otter aircraft.

=== Water ===
Kuala Baram Express Boat Jetty is located 45 minutes away from Miri city centre. It was last operated in the year 2014 and was closed due to the presence of a better air and road connectivity to the interior especially Marudi Town and all other major towns in Baram.

== Other utilities ==
=== Courts of law and legal enforcement ===
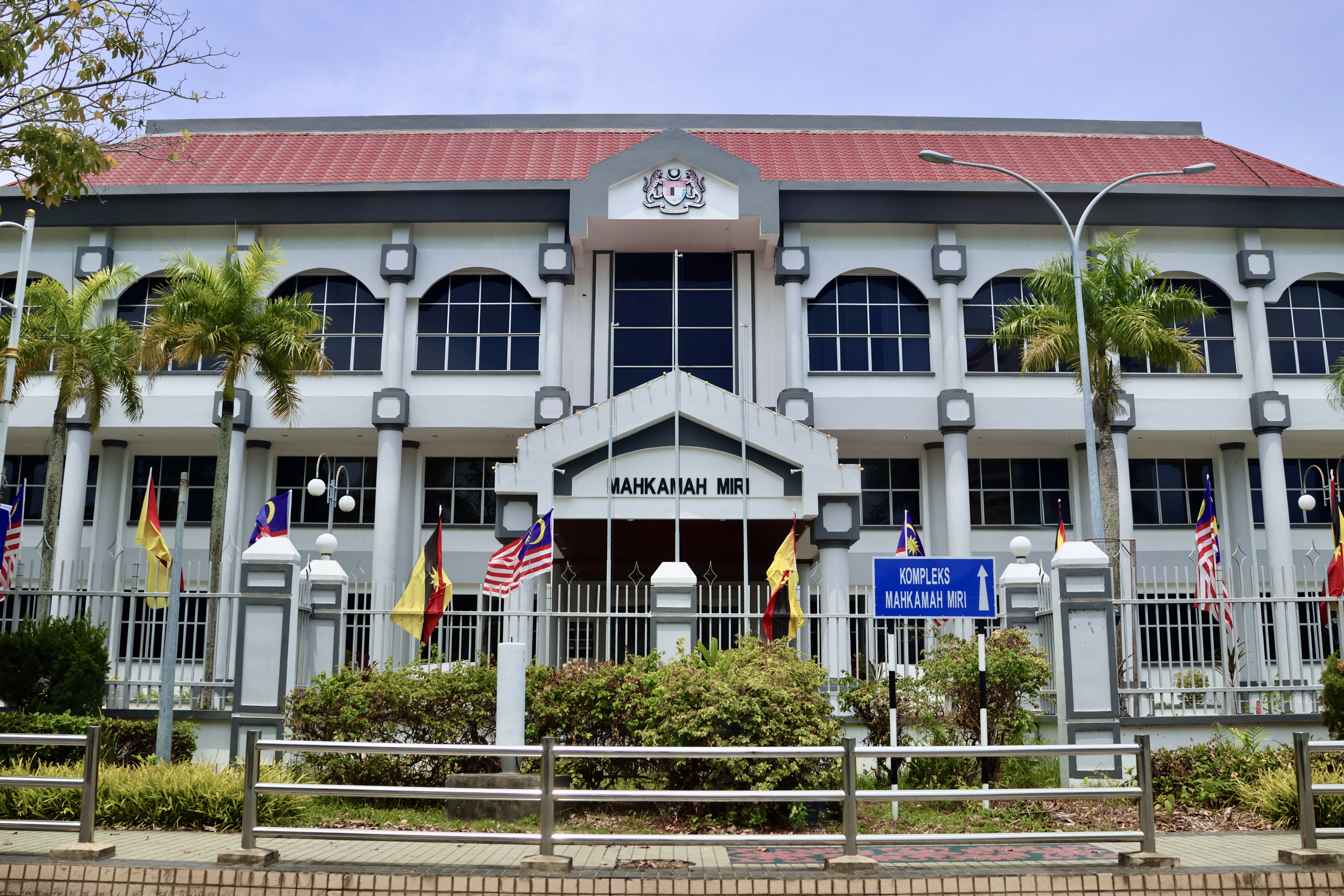
Miri Court Complex.

The current court complex is located at Merdu Road, Miri. It contains the High Court, Sessions Court, and the Magistrate Court. Miri city also has Syariah Subordinate Court which is located at Wisma Pelita Tunku, Miri with area of jurisdiction of Miri District and Marudi District. There is one district police headquarters at Pujut Road, Miri. Miri central police station is located at Raja Road while other police stations are located at Bakam Road, Miri Airport, Kampung Tulang Road, Bekenu, and Niah. There is also a central prison in Miri.

=== Healthcare ===
The current Miri Hospital started its operation on 6 May 1995, located 2.5 km away from Miri city centre and with an area of 87.11 hectares. The hospital has 339 beds, and it provides tertiary specialist services such as surgery, ophthalmology, obstetrics and gynaecology (ONG), nephrology and radiology. It is also the main referral hospital in the northern region of Sarawak, and construction is currently ongoing to add an additional 328 beds in a new block There are currently 3 government polyclinics in Miri city namely Klinik Kesihatan Jalan Merbau, Klinik Kesihatan Tudan, and the new Klinik Kesihatan Bandaraya Miri. Miri has 4 private hospitals currently, with the newest private medical centres including Borneo Medical Centre Miri and KPJ Miri Specialist Hospital. Miri City Medical Centre is a private hospital that started its operation in 2002 and has 30 beds. It is located at Hokkien Road, Miri. Columbia Asia Medical Centre was formerly known as Selesa Medical Centre. It was acquired in 1998, located 4 km downtown Miri. It serves the communities from Miri, Limbang, Marudi, and Brunei. Shell employees make up the largest customer base for this private hospital.

=== Education ===
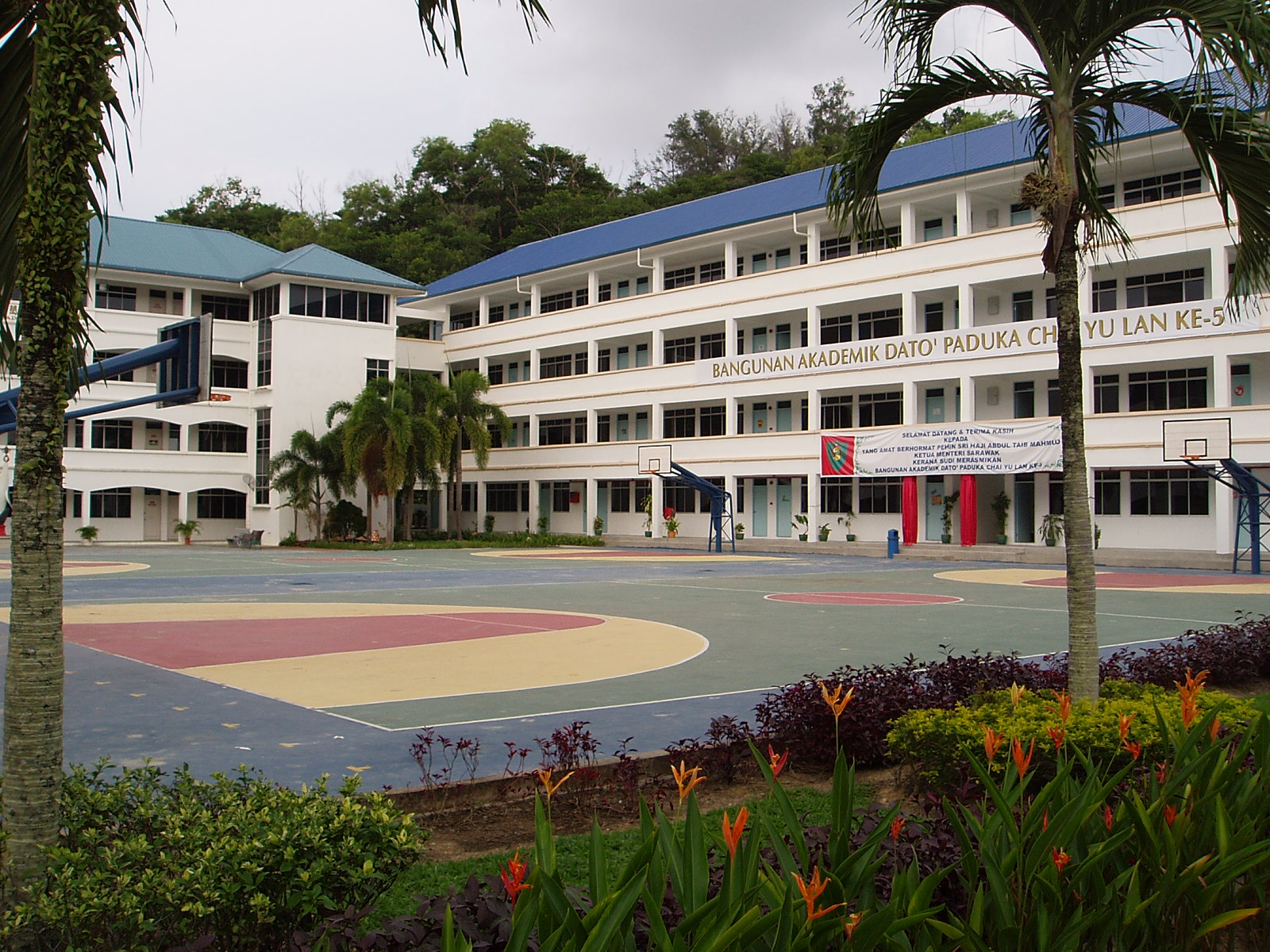
SMJK Chung Hua Miri

All the primary and secondary schools in Miri (under National Education System) are managed by the Miri District Education Office located at Kipas Road, Miri. Among the Chinese primary schools are SJK (C) Chung Hua Miri, SJK (C) Chung Hua Pujut, and SJK (C) Chung Hua Lutong. SK Agama Miri is an Islamic primary school. There are several national primary schools such as: SK Anchi, SK Senadin, and SK St Columba, along with several other national secondary schools in Miri namely SMK Dato Permaisuri SMK Agama Miri, SMK St. Columba, SM Sains Miri, Kolej Tun Dato Tuanku Haji Bujang, SMK St.Joseph, SMK Lutong, SMK Pujut, SMK Lopeng Tengah, SMJK Chung Hua Miri and Sekolah Menengah Teknik Miri. Miri has 2 out of 14 Chinese independent schools in Sarawak. These are Pei Min Middle School (培民中学) and Riam Road Middle School (廉律中学). Tenby International School is the first international school in Miri. In 2019, Tenby International School Miri was renamed Knewton Global Schools under new ownership. Other private schools in Miri such as Sekolah Rendah Sri Mawar and Sekolah Rendah Sri Mulia are providers of primary education.

Curtin University, Malaysia is the first foreign university to establish its campus in Sarawak since 1999. It offers business, accounting, and engineering courses. Institut Pendidikan Guru Malaysia Kampus Miri Sarawak (Teachers Training Institute Malaysia Miri) offers training for teachers placements in primary and secondary schools. I-Systems College offers a nursing programme. Fajar International College (FIC) offers a Diploma in Occupational Safety & Health (DIPOSH), accounting, and business studies courses. IBS College was established in 1998, currently offering finance, business, accounting, and security courses. Maxcel Institute of Management offers Diploma programme for Hotel and Tourism Management.

Cahaya Education and Training Academy (Ceta) offers training courses on oil and gas industries. Institut Latihan Perindustrian Miri (Miri Industry Training Institute) was formed in 2004, currently offering courses such as electrician, product design, and telecommunication. RIAM Institute of Technology Sarawak (RIAMTEC) was established in 1996, offering technical training in the fields of agriculture and mechanics. Institut Kemahiran Belia Negara (National Youth skills Institute) and Pusat Pembangunan Kemahiran Sarawak (Sarawak Skills Development Centre) also offer technical training for students. Kolej Komuniti Miri (Miri Community College) offers short module courses upon request from the public. Open University Malaysia (OUM) also operates a learning centre in Miri.

=== Libraries ===
Miri City Council Library was established in 1958. Currently, it has branches in Piasau, Lutong, and Taman Tunku. Pustaka Miri is a regional library established by the state-run Sarawak State Library. It is located at Miri City Fan.

== Culture and leisure ==
=== Attractions and recreational spots ===
==== Cultural ====
Miri May Fest has been held in Miri since 1989. It is a month-long celebration of entertainment programmes, trade fairs, cultural, arts, sports, and social activities organised by various governmental agencies. Miri City Day will also be held during the Miri May Fest. Gong Xi Fa Cai Bazaar is held annually a few weeks before the Chinese New Year eve. There will be stalls opening daily selling food and drinks, clothes, decorative items, potted plants, paintings, and handicrafts. Various entertainment programmes such as lion and dragon dances will be held every evening. Miri International Dance for Humanity is held annually since 2004 by Miri Chapter of Malaysian Red Crescent Society to promote racial and cultural harmony. This event will showcase up to 40 to 50 multicultural dance troupes which attract an audience of around 3,500. No dancing competition will be held during this event. Donation cards will be distributed to raise funds for the Red Crescent Society. 916 Malaysia Day Countdown cum Street Party has been held annually since 2010. It consists of a variety of outdoor sports events, street parties, and entertainment programmes which runs beyond midnight to commemorate the formation of Malaysia on 16 September 1963. Miri International Deep Sea Fishing Tournament is held annually at Luconia Shoals at South China Sea. Participants will depart from the Marina Bay, Miri and head up to the ocean for 3 days. The participant who catches the biggest fish in that category wins. Miri city Christmas Parade is held annually since 2007. Churches in Miri would start the parade at Miri City Fan and cover the main streets in the city centre.

==== Historical ====
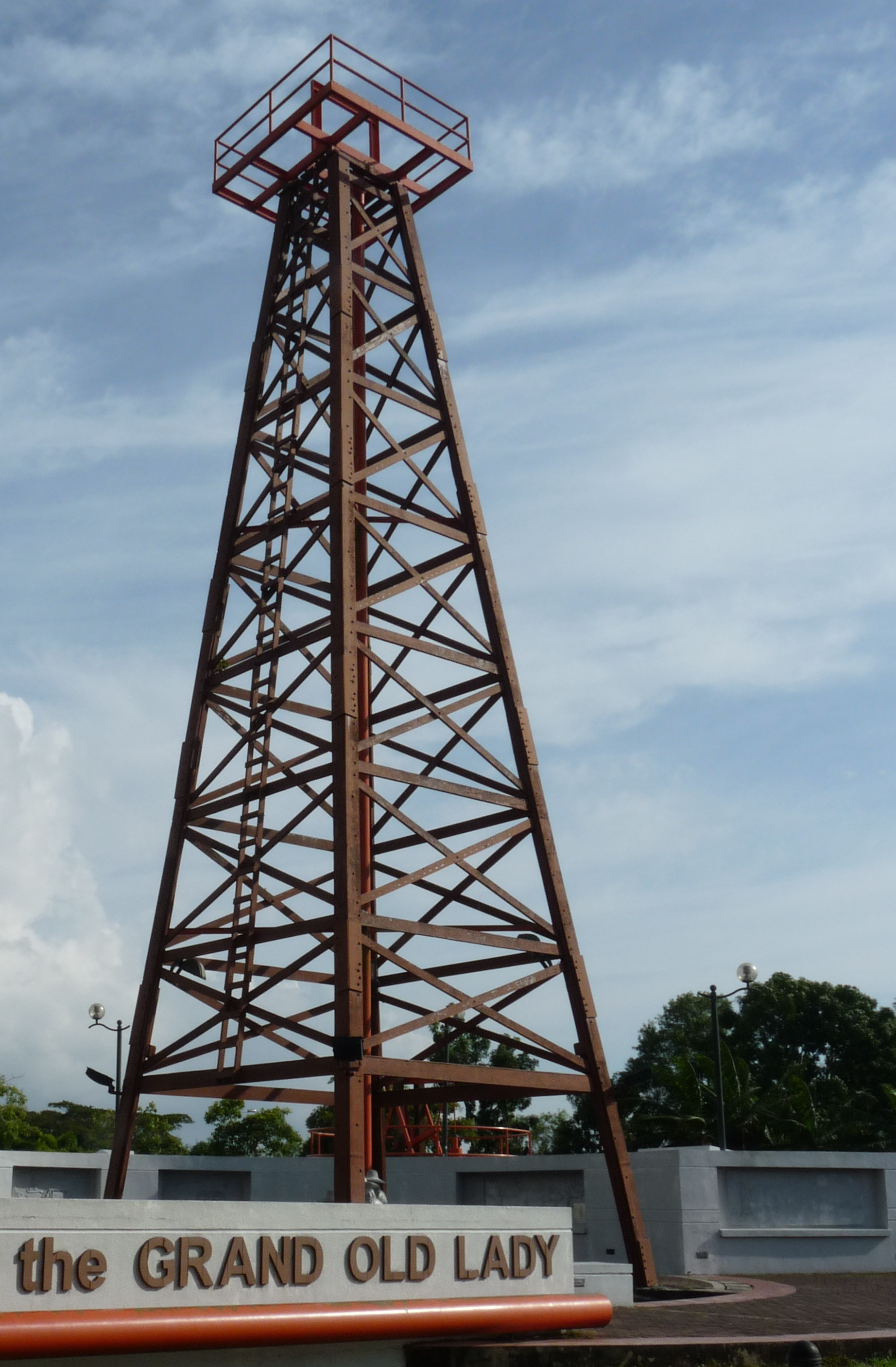
Grand Old Lady at the Petroleum Museum.

In 2005, a petroleum museum was opened in Miri to preserve the city's roots as an oil and gas city. The museum is at the site of "Grand Old Lady", the first oil well in Malaysia which was opened in 1910. Visitors are able to interact with advanced devices displayed in the museum. Niah Archeology Museum is located near the archaeological site of Niah cave. It exhibits the prehistorical artefacts found in the area. Baram Regional Museum was opened in 1997, housed inside Fort Hose at Marudi. The fort was burnt down in 1994, but it was rebuilt later according to its original design and was converted into a museum. It displays historical and cultural artefacts belonging to various ethnic groups living in the area. The Miri Tua Pek Kong Temple was built in 1913 to give thanks to a monk who was believed to chase away evil spirits. The evil spirits were believed to have caused an unknown epidemic in Miri. It is the only building which survives World War II.

==== Leisure and conservation areas ====
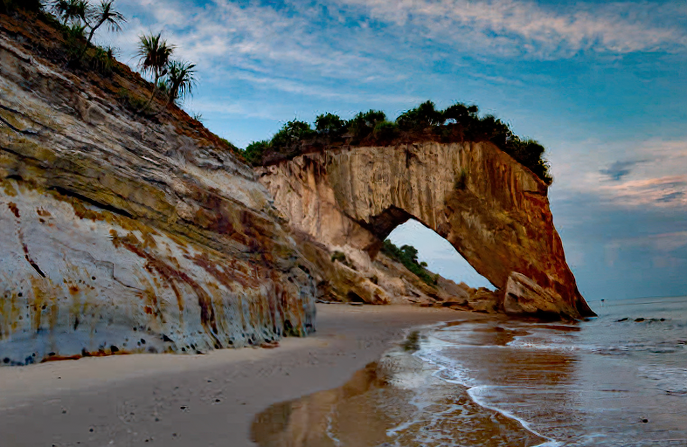
Horse Cliff in Tusan Beach before collapse in 2020

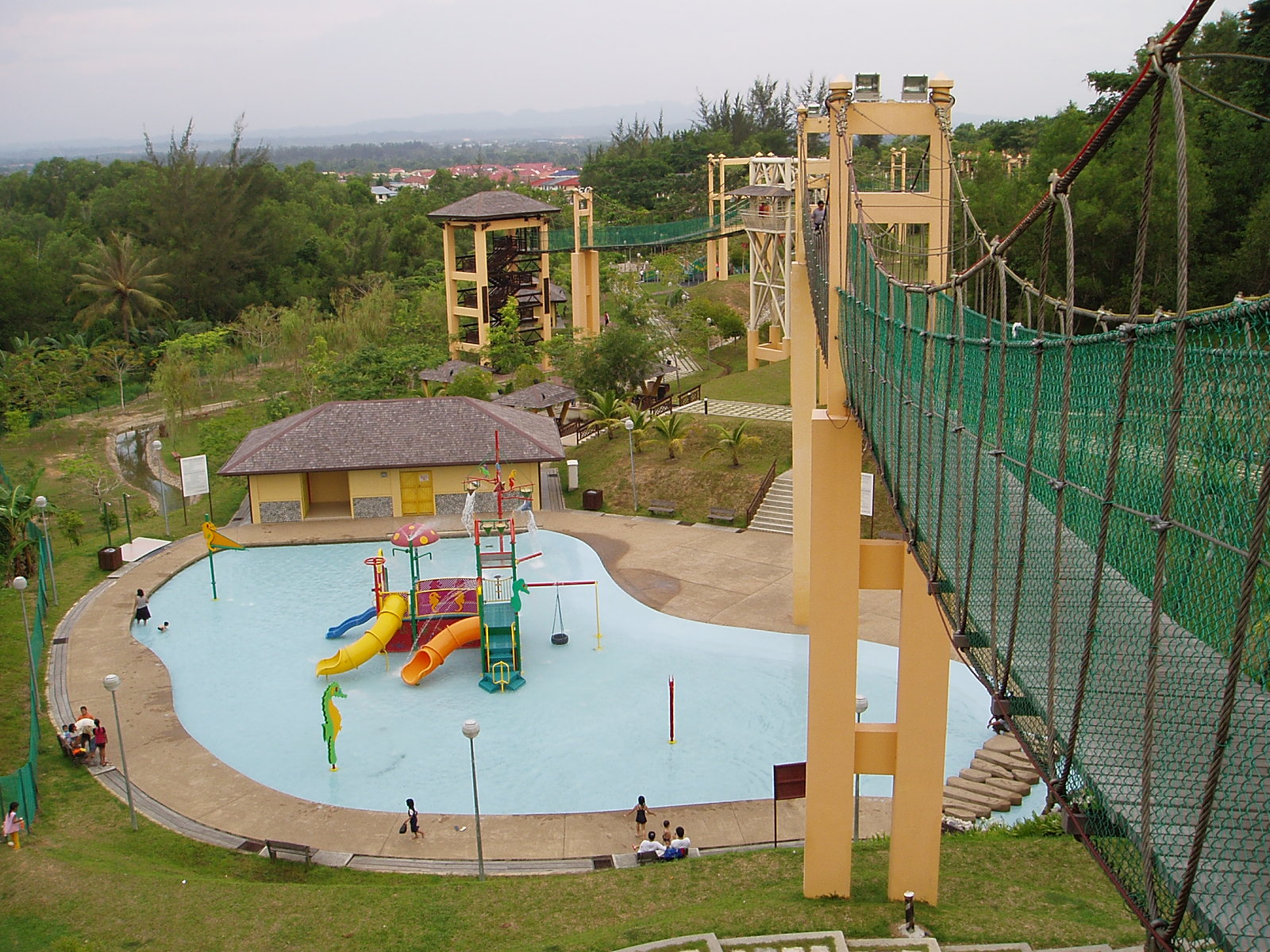
Taman Awam Miri (Miri Public Park)

Miri is surrounded by five national parks, namely: Gunung Mulu National Park, which is a renowned UNESCO World Heritage Site; Niah National Park; Lambir Hills National Park; Loagan Bunut National Park, and Miri-Sibuti Coral Reef National Park. Tanjung Lobang Beach is the oldest recreational park in Miri. There are two wooden piers extending out into the ocean which offer a view of the coastline and the seahorse lighthouse at Marina Bay. Miri Marriott Hotel is located at Tanjung Lobang Beach. Marina Bay also has berthing facilities for yachts. Hawaii Beach is located 15 minutes away from Miri city. Picnic and barbecue facilities are provided here. Lutong Beach is suitable for paragliding and paramotor sports. Luak Esplanade Beach is located 11 km south of the city. It is a common spot for barbecues and picnics. Further down to the south of Luak Esplanade Beach is Bungai Beach, which is located at Bekenu, about 1 hour drive from Miri city. Since 2015, the "Blue Tears" phenomenon caused by Dinoflagellate bioluminescence can be seen at Miri beaches particularly at Tusan beach, which is a half-an-hour drive from the Miri city.

Miri Bulatan Park was opened to the public in 1993. It has a man-made lake, a jogging track, and a traffic garden. Traffic games will held every year at Miri Bulatan Park. Taman Awam Miri (Miri Public Park) is located 3 km away from Miri city centre. It has a children's playground, botanical garden, and a jogging trail. Miri City Fan is an urban park complex that has a variety of theme gardens, botanical garden, a swimming pool, a library, and an amphitheatre where concerts are frequently held. Taman Bunga (Flower Garden) is located at Asrama Road. Every plant here has a label which list the name and characteristics of the plant.

==== Other attractions ====
Miri Crocodile Farm Wildlife Mini Zoo is located near the Baram Delta. It houses 1,000 estuarine crocodiles including Malayan gharial crocodiles. Man-made sanctuary pools are also constructed for the crocodiles. Other animals can also be found here such as cassowary, sun bears, python, monkeys and porcupines. Visitors are allowed to feed the animals with bananas available from the canteen.

==== Shopping ====
Miri has always been a shopping haven for nearby Bruneians, thanks to the favourable currency exchange rates. There are plenty of shopping malls in Miri and the popular ones include Bintang Megamall, Boulevard Shopping Complex, The Imperial Mall, E-Mart, Miri Plaza (Servay Hypermarket), MYY Mall, Permy Mall, Soon Hup Shopping Complex, Wisma Pelita Tunku, and Permaisuri Imperial City Mall.

Saberkas Weekend Market is located at Sarbekas Commercial Centre. It opens in late evening every Friday, Saturday and Sunday. There are over 170 stalls in the market which sell vegetables, fruits, sea products, drinks, satay, grilled fish, BBQ chicken wings and other products such as local handicrafts, clothes as well as used magazines at reasonable prices. Miri Handicraft Centre is located at Brooke Road, Miri. It features handicrafts and souvenirs of Sarawak such as colourful bags, beadwork, woodcarvings, and textiles made by local indigenous groups, Chinese, and Malay artisans.

=== Music ===
There are three music festivals in Miri, namely Borneo Jazz Festival, Asia Music Festival (AMF) and Miri Country Music Fest (MCMF). Borneo Jazz Festival was started in 2006. It is a 2-night festival of 4 performances in each night by local and international jazz musicians at Parkcity Everly hotel, Miri. Asia Music Festival is also a 2-day event featuring artists and musicians from Asian countries such as India, Taiwan, Philippines, and Indonesia. It was first held in 2013 at Eastwood Valley Golf and Country Club, about 5 km from the city centre. It attracts about 4,000 music lovers attending the event. Miri Country Music Fest (MCMF) is a one-day event introduced in 2014, held at Parkcity Everly Hotel, Miri. Among the activities that can be found here are music and dance workshop, and night concert featuring country music bands from all over the world. Stalls selling food items, games, and souvenir items are also available.

=== Local radio stations ===
Several local radio stations have their office in the city, this include Hitz FM Sarawak (105.8), Era FM Sarawak (101.3), MY FM Sarawak (103.2) and Cats FM (93.3).

== Cuisine ==
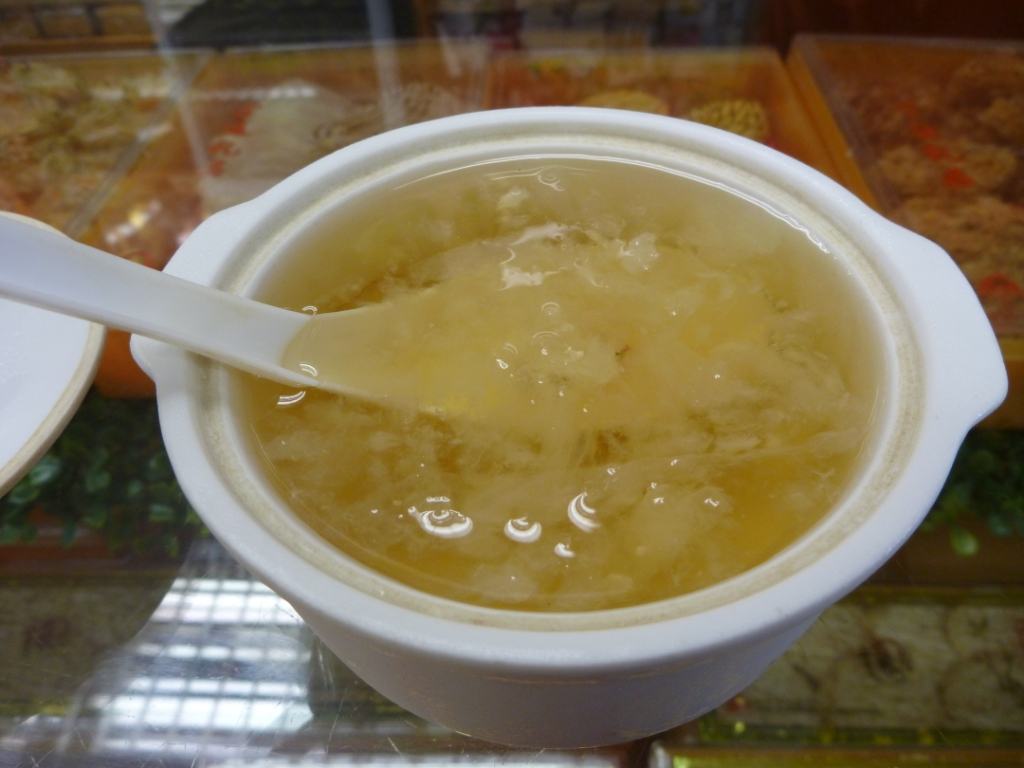
A bowl of bird nest soup in Miri

Miri Central Market (also known as Miri Open Air Market) is located at the Miri Old Town centre. It offers a wide choices of local food whose recipes which have been passed on for generations. Local delicacies such as Miri Curry Rice, chicken porridge, open air kolo mee, and Char kway teow can be found here. Exotic dishes of pig's stomach cooked with pineapple and pig's blood with chives can also be found at the central market. There are also a variety of restaurants in Miri that offer seafood, Western food, Chinese, Japanese, and Muslim food. Authentic cuisine from Kelabit Highlands especially from Bario can also be found here.

== Notable people ==
- Paul Phua, businessman, bookmaker, and poker player.
- Zee Avi, international singer and ukulele player.
- Shaun Maloney, Scottish football Manager.
- Abdul Taib Mahmud, fourth chief minister of Sarawak.
- Joseph Kalang Tie, Sarawak FA football player.
- George Chan Hong Nam, Sarawak's former deputy chief minister.
- Wee Han Wen, first chairman of the Miri City Council.
- Watson Nyambek, ex-national sprinter.
- Lukanisman Awang Sauni, politician.
- Raymond Jalong, famous porn actor and starred in a local 2018 Sarawakian Movie, Main Keloh.

== Sister cities ==
Miri currently has two sister cities:

- Guangning County, People's Republic of China
- (Taiwan) Hualien County, Republic of China
