= San Ching Tian Temple =

Chinese temple in Miri, Malaysia

- Malay: Tokong San Ching Tian; Chinese: 美里三清殿
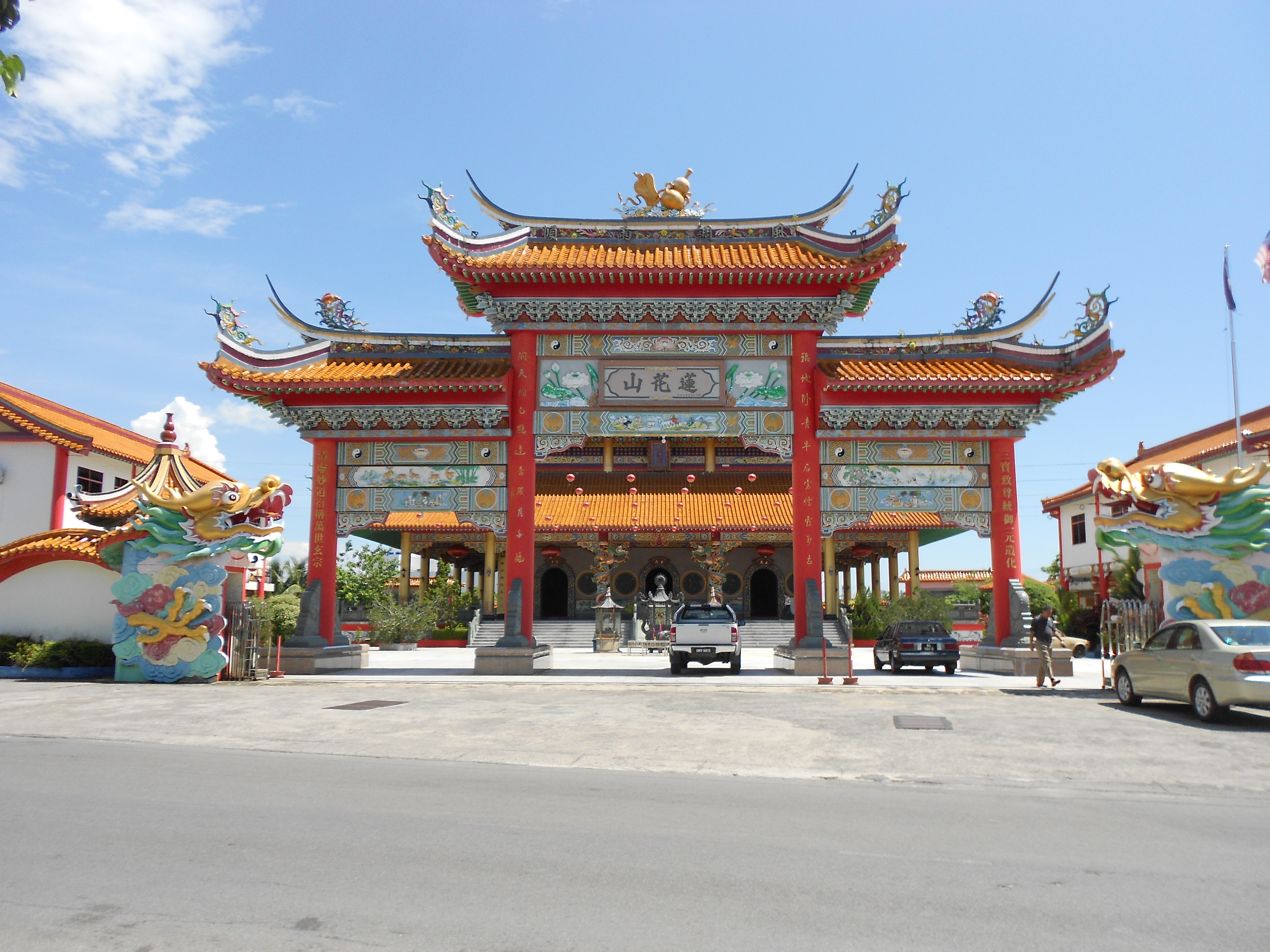

Religion
- Affiliation: Taoism
- District: Miri District

Location
- Location: Miri
- State: Sarawak
- Country: Malaysia
- Interactive map of San Ching Tian Temple
- Coordinates: 4°25′22.259″N 114°0′10.828″E

Architecture
- Type: Chinese temple
- Established: 2001
- Completed: 2003
- Construction cost: RM10 million

San Ching Tian Temple (Chinese: 美里三清殿) (also called as Lian Hua San Chieng Tien) is a Chinese temple located in a 1.5-acre site bordered by housing area in Krokop 9 Road of Miri, Sarawak, Malaysia, where it is also considered as the largest Taoist temple in Southeast Asia.

== History ==
The temple was built in 2000 and completed after three years with its entire decorations and motif including the dragon and its Three Pure Ones statues were imported from China.
