= Cyrtodactylus miriensis =

Scientific classification
- Kingdom: Animalia
- Phylum: Chordata
- Class: Reptilia
- Order: Squamata
- Suborder: Gekkota
- Family: Gekkonidae
- Genus: Cyrtodactylus
- Species: C. miriensis

Binomial name
- Cyrtodactylus miriensis Davis, Das, Leaché, Karin, Brennan, Jackman, Nashriq, Chan, & Bauer, 2021

Species of lizard

Cyrtodactylus miriensis is a species of gecko that is endemic to Sarawak in Malaysian Borneo. The specific name refers to the Miri District in Sarawak. It probably is present also in Brunei, but this remains unconfirmed. Recent observations recorded on iNaturalist have shown the species to be present in Brunei.

Cyrtodactylus miriensis can reach at least 71 mm (2.8 in) in snout–vent length.
