= Tua Pek Kong Temple, Miri =

Chinese temple in Miri, Malaysia

Tua Pek Kong Temple
- Malay: Tokong Tua Pek Kong; Chinese: 美里大伯公廟
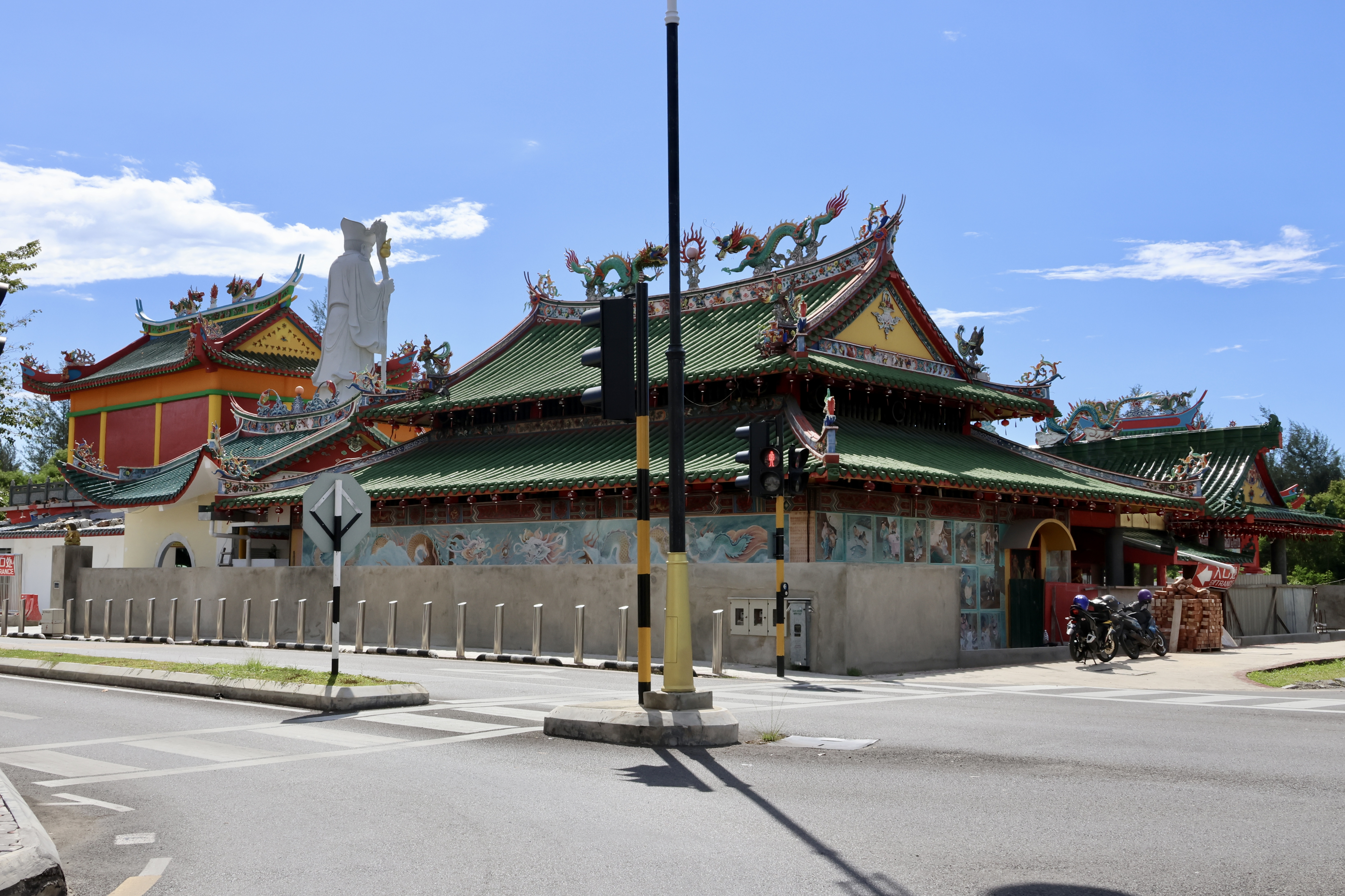

Religion
- Affiliation: Taoism
- District: Miri District

Location
- Location: Miri
- State: Sarawak
- Country: Malaysia
- Interactive map of Tua Pek Kong Temple
- Coordinates: 4°23′29.889″N 113°59′6.21″E

Architecture
- Type: Chinese temple
- Established: 1913

Tua Pek Kong Temple (Chinese: 美里大伯公廟) is a Chinese temple situated right next to the Miri Fish Market in Miri, Sarawak, Malaysia. It is the oldest temple in the present-day Miri city.

== History ==
Following the oil boom of Miri in the early 1900s, the town's population increased rapidly before an unknown epidemic began to strike the town resulting in the deaths of many of the town's population. The local Chinese residents believed the epidemic was caused by evil spirits roaming around the area. A Chinese man named Chan Chak began calling a monk to appease the spirits with a spirit-pacifying ritual being carried out near the Miri River and with an altar being placed there. When the epidemic began to subside following the ritual, the local Chinese residents constructed a temple near the river to revere Tua Pek Kong in gratitude to the latter in 1913. The temple remains to this day having survived the Japanese bombings on the town during World War II. It was renovated in 1977. In 2017, a new paifang has been constructed for the temple.
