= Miri Division =

Miri
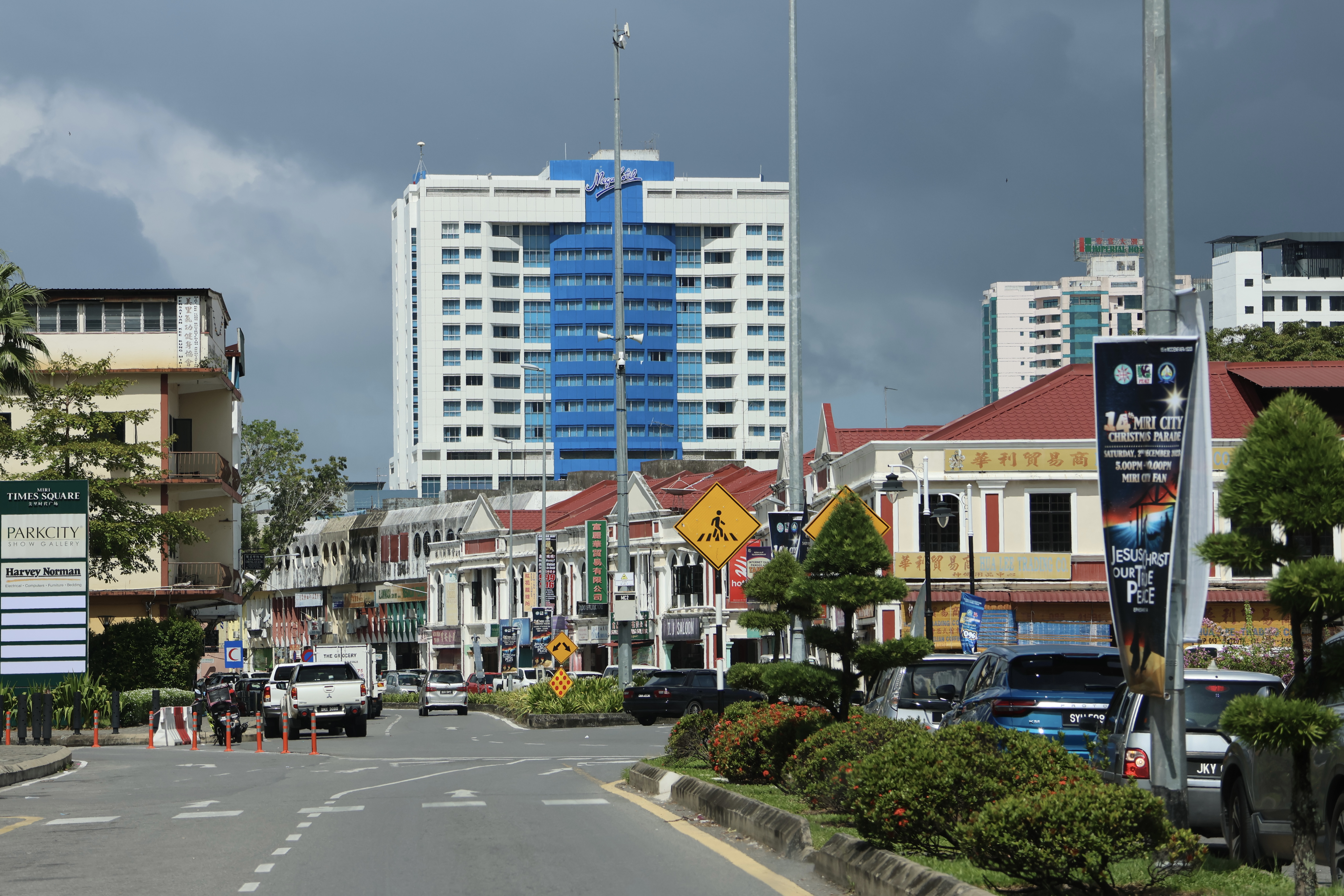
- Miri city

- Divisions of Sarawak

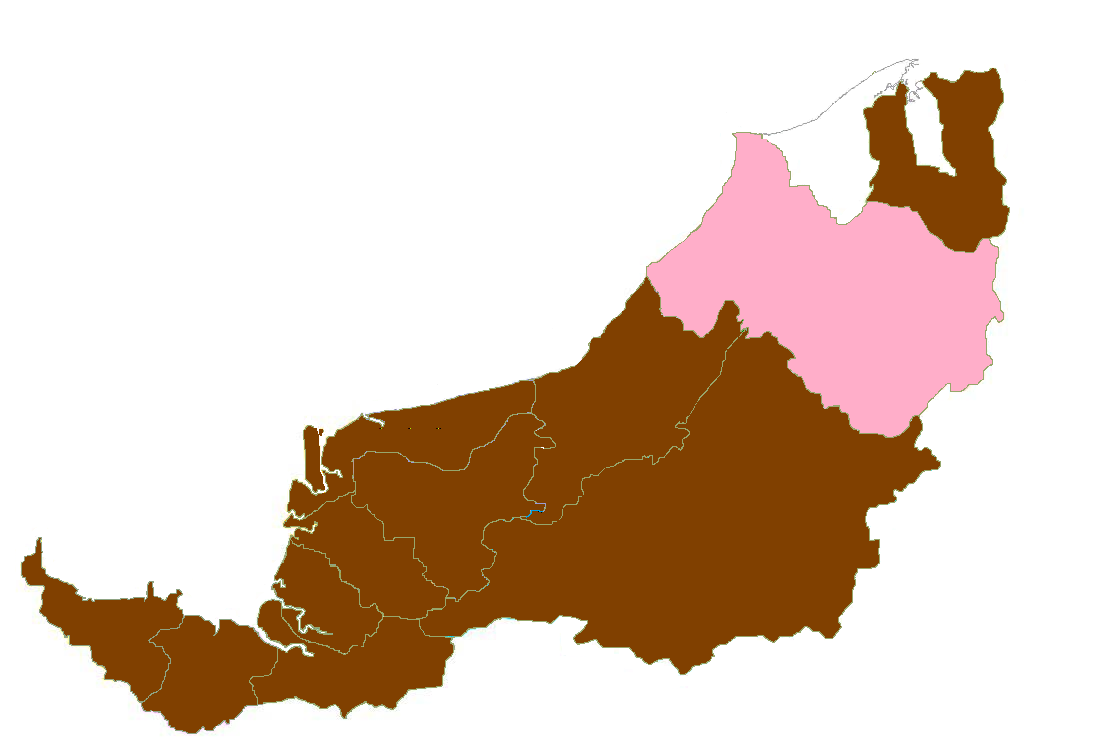
- Coordinates: 3.7°N 114.5°E
- Division Office location: Miri
- Local area government (s): Miri City Council (MBM); Majlis Daerah Subis (MDS); Majlis Daerah Marudi (MDM)

Area
  - Total: 26,777.1 km^{2} (10,338.7 sq mi)

Population (2000)
  - Total: 316,400
  - Density: 11.82/km^{2} (30.60/sq mi)
- Resident: Hj. Mastapa bin Hj. Julaihi
- License plate prefix: QM

Miri Division is one of the twelve administrative divisions of Sarawak, Malaysia.

== Geography ==
It has a total area of 26,777.1 square kilometres, and is the second largest division after Kapit Division. The seat of this division is the city of Miri.

Miri Division consists of five districts: Miri, Subis, Marudi, Beluru and Telang Usan.

Of the 21 seismic events that happened in Sarawak from 1874 to 2011, the majority of them occurred between Niah and Selangau regions, which corresponds to Miri and Bintulu Divisions with Modified Mercalli intensity scale (MMI) of 3.5 to 5.3 magnitude.

== Population ==
The population of Miri Division (year 2000 census) was 316,400. Ethnically, the population was Iban, Chinese, Malay (mostly Bruneian, Miriek as well as Kedayan), Melanau, Kayan, Kenyah, Lun Bawang and Kelabit. Due to the petroleum industry, there is also a large foreign worker population.

== Economy ==
The economy is largely based on petroleum and natural gas extraction from both onshore and offshore wells, and related petroleum refining, liquefied natural gas and chemical production. Another major industry is timber processing from Miri's huge tropical rainforest. Processed wood products, rather than log export has been given priority by the government. Agriculture is includes oil palm, rubber, and pepper as the main products. Tourism, particularly ecotourism, is a growing component of the economy.

== Protected areas ==
- Gunung Mulu National Park
- Loagan Bunut National Park
- Miri-Sibuti Coral Reef National Park
- Niah National Park
- Pulong Tau National Park
- Usun Apau National Park

== Administration ==
=== Members of Parliament ===
Parliament	Member of Parliament	Party
P217 Bintulu	YB Datuk Tiong King Sing	GPS (PDP)
P218 Sibuti	YB Dato Lukanisman Awang Sauni	GPS (PBB)
P219 Miri	YB Michael Teo	PH (PKR)
P220 Baram	YB Dato Anyi Ngau	GPS (PDP)

== Education ==
- Curtin University Malaysia
- IPG Kampus Miri
