= Miri Sentral =

Miri Sentral Bus Terminal

General information
- Location: Jalan Miri By Pass, 98000 Miri, Sarawak
- Coordinates: 4°21′59″N 114°0′27″E
- Owner: Konsortium Bas Ekspres (Sarawak) Sdn Bhd
- Operator: Bus Asia (Biaramas Express), MTC Express, EVA Express, Sungei Merah

History
- Opened: 18 January 2025; 19 months ago
Location

Miri Sentral Bus Terminal is a regional bus terminal located in Miri, a city of Sarawak, Malaysia. It is a central bus hub for express buses from Miri serving other cities of Sarawak, as well as the neighbouring region of Brunei.

== History ==
The terminal, started construction in November 2021. Projected to be completed in 2024, the terminal started its full operation on January 18, 2025. Prior to its operation, all buses terminates at the old terminal area in Pujut, which has ceased operation on the same day.

== Routes ==
The terminal serves express buses to other areas in Sarawak, being the northern gateway to the state's main corridor. It has buses to Sibu, Bintulu and Kuching, as well as other towns in between (Sri Aman, Serian, Sarikei etc.). In March 2026, a new cross-border route to Bandar Seri Begawan, Brunei has been introduced by Bus Asia.
