= Miri-Sibuti Coral Reef National Park =

Protected area in Malaysia

Coordinates: 4°19′N 113°51′E

Miri-Sibuti Coral Reefs National Park
- MSCRNP
- IUCN category II (national park)
- Interactive map of Miri-Sibuti Coral Reefs National Park
- Location: Sarawak, Malaysia
- Nearest city: Miri
- Area: 1,721.11 km^{2} (664.52 sq mi)
- Designation: National park
- Designated: 2007
- Governing body: Sarawak Forestry Corporation (SFC)

Miri-Sibuti Coral Reefs National Park is a protected area of coral reefs in Miri Division, Sarawak, Malaysia, off the island of Borneo. The park is a popular dive destination and covers 186,930 hectares of water bodies. The Miri-Sibuti Coral Reefs National Park, lying at depths ranging from 7 to 50 metres (23 to 164 ft) at the seaward edge, has an average visibility of 10 to 30 metres (33 to 98 ft). The best time to dive is from late March through November each year. Popular diving sites includes Anemone Garden, Grouper Patch Reef, Atago Maru Wreck and Seafan Garden. There are also some wreck dives. It is one of Malaysia’s most recently discovered diving locations and the second largest offshore/marine national park created in the state of Sarawak after Luconia Shoal National Park

The reefs house a wide diversity of marine creatures including soft corals like leather corals, sea whips, Bubble corals, staghorn corals, Dendronephthya and Gorgonia sea fans, as well as sponges including elephant ear spongees. Fish species include clown fish, yellow and blueback fusiliers, angelfish, butterfly fish, sea perch, lizardfish, batfish, jackfish, barracudas, Napoleon wrasse and sharks. Other creatures include feather stars, giant clams, nudibranches, sea anemone and sea horses.

== See also ==
- List of national parks of Malaysia
- List of reefs
