= Loagan Bunut National Park =

National park in Sarawak

- Taman Negara Loagan Bunut
- IUCN category II (national park)
- Location within East Malaysia
- Location: Sarawak, Malaysia
- Coordinates: 3°46′N 114°13′E
- Area: 100 km^{2} (39 mi^{2})
- Established: 1990
- Website: www.sarawakforestry.com/htm/snp-np-loagan.html

The Loagan Bunut National Park (Malay: Taman Negara Loagan Bunut) is a national park located in Miri Division, Sarawak, Malaysia, on Borneo island. The park was named after the Loagan Bunut lake nearby, which is connected to Sungai Bunut (sungai is Malay for river), Sungai Baram and Sungai Tinjar. This park occupies a space of 100 km^{2} (39 mi^{2}) and is well known for its rich biodiversity and unique aquatic ecosystem.

The national park was gazetted on January 1, 1990, and it was opened to public on August 29, 1991.

== See also ==
- List of national parks of Malaysia
