= Miri City Council =

- Majlis Bandaraya Miri

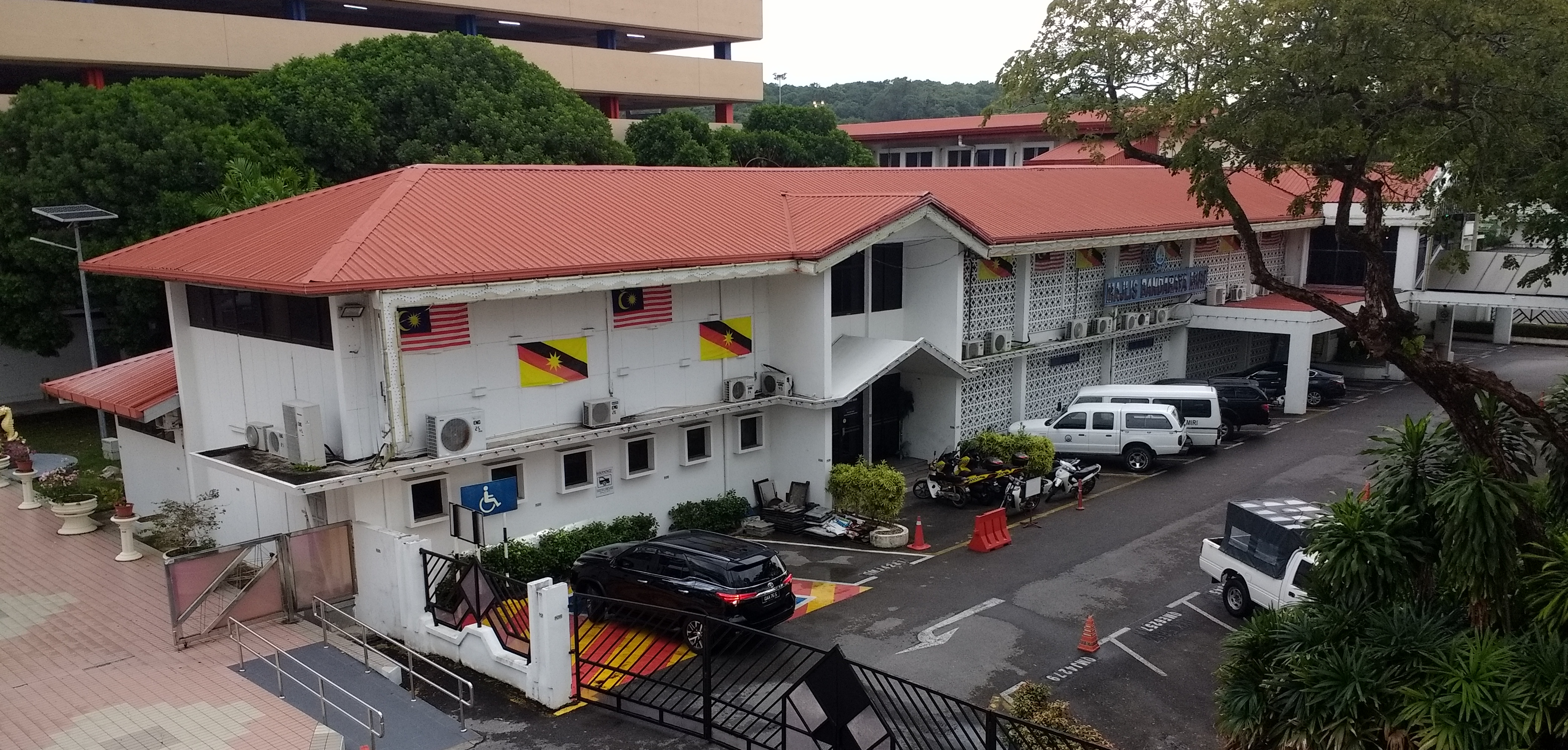

Agency overview
- Formed: 20 May 2005; 21 years ago
- Preceding agency: Miri Municipal Council
- Jurisdiction: City of Miri
- Headquarters: Jalan Raja, 98000 Miri, Sarawak, Malaysia
- Motto: Progress with the Society (Malay: Maju Bersama Masyarakat)
- Agency executives: Adam Yii Siew Sang, Mayor; Haji Ariffin Bin Mohamad, Deputy Mayor; Mohamad Junaidi Mohidin, City Secretary
- Website: www.miricouncil.gov.my

The Miri City Council (Malay: Majlis Bandaraya Miri, abbreviated MBM) is the city council which administers the city of Miri in the state of Sarawak, Malaysia. This council was established after the city was officially granted city status on 20 May 2005. Initially covering 997 square kilometres, the area of jurisdiction of the city was expanded to over 5,000 square kilometres with the addition of Bario sub-district in 2015.

The council consists of the mayor plus twenty-eight councillors appointed to serve a one-year term by the Sarawak State Government. The purpose of this council is to upkeep infrastructure, public amenities, and facilities. In addition, the council also functions to ensure an orderly construction of buildings, safeguard public health, and beautify the environment.

== History ==
The establishment of the Council may be traced back to the early 1930s. Miri Municipal Board was established following the enactment of Municipal Order M-7 in 1933, during the period of Kingdom of Sarawak. Resident from the 4th Division of Sarawak became the chairman of the board. Municipal officer and several community leaders also became members of the board. The operation of the Board was interrupted during Japanese Occupation of Sarawak from 1941 to 1945.

On 1 January 1956, Miri Municipal Board was reconstituted to become Miri Urban District Council, financially self-supporting and managing its own local affairs. The Council consisted of 17 nominated members.

In December 1960, Council's general election was held for the first time in Miri. The elected Council members were consolidated under Local Authority (Miri District Council) Order 1960. The new Council started its operation on 9 January 1961. The new Council was able to extend its jurisdiction to Miri sub-district. There were 18 members in the Council. Advisers of the Council include Divisional Engineer, the Superintendent of Lands and Surveys, the Divisional Medical Officer, the Divisional Education Officer and the Superintendent of Police. After the second Council general election in mid-1963, the jurisdiction of the Council covers 337 square miles (872.8 km^{2}) with a population of 24,049, based on the 1960 Census Report.

MDC was restructured to Miri Municipal Council (MMC) in 1981 and new Councillors were sworn in on 6 November 1981. MMC had a Chairman, Deputy Chairman, and 24 Councillors. All of them were nominated members.

Miri Municipal Council was upgraded to Miri City Council when Miri was granted city status on 20 May 2005.

In August 2015, Bario sub-district was transferred from Marudi District Council to Miri City Council in view of better infrastructure and accessibility from Miri Airport when compared to Marudi. This addition gives the city an exclave of 4,245 square kilometres, bringing the total area under the city's jurisdiction up to over 5,000 square kilometres.

=== Appointed mayor of Miri ===
Since 2005, the city has been led by three mayors. The previous mayors are listed as below:

No	Mayor	Term start	Term end
1	Wee Han Wen	20 May 2005	22 January 2010
2	Lawrence Lai Yew Son	23 January 2010	30 June 2016
3	Adam Yii Siew Sang	1 July 2016	Incumbent

== Current appointed councillors ==
1. Robert Ayu
2. Jeffery Phang Siaw Foong
3. Ernest Goh Khiok Seng
4. Mohamad Sardon Zainal
5. Peter Chia Chhau Khiong
6. Kueh Chie Tiong
7. Rexsoll Gilum
8. Gilbert Chin Yung Hua
9. Warziedea Ahmad
10. Lee Thin Hin
11. Abdullah Jaini
12. Ong Chee Yee
13. Joanna Ping Eng Oyok
14. Yap Siew Jin
15. Chan Chai Ping
16. Pui Yeong Fan
17. Mathew Benson Mounsey
18. Rantai Achin
19. Leong Chin Lim
20. Ariffin Mohamad
21. Bhagwan Singh
22. Keith Chin Hsiun
23. Karambir Singh Honey
24. Missiah Abdullah @ Emiss Berudi
25. Aping Trang @ Connie Aping
26. Dominica Lucia Tingang
27. Dominic Nyurang Ajang
28. David Stephen
