= Miri District =

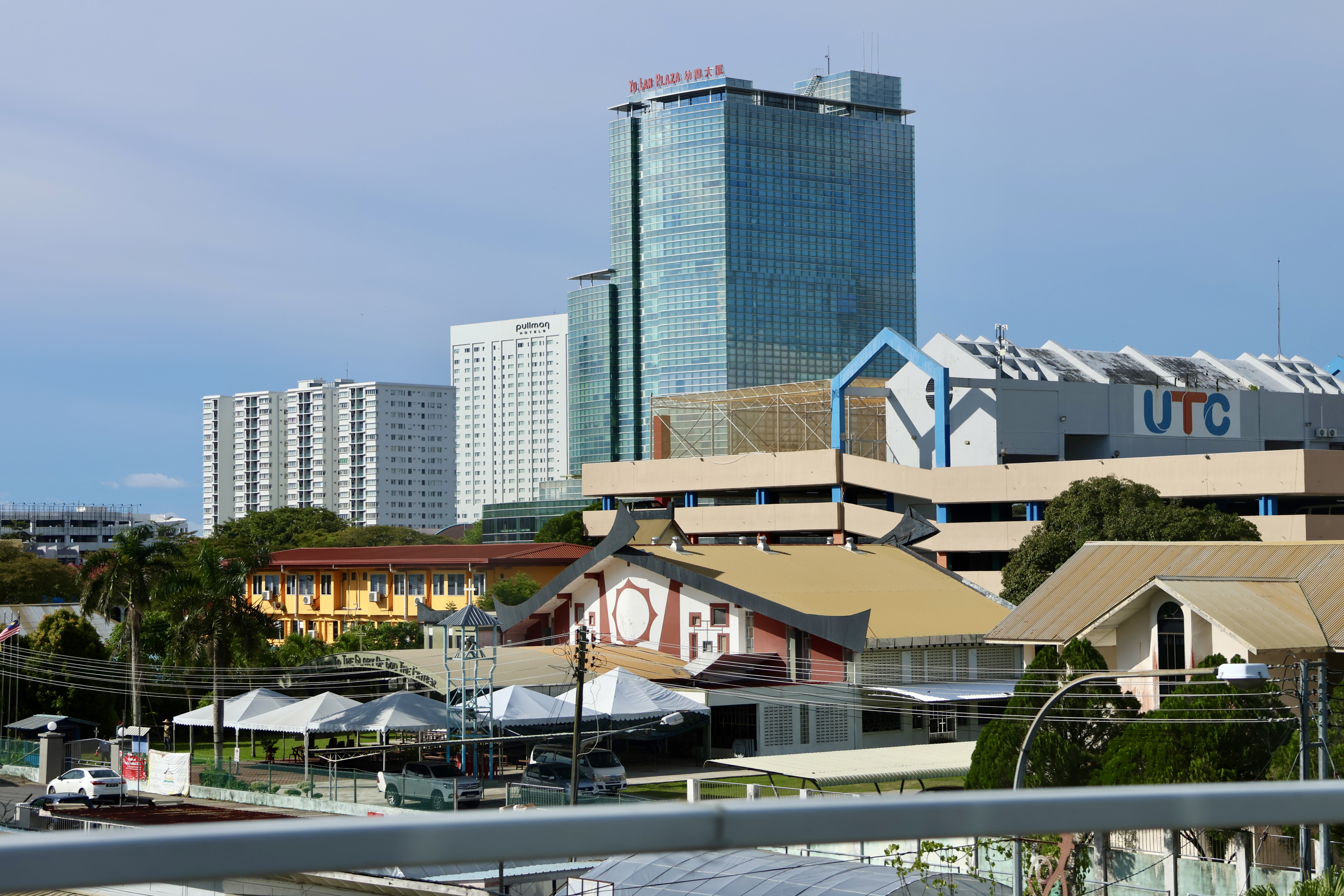
- Miri City

- Districts of Sarawak
- District Office location: Miri
- Local area government(s): Miri City Council (SCC); Subis District Council (SDC)

Area
  - Total: 4,707 km^{2} (1,817 sq mi)

Population (2010)
  - Total: 290,274
  - Density: 61.67/km^{2} (159.7/sq mi)
- District Officer: Boniface Intang Anak Apat
- License plate prefix: QM
- Ethnicity: Iban (29.3%); Chinese (26.8%); Malay (18.2%); Non-Malaysians (9.4%); Melanau (3.1%); Bidayuh (1.3%)
- Website: http://www.miri.sarawak.gov.my/

Map of Miri District

Miri District is an administrative district in Miri Division, Sarawak, Malaysia covering a total area of 4707 km^{2}. The Miri District can be divided into Miri City (997.43 km^{2}), Sibuti sub-district (842.47 km^{2}), and Niah sub-district (2887.21 km^{2}). They are governed by Miri District Office located in Miri City, Sibuti sub-district office, and Niah sub-district office. The Miri City is administered by Miri City Council (MCC). Meanwhile, Niah and Sibuti sub-district falls under the jurisdiction of Subis District Council headquartered at Bekenu.

== Federal Parliament and State Assembly Seats ==
List of Miri district representatives in the Federal Parliament (Dewan Rakyat)

No.	Federal Constituency	Member	Coalition (Party)
P218	Sibuti	Lukanisman Awang Sauni	Gabungan Parti Sarawak (PBB)
P219	Miri	Michael Teo Yu Keng	Pakatan Harapan (PKR)

List of Miri district representatives in the State Legislative Assembly of Sarawak

No.	State Constituency	Member	Coalition (Party)
N72	Lambir	Ripin Lamat	Gabungan Parti Sarawak (PBB)
N73	Piasau	Sebastian Ting Chiew Yew	Gabungan Parti Sarawak (SUPP)
N74	Pujut	Vacant	
N75	Senadin	Lee Kim Shin	Gabungan Parti Sarawak (SUPP)

== Demography ==
There has been a growth of Miri District population of 3.5% from 1991 to 2000. Meanwhile, from 2000 to 2010, there is a population growth of 2.88%.

Year	1991	2000	2010
Total population	161,373	221,055	294,716
