= Long Baleh =

- Location within Borneo
- Coordinates: 3.2741°N 115.4316°E
- Country: Malaysia
- State: Sarawak
- Administrative Division: Marudi
- Elevation: 1,134 m (3,720 ft)

Long Baleh is a settlement in the Marudi division of Sarawak, Malaysia. It lies approximately 597.3 kilometres (371 mi) east-north-east of the state capital Kuching.

Neighbouring settlements include:

- Long Peluan 2.9 kilometres (1.8 mi) southwest
- Lepu Wei 8.1 kilometres (5.0 mi) northeast
- Long Banga 9.8 kilometres (6.1 mi) southwest
- Long Metapa 17.8 kilometres (11.1 mi) southwest
- Lio Matoh 25.1 kilometres (15.6 mi) southwest
- Long Salt 27.5 kilometres (17.1 mi) west
- Ramudu Hulu 31.2 kilometres (19.4 mi) north
- Batu Paton 31.7 kilometres (19.7 mi) northeast
- Long Tungan 33.3 kilometres (20.7 mi) southwest
- Pa Dali 33.4 kilometres (20.8 mi) northeast
