= Long Puak =

- Location within Borneo
- Coordinates: 3.81667°N 114.43333°E
- Country: Malaysia
- State: Sarawak
- Administrative Division: Marudi
- Elevation: 152 m (499 ft)

Long Puak, formerly known as Long Ballong, is a small-village found about 2 km from Long Banga in the Marudi division of Sarawak, Malaysia. It lies approximately 519.1 kilometres (323 mi) east-north-east of the state capital Kuching.

== Description ==
It is believed that the population is less than 50 people, with majority of the inhabitants being Sabans, along with Kelabit and Kenyah people. The village's main activities are agriculture-based activities like planting paddy, fruits, raising chickens, pigs, buffalo and cows, and fishing.

The village is very quiet; most of the younger generation have gone to urban areas like Miri and Marudi in search of better living and employment opportunities. Some have also gone to nearby logging camps to work as woodmen, mechanics and other timber-related jobs.

== Education ==
Most of the children in the village will be sent to Long Banga for primary education; for secondary school, they will be sent to Bario.

== Neighbouring settlements ==
Neighbouring settlements include:

- Batu Gading 2.6 kilometres (1.6 mi) southeast
- Long Banio 4.1 kilometres (2.5 mi) northeast
- Rumah Banyi 6.7 kilometres (4.2 mi) northwest
- Long Lama 6.7 kilometres (4.2 mi) southwest
- Long Laput 9.1 kilometres (5.7 mi) south
- Long Puak, now abandoned due to geography
- Rumah Antau 9.3 kilometres (5.8 mi) northwest
- Rumah Jaliang 9.3 kilometres (5.8 mi) north
- Lirong Kawit 9.6 kilometres (6.0 mi) south
- Rumah Jelian 11.3 kilometres (7.0 mi) west
- Long Ekang 11.3 kilometres (7.0 mi) north
