= Long Peluan =

- Location within Borneo
- Coordinates: 3.2614°N 115.4083°E
- Country: Malaysia
- State: Sarawak
- Administrative Division: Marudi
- Elevation: 1,125 m (3,691 ft)

Long Peluan is a settlement in the Marudi division of Sarawak, Malaysia. It lies approximately 594.4 kilometres (369 mi) east-north-east of the state capital Kuching.

The village is located in the Ulu Baram area in the interior of Sarawak. The nearby village of Long Banga is about four hour’ walk away, and has an airport and a clinic that serves the surrounding villages including Long Peluan. A logging road now links Long Peluan with Long Banga, Merawa Camp, and other villages downstream.

The village is on the outer limits of Kelabit territory and the people are predominantly Kelabits, though some members of the related Sa'ban tribe also live in Long Peluan.

Neighbouring settlements include:

- Long Baleh 2.9 kilometres (1.8 mi) northeast
- Long Banga 7.4 kilometres (4.6 mi) south
- Lepu Wei 10.9 kilometres (6.8 mi) northeast
- Long Metapa 14.8 kilometres (9.2 mi) southwest
- Lio Matoh 22.1 kilometres (13.7 mi) southwest
- Long Salt 25.1 kilometres (15.6 mi) west
- Long Tungan 30.4 kilometres (18.9 mi) southwest
- Ramudu Hulu 33.2 kilometres (20.6 mi) north
- Long Lellang 33.4 kilometres (20.8 mi) northwest
- Aro Kangan 33.6 kilometres (20.9 mi) northwest
