= Aro Kangan =

- Location within Borneo
- Coordinates: 3.48475°N 115.20446°E
- Country: Malaysia
- State: Sarawak
- Elevation: 1,021 m (3,350 ft)

Aro Kangan is a settlement in the remote mountainous interior of Sarawak, Malaysia. It lies approximately 581.4 kilometres (361 mi) east-north-east of the state capital Kuching.

To reach Aro Kangan from the coastal city of Miri the journey involves a one-hour flight to Long Lellang Airport, followed by a four-hour walk through the jungle from Long Lellang to Aro Kangan.

Neighbouring settlements include:

- Long Lellang 3.9 kilometres (2.4 mi) southwest
- Long Datih 5.7 kilometres (3.5 mi) southwest
- Long Labid 7.9 kilometres (4.9 mi) northeast
- Long Merigong 17.3 kilometres (10.7 mi) west
- Long Salt 20.2 kilometres (12.6 mi) south
- Long Aar 21.4 kilometres (13.3 mi) north
- Pa Tik 27.9 kilometres (17.3 mi) north
- Long Seniai 28.5 kilometres (17.7 mi) west
- Ramudu Hulu 31.8 kilometres (19.8 mi) east
- Kubaan 33.1 kilometres (20.6 mi) north
