= Lio Matoh =

- Location within Borneo
- Coordinates: 3.16667°N 115.23333°E
- Country: Malaysia
- State: Sarawak
- Administrative Division: Marudi
- Elevation: 1,802 m (5,912 ft)

Lio Matoh (also known as Lio Matu) is a remote Kenyah Badeng longhouse settlement in the mountainous interior of the Marudi division of Sarawak, Malaysia, not far from the border with Indonesia. It lies approximately 572.6 kilometres (356 mi) east-north-east of the state capital Kuching.

Travel to Lio Matoh involves a four-hour 4WD drive from Long San, or it is possible to trek between Lio Matoh and Bario, but it takes seven to nine days. The Baram River begins as a stream near Bario, and it flows through Lio Matoh, the highest that small boats can navigate. It is possible to travel downriver from Lio Matoh by longboat: it takes two days to get to Long San by this method.

Neighbouring settlements include:

- Long Metapa 7.6 kilometres (4.7 mi) east
- Long Tungan 8.3 kilometres (5.2 mi) southwest
- Long Sait 16.2 kilometres (10.1 mi) north
- Long Banga 17.1 kilometres (10.6 mi) east
- Long Selaan 19.1 kilometres (11.9 mi) southwest
- Long Moh 21.6 kilometres (13.4 mi) southwest
- Long Peluan 22.1 kilometres (13.7 mi) northeast
- Long Baleh 25.1 kilometres (15.6 mi) northeast
- Long Datih 32.4 kilometres (20.1 mi) north
- Lepu Wei 32.8 kilometres (20.4 mi) northeast
- Long Pasia in Sabah.
- Long Mio in Sabah.
