= Pelophryne ingeri =

Scientific classification
- Kingdom: Animalia
- Phylum: Chordata
- Class: Amphibia
- Order: Anura
- Family: Bufonidae
- Genus: Pelophryne
- Species: P. ingeri

Binomial name
- Pelophryne ingeri Matsui, 2019

Species of amphibian

Pelophryne ingeri is a species of toad in the family Bufonidae. It is found in the Peninsular Malaysia, Singapore, the Tioman Island (Malaysia), Sumatra (Indonesia), and possibly the Natuna and Mentawai Islands (Indonesia). In the past it has been confused with Pelophryne signata and P. brevipes.

== Etymology ==
Pelophryne ingeri is dedicated to the late Robert F. Inger, an American herpetologist who was Emeritus Curator at the Field Museum of Natural History, for his "great contributions to Southeast Asian herpetology, including taxonomy of Pelophryne".

== Description ==
The type series consists of two adult males that measure 16.3 and 17 mm (0.6 and 0.7 in) in snout–vent length. A female has been reported to measure 18.8 mm (0.7 in) in snout–vent length. The overall appearance is slender. The head is depressed, slightly longer than it is wide. The snout is truncate. The tympanum is oval and conspicuous. The forelimbs are thin and long; the hindlimbs are slender and moderately long. The fingers and the toes have fleshy webbing. The finger tips are expanded into small discs. The dorsum is scattered with small and large, round tubercles. Coloration is dorsally clay brown, with light cruciform pattern outlined in dark brown. The head has a dark brown interorbital bar. A wide blackish brown band runs from the eye, surrounding the tympanum, and above the arm insertion to the groin. Another brown band, bordered below by a creamy yellow streak, runs from below the eye and the tympanum backwards to the groin, merging on the flank with creamy venter; the venter has irregular dark brown markings. Limbs have irregular dark crossbars dorsally. The throat and chest are creamy brown with light brown mottling. The iris is orange-red.

The male advertisement call consists of ticking notes, emitted either continuously or in very long series. In the latter case, notes last about 0.4 seconds and are emitted at intervals of 5–6 seconds. The dominant frequency is 6.6–6.75 kHz.

== Habitat and ecology ==
Pelophryne ingeri occurs in primary forest at elevations of 240–880 m (800–2,900 ft) above sea level. Specimens have been found some 0.6–1.5 m (2–5 ft) above ground on vegetation and tree stumps. The tadpoles are endotrophic and have been found both on the forest floor and on vegetation.
