= Idris Jala =

Malaysian politician and technocrat

Yang Berbahagia Dato' Sri Idris Jala PJN SSAP PGBK
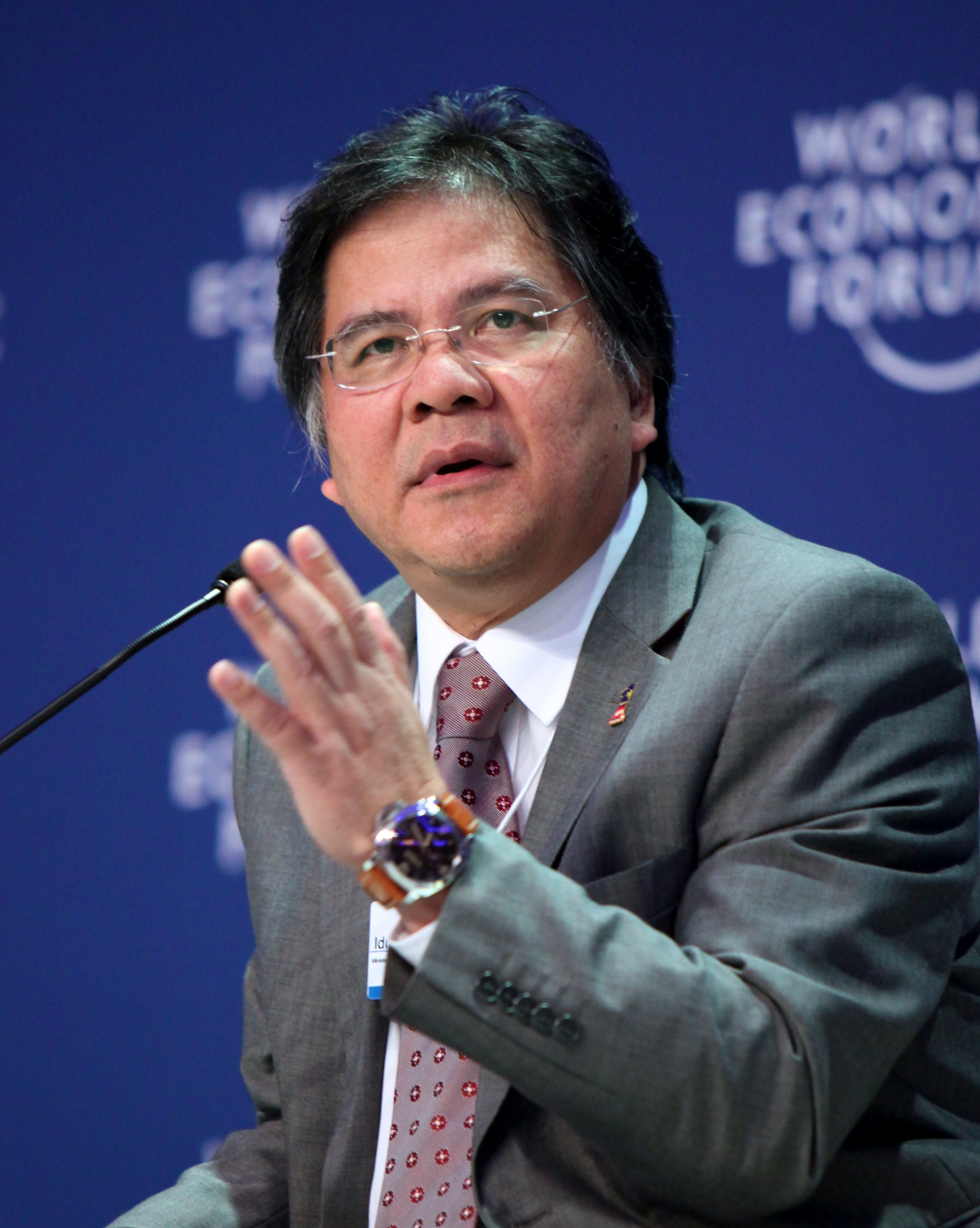
- Idris Jala at the World Economic Forum on East Asia in 2012.

Ministerial roles
- 2009–2015: Minister in the Prime Minister's Department

Faction represented in Dewan Negara
- 2009–2015: Independent

Personal details
- Born: 21 August 1958 (age 68) Bario, Crown Colony of Sarawak (now Sarawak, Malaysia)
- Citizenship: Malaysian
- Party: Independent
- Spouse: Pang Ngan Yue (m. 1988)
- Children: 2
- Education: Universiti Sains Malaysia; Warwick University
- Occupation: Politician, technocrat
- Website: idrisjala.my

Idris Jala (born 21 August 1958) is a Malaysian politician and technocrat. He served as the Minister in the Prime Minister's Department and as the chief executive officer of the Performance Management and Delivery Unit (Pemandu) from 2009 until 2015, the unit tasked with spearheading Malaysia's transition towards high income status by 2020. He was also a Senator in the Dewan Negara from 2009 till 2015. At present, he is the president and CEO of PEMANDU Associates, a global consultancy firm focused on public sector transformation and business turnaround.

== Career ==
Prior to his government stint, Idris used to work for Shell where he spent 23 years there. In 2005, the Malaysian government elected him as CEO of Malaysia Airlines due to massive losses of the company. In February 2006, he announced the airline's business turnaround plan from a 9-month loss of US$400 million in 2005 to achieving a record profit of US$260 million in 2007. He served until August 2009 after successfully turning around MAS and was awarded the CAPA Airline Turnaround of the Year (2006). He was also voted as a Governor on the Board of IATA (International Air Transport Association) in 2006.

=== Cabinet minister ===
In September 2009, Idris was sworn in as a Minister in the Prime Minister's Department. He was appointed minister without portfolio in the Prime Minister's Department and chief executive officer of the now-defunct Performance Management and Delivery Unit (Pemandu). As the CEO of Pemandu, the unit monitoring the implementation of the Key Performance Indicator (KPI) initiative, he assisted and reported to Koh Tsu Koon, the minister in the Prime Minister's Department who is responsible for national unity and performance management. Idris was the first Orang Ulu to be appointed as a federal cabinet minister.

== Personal life ==
Idris was born and raised in Bario located in the Kelabit Highlands region of Sarawak's northern Miri Division, but owns residences in the state capital of Kuching (where his immediate family resides), the second-largest city of Miri (since his extended family and relatives on both sides from the Kelabit Higlands reside for residential domicile purposes) as well as the national capital of Kuala Lumpur, for where he resides with his wife and children as a result of his corporate and political career. He is the third of four children born to Henry Jala Temalai (1931–2016) and Lapu Sakai @ Midang Aren (1936–2023), for he has an elder brother named Rubin (born 1954), followed by an elder sister, Datin Garnette Jala-Ridu (born 1956), the spouse of former Sarawak State Legislative Assembly speaker of Bidayuh descent, Dato Robert Jacob Ridu (born 1949), then followed by a younger sister, Elizabeth Jala-Bato (born 1964). His father, who was a former Kelabit Highland pemanca (tribal chief) cum retired schoolteacher since 1989, died on 22 March 2016, aged 85, whilst his mother, died in September 2023, aged 87.

Idris is a Kelabit from Sarawak and is a Christian belongs to the Sidang Injil Borneo denomination of Protestantism. He is married to Pang Ngan Yue and has two sons, Leon and Max. He is one of the few non-Malay non-Muslims to have been appointed to head a GLC. Since March 2024, Idris and his son, Leon holds a weekly podcast called The Game of Impossible.

== Honours ==
=== Honours of Malaysia ===
- Malaysia
  - Commander of the Order of Meritorious Service (PJN) – Datuk (2007)
- Pahang
  - Knight Grand Companion of the Order of Sultan Ahmad Shah of Pahang (SSAP) – Dato' Sri (2007)
- Sarawak
  - Commander of the Order of the Star of Hornbill Sarawak (PGBK) – Datuk (2007)
