= Pelophryne penrissenensis =

Conservation status
- Least Concern (IUCN 3.1)

Scientific classification
- Kingdom: Animalia
- Phylum: Chordata
- Class: Amphibia
- Order: Anura
- Family: Bufonidae
- Genus: Pelophryne
- Species: P. penrissenensis

Binomial name
- Pelophryne penrissenensis Matsui, Nishikawa, Eto, and Hossman, 2017

Species of amphibian

Pelophryne penrissenensis, also known as Penrissen dwarf toad, is a species of toad in the family Bufonidae. It is endemic to Borneo and only known from Mount Penrissen in Sarawak (East Malaysia), its type locality that also gave this species its specific name. Its actual range might be wider and extend into nearby Kalimantan (Indonesia). It is the sister taxon of Pelophryne signata.

== Description ==
Two adult males in the type series measure 25–28 mm (1.0–1.1 in) and a single adult female 31 mm (1.2 in) in snout–vent length. The overall appearance is moderately slender. The snout is truncate. The tympanum is visible, oval in shape. The forelimbs are thin and long; the hindlimbs are slender and moderately long. Both the fingers and toes have fleshy webbing characteristic to all Pelophryne. The finger and toe tips bear small discs. Skin is dorsally and laterally scattered with tubercles of various sizes. Colouration is clay brown, with darker spots. There is a dark brown interorbital triangle and a dark brown triangle from the mid-trunk to above the cloaca; together, these form a light hourglass pattern. In some individuals, the dark dorsal pattern is reduced into scattered dots.

== Habitat and conservation ==
Pelophryne penrissenensis occurs in primary, hilly lower montane tropical rainforest at elevations of 1,000–1,200 m (3,300–3,900 ft) above sea level. Specimens have been spotted on leaves, on and around rocks, always <2 metres (7 ft) above ground. It probably breeds by larval development, as other Pelophryne. It is sympatric with Pelophryne signata, but less abundant.

Although this species is only known from one locality, it is relatively common there, not facing known threats, and believed to have a stable population. Some habitat conversion has occurred at the lower end of its altitudinal range, but higher up its habitat is considered safe. Hence, it has been assessed as a species of "least concern" by IUCN. Mount Penrissen is an Important Bird Area but enjoys no formal protection.
