= Long Banga =

- Location within Borneo
- Coordinates: 3.2°N 115.38333°E
- Country: Malaysia
- State: Sarawak
- Administrative Division: Marudi
- Elevation: 1,298 m (4,259 ft)

Long Banga is a rural village located in Marudi District, Sarawak, Malaysia. It lies approximately 589.6 kilometres (366 mi) east-north-east of the state capital Kuching. The name of "Long Banga" originated from a small river near the site of the village.

== History ==
The village is said to date back to about 1900 and was founded by a group of saban people, though some dispute this account. They converted from pagan beliefs to Christianity in the 1960s.

The village was used as a base by the Allied Army during the Confrontation in the mid-1960s.

The Prime Minister of Malaysia, Dato' Seri Najib visited Long Banga on 22 July 2010 and announced a long-overdue road, a mini dam and a mobile medical clinic, as well as a plan to survey native lands to give indigenous people ownership of their ancestral territory.

== Geography ==
Kampung Long Banga is actually two villages: one is predominantly Saban people and the other is Kenyah Leppo' Ke people. The village is located quite close to the international border (Batu Kallong) between Indonesian Kalimantan and Sarawak. The area is on the upper reaches of the Baram River. The village is about one hour walk from Long Peluan and two day walk from Lio Matoh.

== Neighbouring settlements ==
Neighbouring settlements include:

- Long Peluan 7.4 kilometres (4.6 mi) north
- Long Metapa 9.4 kilometres (5.8 mi) west
- Long Baleh 9.8 kilometres (6.1 mi) northeast
- Lio Matoh 17.1 kilometres (10.6 mi) west
- Lepu Wei 17.9 kilometres (11.1 mi) northeast
- Long Salt 24.8 kilometres (15.4 mi) northwest
- Long Tungan 25.2 kilometres (15.7 mi) west
- Long Selaan 35.8 kilometres (22.2 mi) west
- Long Lellang 36.5 kilometres (22.7 mi) northwest
- Long Datih 36.8 kilometres (22.9 mi) northwest
- Long Pasia in Sabah
- Long mio in Sabah

== Transportation ==
Before the mid 1980s travel to the village was predominantly by river, but in the late 1980s and early 1990s, this isolated place could be reached by small aircraft like the DHC-6 Twin Otter and helicopter. Now it is also accessible by timber or logging road from Merawa Camp. There are also scheduled flights by Malaysia Airlines to Miri and Marudi.

== Infrastructure ==
Currently, the village has one primary school (SK Long Banga), a clinic, an airport (Long Banga Airport) and a church.
