= Batu Lawi Hill =

Mountain in Malaysia

Coordinates: 3°52′N 115°23′E

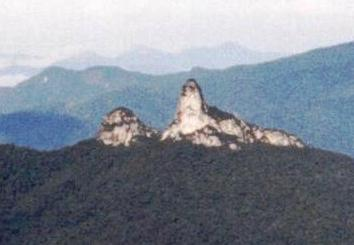
- Batu Lawi, seen from the peak of Mount Murud on 4 September 1998

Highest point
- Elevation: 2,046 m (6,713 ft)
- Prominence: 773 m (2,536 ft)

Naming
- Native name: Bukit Batu Lawi (Malay)

Geography
- Location: Sarawak, Borneo
- Parent range: Kelabit Highlands

Batu Lawi is a twin-peaked mountain in the Kelabit Highlands of Sarawak, Malaysia (Borneo) that has played important roles in both ancient mythology and modern history. The taller 'male' peak is 2046 metres above sea level, while the female summit is at 1850 metres. It is one of the highest mountains in the state of Sarawak.

== History ==
Batu Lawi is sacred to many of the people who live in the region, such as the Kelabit and the Penan. According to the legends of the Kelabit people, the mountain's peaks are a husband and wife—a pair of protector gods that are the parents of all highland peoples. There was a time when a mountain of fire called Batu Apoi tried to burn all living things. But then Batu Lawi fought back to defeat it and Batu Apoi's flames died out. Kelabit people would traditionally visit Batu Lawi on pilgrimages from settlements such as Bario or Ba Kelalan—about a two-day walk through forest that is now part of Pulong Tau National Park. According to their customs, from the moment they first set eyes on the mountain to the moment they stand at its base, they must not utter the mountain's name for fear of antagonising the spirits on the summits. There have been regular sightings of flames bursting out spontaneously on the male peak, where Charles Hose, a naturalist and an administrator served under Brooke regime also witnessed this phenomenon. He reasoned that the bleached surface of the limestone acted as a magnifying glass, causing dry grass to catch fire.

=== Brooke administration ===
Sir Spenser St. John, the British Consul in Brunei, together with his team, went up the Limbang River to reach 15 miles north-east of Batu Lawi in 1858.

R. S. Douglas, in the Sarawak Gazette published in 1900, mentioned that he and his team climbed to Pong Pawan at 5,000 feet high, where he could locate the Limbang River and Batu Lawi in the northern direction.

John Coney Moulton, the curator of the Sarawak State Museum, together with his team, reached Batu Lawi at an altitude of 3,740 feet on 29 May 1911.

=== Japanese occupation ===
In World War II, the twin peaks of Batu Lawi served as an important landmark to pilots in the Royal Australian Air Force (RAAF), during Allied missions to help recapture northern Borneo from Japan, which had invaded and occupied the region in 1941. The Allied response was to send commandos behind the Japanese lines to train the indigenous communities as part of the Z Special Unit to resist the Japanese invasion. One of those to parachute in was Tom Harrisson, the British scientist, journalist and founder of Mass Observation, who was then a second lieutenant in the British Army.

In those days, the maps of Borneo were of a very poor quality. The pilot Squadron Leader Graham Pockley dfc and bar was leader of the expedition and of the RAAF Consolidated Liberator that carried Harrisson and seven other Z Force operatives behind the Japanese lines would have seen a thick green blanket of tropical forest for miles around. However, the pale sandstone peaks of Batu Lawi stood out like a lighthouse and allowed the commandos to be sure they would land somewhere close to the settlement of Bario, and the Kelabit people they sought. The jump was a success but the plane was shot down on its return to the airbase at Morotai in the Dutch East Indies. Squadron Leader Graham Pockley died after making the successful drop.

=== British crown colony ===
Saddened by the loss of the plane, Tom Harrisson took part in the first successful ascent of the female peak, with Lejau Unad Doolinih and five other Kelabits in 1946. He then placed a commemorative board just below the summit in memory of the lost crew that was shot down on the way back to Morotai.

=== Federation of Malaysia ===
In 1986, the British and Australian soldiers from the 14th/20th King’s Hussars, led by Jonny Beardsall, made the first successful ascent of the male peak, 40 years after the first successful ascent of the female peak.

Among those who have attempted to climb Batu Lawi was Bruno Manser, a Swiss national who lived for several years among the nomadic Penan people in Sarawak. He attempted to climb the mountain in 1988 but failed. In May 2000, he entered Sarawak illegally and told his Penan companions that he planned to climb Batu Lawi for the second time but went missing since then. He was declared legally dead on 10 March 2005.

On 14 August 2007, a team of Malaysian climbers successfully ascended Batu Lawi.

== Biodiversity ==
The vegetation on the female peak of Batu Lawi is classed as mountain heath, with low shrubs of Rhododendron and Callophyllum, ground herbs, ferns, orchids and carnivorous pitcher plants (Nepenthes species) that include Nepenthes lowii. Many of the species present are also found on the summit of Gunung Murud, Sarawak's highest mountain, but are endemic to Borneo—that is, found nowhere else on the planet. Immediately below the female peak is a band of mossy elfin forest and, below that, oak-laurel forest.

A 1998 expedition by members of the Miri branch of the Malaysian Nature Society recorded 67 species of bird, including helmeted hornbill, and 20 species of mammal, including Bornean gibbon and sun bear, in the forest that surrounds Batu Lawi, but the only birds recorded from the summit of Batu Lawi itself were ochraceous bulbul and mountain blackeye. In 1946, Tom Harrisson saw a peregrine falcon on the male peak.

In May 2008 the authorities in Sarawak approved the area around Batu Lawi as an extension to Pulong Tau National Park. This meant all logging there should have ceased, but satellite images taken in May 2009 indicated extensive logging within the Batu Lawi reserve area. The images appeared in a report that the Council on Ethics of Norway’s State Pension Fund published in August 2010.
