= Pelophryne api =

Conservation status
- Near Threatened (IUCN 3.1)

Scientific classification
- Kingdom: Animalia
- Phylum: Chordata
- Class: Amphibia
- Order: Anura
- Family: Bufonidae
- Genus: Pelophryne
- Species: P. api

Binomial name
- Pelophryne api Dring, 1983

Species of amphibian

Pelophryne api, also known as Api dwarf toad, is a species of toad in the family Bufonidae. It is endemic to Borneo and known from Gunung Mulu National Park in northern Sarawak (where its type locality, Mount Api, is located) and from Simpang Kuda in Bau District, western Sarawak. Its genetic divergence from Pelophryne guentheri is relatively low and these species could be conspecific.

== Description ==
Adult males measure 18–22 mm (0.7–0.9 in) and adult females 18–24 mm (0.7–0.9 in) in snout–vent length. The overall appearance is slender. The snout is truncate in dorsal view and obliquely projecting in vertical profile. The tympanum is distinct. The fingers are slender and bear small terminal discs, as do the toe tips. Both fingers and toes have fleshy webbing. Coloration is largely black both dorsally and ventrally. There are some pale markings. The dorsum is covered with small, rounded tubercles.

== Habitat and conservation ==
Pelophryne api occurs in primary lowland and montane rainforest in limestone karst areas at elevations of 65–1,200 m (213–3,937 ft) above sea level. The western Sarawak record is from a secondary forest. Individuals have typically been encountered in low vegetation (0.2–0.5 m (1–2 ft) above the ground) at night. The eggs are deposited in small pools on the forest floor (solution holes in limestone, hollowed dead leaves, logs, or senescent Nepenthes pitchers). The tadpole are non-feeding (endotrophic).

Although the known range of this species is limited, it is abundant and common in suitable habitat in Gunung Mulu National Park. The park is also well protected.
