= Lirong Kawit =

- Location within Borneo
- Coordinates: 3.73°N 114.4325°E
- Country: Malaysia
- State: Sarawak
- Administrative Division: Miri
- Elevation: 233 m (764 ft)

Lirong Kawit is a settlement in the Miri division of Sarawak, Malaysia. It lies approximately 514.5 kilometres (320 mi) east-north-east of the state capital Kuching.

Neighbouring settlements include:

- Long Laput 0.7 kilometres (0.4 mi) northwest
- Long Lama 5.4 kilometres (3.4 mi) northwest
- Batu Gading 8 kilometres (5.0 mi) north
- Long Puak 9.6 kilometres (6.0 mi) north
- Rumah Ingkot 13.3 kilometres (8.3 mi) west
- Long Banio 13.5 kilometres (8.4 mi) north
- Uma Bawang Kanan 13.7 kilometres (8.5 mi) south
- Uma Bawang Kiri 14.3 kilometres (8.9 mi) south
- Rumah Banyi 15.6 kilometres (9.7 mi) north
- Rumah Jelian 15.9 kilometres (9.9 mi) northwest
