= Batu Paton =

- Location within Borneo
- Coordinates: 3.53333°N 115.55°E
- Country: Malaysia
- State: Sarawak
- Elevation: 1,533 m (5,030 ft)

Batu Paton is a settlement in Sarawak, Malaysia. It lies approximately 619.2 kilometres (385 mi) east-north-east of the state capital Kuching.

Neighbouring settlements include:

- Pa Dali 1.9 kilometres (1.2 mi) north
- Long Danau 6.7 kilometres (4.2 mi) northwest
- Pa Bangar 7.4 kilometres (4.6 mi) north
- Ramudu Hulu 7.6 kilometres (4.7 mi) west
- Pa Mada 7.6 kilometres (4.7 mi) north
- Pa Main 11.7 kilometres (7.3 mi) north
- Pa Umor 22.6 kilometres (14.0 mi) north
- Lepu Wei 24.1 kilometres (15.0 mi) south
- Bareo 26.5 kilometres (16.5 mi) northwest
- Pa Lungan 29.7 kilometres (18.5 mi) north
