= Pelophryne murudensis =

Conservation status
- Critically Endangered (IUCN 3.1)

Scientific classification
- Kingdom: Animalia
- Phylum: Chordata
- Class: Amphibia
- Order: Anura
- Family: Bufonidae
- Genus: Pelophryne
- Species: P. murudensis

Binomial name
- Pelophryne murudensis Das, 2008
- Pelophryne murudensis is only known from Mount Murud in Malaysian Borneo

Species of amphibian

Pelophryne murudensis, also known as the Murud dwarf toad, is a species of toad in the family Bufonidae. It is endemic to Mount Murud in Sarawak, Borneo.

== Description ==
Pelophryne murudensis is a comparatively large species within its genus: adult males measure 22–26 mm (0.9–1.0 in) in snout–vent length; females are unknown. The head is wider than it is long. The snout is oblique in lateral view. The tympanum is distinct. Supratympanic fold and parotoid gland are absent. The fingers are short, stout, and extensively webbed. The toes are long and also extensively webbed. The dorsum is predominantly brown. A dusky brown or dark grey-brown preocular stripe runs from the nostrils to the eye, then along postocular region and broadening after the level of tympanum, and continuing along flanks, contrasting with the relatively lighter dorsum. The flanks are cream or greyish-cream. Males have a subgular vocal sac.

The male advertisement call is a continuous trill.

== Habitat and conservation ==
The type series was collected from montane forest at elevations of 2,120 m (6,960 ft) above sea level. The males were found calling from leaves up to three meters above the ground along forest trails. The larval habitat is unknown but could be Nepenthes pitchers.

The type locality is within the Pulong Tau National Park, but habitat loss is occurring within the park. Climate change is also a likely future threat to this species. This species is believed to be endemic to Mount Murud, which implies that its potential range is small, likely less than 5 km^{2}.
