= Pa Bangar =

- Location within Borneo
- Coordinates: 3.6°N 115.55°E
- Country: Malaysia
- State: Sarawak
- Administrative Division: Marudi
- Elevation: 998 m (3,274 ft)

Pa Bangar is a settlement in the Marudi division of Sarawak, Malaysia. It lies approximately 621.9 kilometres (386 mi) east-north-east of the state capital Kuching.

Burial sites near the village include a mass burial (Benatuh Rayeh) consisting of seventeen jars (Balanai), said to be remains of people from Pa Bangar who had died elsewhere, brought back for mass burial; and Benatuh Ra’an Sembariew with thirteen jars and seven stone pillars (Batuh Senuped).

Neighbouring settlements include:

- Pa Mada 1.9 kilometres (1.2 mi) west
- Pa Main 5.2 kilometres (3.2 mi) northwest
- Pa Dali 5.6 kilometres (3.5 mi) south
- Long Danau 6.7 kilometres (4.2 mi) southwest
- Batu Paton 7.4 kilometres (4.6 mi) south
- Ramudu Hulu 9.3 kilometres (5.8 mi) southwest
- Pa Umor 15.3 kilometres (9.5 mi) north
- Bareo 20.1 kilometres (12.5 mi) northwest
- Pa Lungan 22.3 kilometres (13.9 mi) north
- Long Semirang 27.5 kilometres (17.1 mi) northwest
