= Long Labid =

- Location within Borneo
- Coordinates: 3.55°N 115.23333°E
- Country: Malaysia
- State: Sarawak
- Elevation: 670 m (2,200 ft)

Long Labid is a settlement in the mountainous interior of Sarawak, Malaysia. It lies approximately 587.1 kilometres (365 mi) east-north-east of the state capital Kuching.

Neighbouring settlements include:

- Aro Kangan 7.9 kilometres (4.9 mi) southwest
- Long Lellang 11.7 kilometres (7.3 mi) southwest
- Long Datih 13.4 kilometres (8.3 mi) southwest
- Long Aar 13.5 kilometres (8.4 mi) north
- Pa Tik 20 kilometres (12.4 mi) north
- Long Merigong 22.4 kilometres (13.9 mi) southwest
- Kubaan 25.2 kilometres (15.7 mi) north
