= Long Datih =

- Location within Borneo
- Coordinates: 3.45°N 115.16667°E
- Country: Malaysia
- State: Sarawak
- Elevation: 416 m (1,365 ft)

Long Datih is a Christian Kelabit longhouse settlement in the mountainous interior of Sarawak, Malaysia. It lies approximately 576.1 kilometres (358 mi) east-north-east of the state capital Kuching.

The village converted to Christianity in the 1940s; a visitor in 1960 described how, as well as Sunday services in the village chapel, prayers were held in each longhouse at the start of each day.

Neighbouring settlements include:

- Long Lellang 1.9 kilometres (1.2 mi) northeast
- Aro Kangan 5.7 kilometres (3.5 mi) northeast
- Long Merigong 13.1 kilometres (8.1 mi) west
- Long Labid 13.4 kilometres (8.3 mi) northeast
- Long Salt 16.3 kilometres (10.1 mi) south
- Long Seniai 24.1 kilometres (15.0 mi) west
- Long Aar 26.5 kilometres (16.5 mi) northeast
- Lio Matoh 32.4 kilometres (20.1 mi) south
- Pa Tik 33.2 kilometres (20.6 mi) northeast
- Long Metapa 33.2 kilometres (20.6 mi) southeast
