= Pa Dali =

- Location within Borneo
- Coordinates: 3.55°N 115.55°E
- Country: Malaysia
- State: Sarawak
- Administrative Division: Marudi
- Elevation: 1,158 m (3,799 ft)

Pa Dali (also called Pa Dalih) is a Kelabit settlement in the Marudi division of Sarawak, Malaysia. It lies approximately 619.9 kilometres (385 mi) east-north-east of the state capital Kuching, in the Kelabit Highlands.

It lies on the so-called Bario loop, the most popular 3-day trek in the Bario area, which passes through the Kelabit villages of Pa Dalih, Pa Ramadu and Pa Mada, and is described as a friendly and hospitable village.

It was reported in 1974 that an ancient burial ground with stone urns, slab graves and porcelain urns was found at about 3300 feet near Pa Dali. At the time, the village was uninhabited following its evacuation during the Indonesia–Malaysia confrontation of 1962–1966.

Neighbouring settlements include:

- Batu Paton 1.9 kilometres (1.2 mi) south
- Pa Bangar 5.6 kilometres (3.5 mi) north
- Long Danau 5.9 kilometres (3.7 mi) west
- Pa Mada 5.9 kilometres (3.7 mi) north
- Ramudu Hulu 7.4 kilometres (4.6 mi) west
- Pa Main 10 kilometres (6.2 mi) north
- Pa Umor 20.7 kilometres (12.9 mi) north
- Bario 24.9 kilometres (15.5 mi) northwest
- Lepu Wei 25.9 kilometres (16.1 mi) south
- Pa Lungan 27.9 kilometres (17.3 mi) north
