= Long Danau =

- Location within Borneo
- Coordinates: 3.56667°N 115.5°E
- Country: Malaysia
- State: Sarawak
- Administrative Division: Marudi
- Elevation: 961 m (3,153 ft)

Long Danau is a longhouse settlement in the Marudi division of Sarawak, Malaysia. It lies approximately 615.3 kilometres (382 mi) east-north-east of the state capital Kuching.

The longhouse is about three hours' trek from Ramadu. Long Danau has a good reputation with travellers, with good food and a chief who speaks English.

The Bornean Horseshoe Bat (Rhinolophus borneensis) has been observed in Long Danau.

Neighbouring settlements include:

- Ramudu Hulu 2.6 kilometres (1.6 mi) southwest
- Pa Mada 5.2 kilometres (3.2 mi) northeast
- Pa Dali 5.9 kilometres (3.7 mi) east
- Pa Bangar 6.7 kilometres (4.2 mi) northeast
- Batu Paton 6.7 kilometres (4.2 mi) southeast
- Pa Main 7.6 kilometres (4.7 mi) north
- Pa Umor 18.6 kilometres (11.6 mi) north
- Bareo 21.1 kilometres (13.1 mi) north
- Pa Lungan 26.2 kilometres (16.3 mi) north
- Lepu Wei 26.7 kilometres (16.6 mi) south
