= Uma Bawang =

- Village
- Location in Borneo
- Coordinates: 3°36′10.1″N 114°24′25.9″E
- Country: Malaysia
- State: Sarawak
- Division: Miri Division

Population (1990)
  - Total: 100
- Time zone: UTC+8 (MST)
  - Summer (DST): UTC+8 (Not observed)

Uma Bawang is a village located in Lirong Kawit, the settlement in state of Sarawak. This village consists of a single longhouse that located near Baram River and the population is 100 as of 1990 that consists of Kayan people.

== Sister cities ==
As designed by Sister Cities International, Uma Bawang has maintained sister cities with:

- (United States) Berkeley, California, 1991
