= Long Semirang =

- Location within Borneo
- Coordinates: 3.78333°N 115.38333°E
- Country: Malaysia
- State: Sarawak
- Administrative Division: Marudi
- Elevation: 489 m (1,604 ft)

Long Semirang is a settlement in the Marudi division of Sarawak, Malaysia. It lies approximately 612.4 kilometres (381 mi) east-north-east of the state capital Kuching.

About seven Penan families have settled in the nearby village of Lond Medamot and have learnt the skills of rice farming from Kelabits in Long Manau and Long Semirang.

Neighbouring settlements include:

- Bario 8.3 kilometres (5.2 mi) southeast
- Kubaan 9.4 kilometres (5.8 mi) west
- Pa Tik 11.9 kilometres (7.4 mi) southwest
- Pa Umor 15.8 kilometres (9.8 mi) east
- Pa Lungan 16.8 kilometres (10.4 mi) east
- Long Aar 18.3 kilometres (11.4 mi) southwest
- Buyo 21.1 kilometres (13.1 mi) northwest
- Pa Main 22.3 kilometres (13.9 mi) southeast
- Long Rapung 22.4 kilometres (13.9 mi) northeast
- Pa Mada 26.3 kilometres (16.3 mi) southeast
