= Long Laput =

- Location within Borneo
- Coordinates: 3.7348°N 114.428°E
- Country: Malaysia
- State: Sarawak
- Administrative Division: Marudi
- Elevation: 233 m (764 ft)

Population
  - Total: 2,000

Long Laput (also known as Laput) is a settlement in the rural interior of the Marudi district of Sarawak, Malaysia. It lies approximately 514.3 kilometres (320 mi) east-north-east of the state capital Kuching.

== Description ==
Long Laput is one of the biggest villages along the Baram River and the majority of the inhabitants belong to the Kayan tribe. The estimated population is 2000 people, most of whom live in longhouses. In the late 1950s the main longhouse was reputed to be the longest in Borneo, being 700 metres in length. The main source of income is agriculture, including rice, pepper, rubber and increasingly palm oil; one oil palm estate extends to 2500 acres. Livestock include freshwater fish farming and cattle which graze the oil palm plantation.

== Development ==
The history of the village dates back at least to the 1920s, but a significant change started in 1950 with the arrival of the Borneo Evangelical Church, followed by Roman Catholics in 1956. Schools were built in 1956 and a health clinic was opened in the village. The longhouses were constructed from bamboo and thatched with leaves. Unfortunately, a 70-family longhouse was destroyed by fire in 1987. Longhouses are now constructed using bricks, and the village now has modern infrastructure, including running water, electricity, sports facilities, a public library and public telephones. The library also provides internet access, photocopying and scanning. The school, Sekolah Kebangsaan Long Laput, provides education and accommodation for 192 students, with a teaching staff of twelve.

== Threats ==
If the Baram Bam hydroelectric project goes ahead, Long Laput will be one of the villages affected by the flooding of 389,000 hectares of jungle.

== Neighbouring settlements ==
Neighbouring settlements include:

- Lirong Kawit 0.7 kilometres (0.4 mi) southeast
- Long Lama 4.7 kilometres (2.9 mi) northwest
- Batu Gading 7.7 kilometres (4.8 mi) north
- Long Puak 9.1 kilometres (5.7 mi) north
- Rumah Ingkot 12.7 kilometres (7.9 mi) west
- Long Banio 13.1 kilometres (8.1 mi) north
- Uma Bawang Kanan 14.1 kilometres (8.8 mi) south
- Uma Bawang Kiri 14.8 kilometres (9.2 mi) south
- Rumah Banyi 15 kilometres (9.3 mi) north
- Rumah Jelian 15.2 kilometres (9.4 mi) northwest
