= Pelophryne saravacensis =

Conservation status
- Near Threatened (IUCN 3.1)

Scientific classification
- Kingdom: Animalia
- Phylum: Chordata
- Class: Amphibia
- Order: Anura
- Family: Bufonidae
- Genus: Pelophryne
- Species: P. saravacensis

Binomial name
- Pelophryne saravacensis Inger and Stuebing, 2009

Synonyms
- Pelophryne saravacensis Inger and Voris, 2001 – nomen nudum

Species of amphibian

Pelophryne saravacensis, also known as Sarawak dwarf toad, is a species of toad in the family Bufonidae. It is endemic to Borneo and only known from Sarawak (East Malaysia); there are records from at least four localities representing three different divisions (Bintulu, Miri, and Kapit).

== Description ==
Adult males measure 17–20 mm (0.7–0.8 in) and adult females 20 mm (0.8 in) in snout–vent length. The overall appearance is slender. The head is as wide as the body. The snout is truncate with a median projection. The tympanum is visible, oval in shape. Both the fingers and toes have fleshy webbing. The finger and toe tips bear discs (the latter being smaller than the former). The dorsum and flanks bear large, round tubercles. The belly is coarsely granular. Preserved specimens have sandy brown to pale tan dorsal coloration. There is a backward pointing dark interorbital triangle, and in some individuals, a faint dark triangle or trapezoid in the lumbar region. The ventral surfaces are dark brown with small, discrete, white spots. In living individuals, small red spots are often present on the larger dorsal tubercles.

== Habitat and conservation ==
Pelophryne saravacensis inhabits lowland and submontane forests. Males call from understory vegetation and trunks of small trees as high as 5 m (16 ft) above the ground, but preferably 0.5–1.3 m (2–4 ft) above the ground. Other aspects of its breeding biology remain unknown, but it probably breeds in streams, as is the case for other Pelophryne.

The habitat of this species is threatened by logging, leading to a decline in both its extent and quality. Consequently, it is suspected that the overall population of Pelophryne saravacensis is declining. It is present in the Gunung Mulu and Pulong Tau National Parks; while the former is well protected, the latter is not and faces encroachment from logging companies.
