= Long Merigong =

- Location within Borneo
- Coordinates: 3.46667°N 115.05°E
- Country: Malaysia
- State: Sarawak
- Elevation: 198 m (650 ft)

Long Merigong is a settlement in Sarawak, Malaysia. It lies approximately 564.7 kilometres (351 mi) east-north-east of the state capital Kuching.

Neighbouring settlements include:

- Long Seniai 11.3 kilometres (7.0 mi) west
- Long Datih 13.1 kilometres (8.1 mi) east
- Long Lellang 14.6 kilometres (9.1 mi) east
- Aro Kangan 17.3 kilometres (10.7 mi) east
- Long Labid 22.4 kilometres (13.9 mi) northeast
- Long Tebangan 23.2 kilometres (14.4 mi) southwest
- Long Salt 23.6 kilometres (14.7 mi) southeast
- Long Tap 28.3 kilometres (17.6 mi) southwest
- Long Aar 32.8 kilometres (20.4 mi) northeast
- Long Akah 34 kilometres (21.1 mi) southwest
