= Pelophryne linanitensis =

Conservation status
- Critically Endangered (IUCN 3.1)

Scientific classification
- Kingdom: Animalia
- Phylum: Chordata
- Class: Amphibia
- Order: Anura
- Family: Bufonidae
- Genus: Pelophryne
- Species: P. linanitensis

Binomial name
- Pelophryne linanitensis Das, 2008
- Pelophryne linanitensis is only known from the Mount Murud range in Malaysian Borneo

Species of amphibian

Pelophryne linanitensis, also known as the Linanit dwarf toad, is a species of toad in the family Bufonidae. It is endemic to Batu Linanit in Mount Murud in Sarawak, Borneo.

== Description ==
Pelophryne linanitensis is a mid-sized species within its genus: adult males measure 18–19 mm (0.7–0.7 in) in snout–vent length; females are unknown. The head is wider than it is long. The snout is vertical in lateral view. The tympanum is distinct. Supratympanic fold and parotoid gland are absent. The fingers are extremely short and stout, and with extensively webbed. The toes are long and almost fully webbed. The dorsum is predominantly brown and bears an indistinct, lighter brown hour-glass pattern. Males have a subgular vocal sac.

The male advertisement call consists of a metallic "ping" note that is repeated 4–5 times in a call series.

== Habitat and conservation ==
The type series was collected from rhododendron forest at the wind-swept summit of Batu Linanit at 2,250 m (7,380 ft) above sea level. The males were found calling from leaves just 5–15 cm (2.0–5.9 in) above the ground that was covered by deep layer of moss, leave litter, and roots. The larval habitat is unknown but could be Nepenthes pitchers, near which the males were found.

The type locality is within the Pulong Tau National Park, but habitat loss is occurring within the park. Climate change is also a likely future threat to this species. It is likely a summit specialist with very limited range, likely about 1 km².
