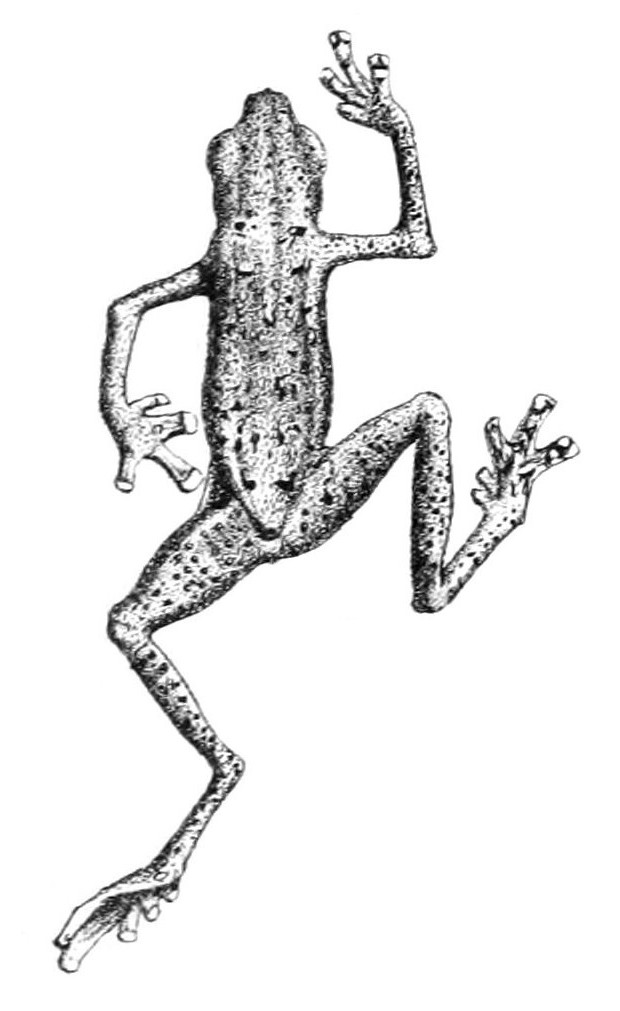
- Pelophryne guentheri

Scientific classification
- Kingdom: Animalia
- Phylum: Chordata
- Class: Amphibia
- Order: Anura
- Family: Bufonidae
- Genus: Pelophryne; Barbour, 1938

Type species
- Pelophryne albotaeniata Barbour, 1938

Species
- 13 species (see text)

= Pelophryne =

Genus of amphibians

Pelophryne, commonly known as flathead toads or dwarf toads, is a genus of true toads, family Bufonidae. The genus occurs in the Philippines, Borneo, Malaya including Singapore, and Hainan (China). Molecular data suggest that Pelophryne is the sister taxon of Ansonia.

== Description and ecology ==
Pelophryne are small, semi-arboreal toads. They can easily be recognized by the peculiar, fleshy web of their fingers and toes. The genus can be divided into two groups: one with rounded but not expanded finger tips, and the other with the tips of the fingers expanded into truncate discs. This morphological division is supported by molecular data.

Where two Pelophryne species coexist, one species is small (<20 mm (0.8 in)) and the other one is larger, about 25–28 mm (1.0–1.1 in) in snout–vent length. This is suggestive of resource partitioning.

The tadpoles are specialized for rapid development in very small rain water pools. The eggs are relatively large, and the tadpoles appear to subsist the larval period on yolk. The tadpoles have a degenerate oral disk and lack a spiracle.

== Species ==
The following species are recognized in the genus Pelophryne:

Binomial name and author	Common name
Pelophryne albotaeniata Barbour, 1938	White-striped flathead toad
Pelophryne api Dring, 1984
Pelophryne brevipes (Peters, 1867)	Zamboanga flathead toad
Pelophryne guentheri (Boulenger, 1882)	Gunther's flathead toad
Pelophryne ingeri Matsui, 2019
Pelophryne lighti (Taylor, 1920)	Mindanao flathead toad
Pelophryne linanitensis Das, 2008
Pelophryne misera (Mocquard, 1890)	Black flathead toad
Pelophryne murudensis Das, 2008
Pelophryne penrissenensis Matsui, Nishikawa, Eto, and Hossman, 2017
Pelophryne rhopophilius Inger and Stuebing, 1996
Pelophryne saravacensis Inger and Stuebing, 2009
Pelophryne signata (Boulenger, 1895)	Saint Andrew's cross toadlet

In addition, the AmphibiaWeb recognizes Pelophryne macrotis as distinct from Pelophryne guentheri.
