= Lepu Wei =

- Location within Borneo
- Coordinates: 3.32779°N 115.48056°E
- Country: Malaysia
- State: Sarawak
- Elevation: 1,471 m (4,826 ft)

Lepu Wei (also known as Leppu Wei) is a settlement in Sarawak, Malaysia. It lies approximately 604.3 kilometres (375 mi) east-north-east of the state capital Kuching.

Neighbouring settlements include:

- Long Baleh 8.1 kilometres (5.0 mi) southwest
- Long Peluan 10.9 kilometres (6.8 mi) southwest
- Long Banga 17.9 kilometres (11.1 mi) southwest
- Batu Paton 24.1 kilometres (15.0 mi) north
- Ramudu Hulu 24.7 kilometres (15.3 mi) north
- Long Metapa 25.7 kilometres (16.0 mi) southwest
- Pa Dali 25.9 kilometres (16.1 mi) north
- Long Danau 26.7 kilometres (16.6 mi) north
- Pa Mada 30.9 kilometres (19.2 mi) north
- Pa Bangar 31.3 kilometres (19.4 mi) north
