= Palawan toadlet =

Conservation status
- Vulnerable (IUCN 3.1)

Scientific classification
- Kingdom: Animalia
- Phylum: Chordata
- Class: Amphibia
- Order: Anura
- Family: Bufonidae
- Genus: Pelophryne
- Species: P. albotaeniata

Binomial name
- Pelophryne albotaeniata Barbour, 1938

Species of amphibian

The Palawan toadlet or white-striped flathead toad (Pelophryne albotaeniata) is a species of toad in the family Bufonidae. It is endemic to Palawan, the Philippines.

Pelophryne albotaeniata is similar to Pelophryne misera from Borneo, and it might be subspecies of the latter.

== Description ==
Pelophryne albotaeniata is small, moderately slender-bodied bufonid. Males measure 18–20 mm (0.71–0.79 in) and females 19–23 mm (0.75–0.91 in) in snout–vent length. There are no parotoids or cranial crests. Tympanum is distinct. Dorsal skin has irregularly distributed tubercles interspersed with small spinules. The throat is uniform cream.

== Habitat and conservation ==
The species' natural habitats are montane and lowland forests near streams. It is threatened by habitat loss.

Pelophryne albotaeniata is a rare species. It had only been seen once in the 40 years before its rediscovery during a biodiversity survey carried out in late 2014 and early 2015. The survey was part of a project to create a new reserve called Cleopatra's Needle Forest Reserve.
