= Long Metapa =

- Location within Borneo
- Coordinates: 3.18333°N 115.3°E
- Country: Malaysia
- State: Sarawak
- Elevation: 1,421 m (4,662 ft)

Long Metapa (also known as Long Mentepah) is a settlement in Sarawak, Malaysia. It lies approximately 580.2 kilometres (361 mi) east-north-east of the state capital Kuching.

It is described in one source as a jungle shelter. The Samling Company had a logging camp in Long Metapa in 1994.

Neighbouring settlements include:

- Lio Matoh 7.6 kilometres (4.7 mi) west
- Long Banga 9.4 kilometres (5.8 mi) east
- Long Peluan 14.8 kilometres (9.2 mi) northeast
- Long Tungan 15.8 kilometres (9.8 mi) west
- Long Baleh 17.8 kilometres (11.1 mi) northeast
- Long Sait 18.5 kilometres (11.5 mi) northwest
- Lepu Wei 25.7 kilometres (16.0 mi) northeast
- Long Selaan 26.5 kilometres (16.5 mi) southwest
- Long Moh 29 kilometres (18.0 mi) southwest
- Long Datih 33.2 kilometres (20.6 mi) northwest
- Long Pasia in sabah
- long mio in sabah

== Population dynamics ==
The dense isolated Borneo rainforest of Long Metapa has once provided a haven for the Penan and other indigenous populations. The settlement is strategically located along riverine and forest pathways. The indigenous communities have been working with NGOs to protect against deforestation from Timber mining companies.

The Penan’s indigenous practices, such as blowpipe hunting, using chemistry for fishing and crafting, remain integral to the community’s identity, though modernization and external influences have introduced challenges to preserving these customs
