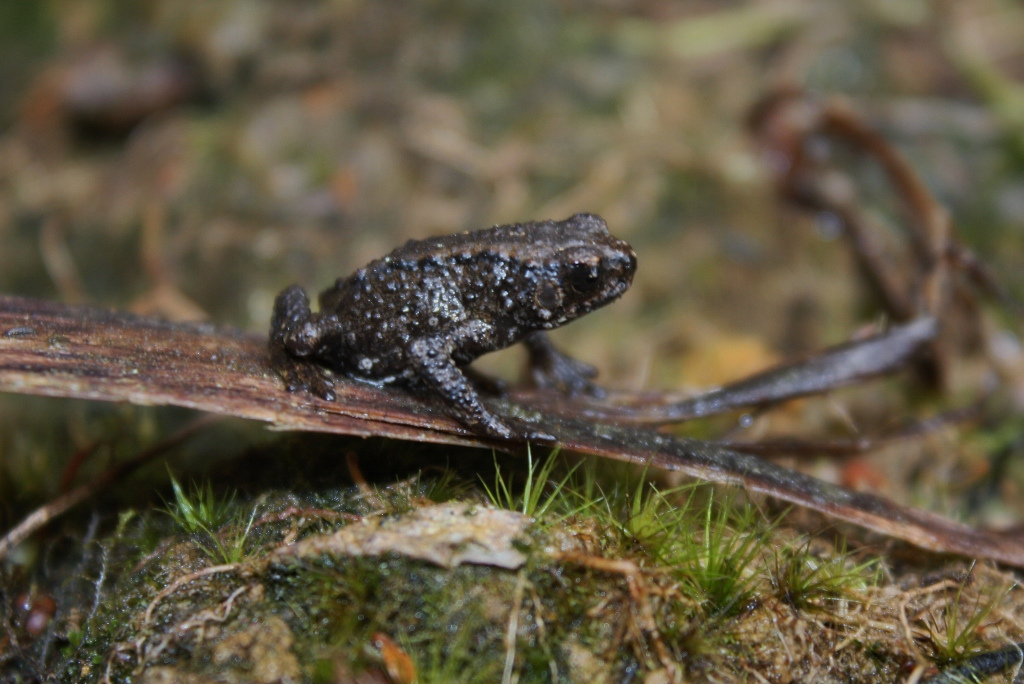

Conservation status
- Least Concern (IUCN 3.1)

Scientific classification
- Kingdom: Animalia
- Phylum: Chordata
- Class: Amphibia
- Order: Anura
- Family: Bufonidae
- Genus: Pelophryne
- Species: P. misera

Binomial name
- Pelophryne misera (Mocquard, 1890)

Synonyms
- Nectophryne misera Mocquard, 1890

= Pelophryne misera =

Species of amphibian

Pelophryne misera, the black flathead toad or Kinabalu dwarf toad, is a species of toad in the family Bufonidae. It is endemic to northwestern Borneo and known from Sabah and Sarawak (Malaysia), although its distribution is likely to be broader and might extend to Kalimantan (Indonesia). It was first described from specimens collected from Mount Kinabalu.

Palawan toadlet Pelophryne albotaeniata from Palawan, the Philippines, is morphologically similar to Pelophryne misera and might be its subspecies.

== Description ==
Pelophryne misera are small, stout toads. Males measure 16–21 mm (0.63–0.83 in) and females 18–23 mm (0.71–0.91 in) in snout–vent length. Colouration is dark brown, with blackish markings on the head, back, and flanks. The snout is blunt and has truncated vertical profile. The skin has warts. Hands and feet have fleshy webbing, reaching the tips of the first three fingers in the hands.

Pelophryne misera are sexually dimorphic: males have a median subgular vocal sac, a row of yellow or brown spinules under the mandible, and a yellow or brown nuptial pad on the first finger. They also have minute spinules distributed over their whole dorsum.

== Reproduction ==
Males are calling from shrubs up to 50 cm (20 in) above the ground. Eggs are laid in small water-filled terrestrial depressions or water-filled leaf-cups of pitcher plants. Based on just one clutch, there are about 10 eggs measuring 2.8 mm (0.11 in) in diameter; low fecundity is typical for the genus. Eggs hatch into tadpoles after 16 days and metamorphose after 44 days. Tadpoles are endotrophic (developing without external food sources).

== Habitat and conservation ==
Natural habitats of Pelophryne misera are montane elfin forests above 1,500 m (4,900 ft) asl. Adult toads are largely terrestrial and live in leaf-litter, rock crevices, and holes in the ground.

Pelophryne misera is threatened by habitat loss caused by logging, although this mainly takes place at lower altitudes. Infrastructure development for tourism is also a potential threat. The species occurs in the Kinabalu Park.
