= Sa'ban people =

Ethnic group

Sa'ban people Sa'baan / Saban
Total population
- approx. 2,700

Regions with significant populations
- Borneo
- Malaysia (Sarawak): 1,600
- Indonesia (East Kalimantan): 1,100

Languages
- Sa'ban language, Malay language (Sarawakian Malay), Indonesian language

Religion
- Christianity (predominantly), Animism

Related ethnic groups
- Other Apo Duat peoples (Kelabit, Kiput, Berawan, Lun Bawang), Other Orang Ulu peoples

The Sa'ban people (also spelled Sa'baan or Saban) are an indigenous ethnic group native to Sarawak, Malaysia and North Kalimantan, Indonesia. In Malaysia, they are classified as part of the Orang Ulu group.

With fewer than 3,000 people, the Sa'ban are one of the smallest indigenous groups in Malaysia and Indonesia. In recent years, many have migrated to urban areas such as Miri (Malaysia), Malinau and Tarakan (Indonesia) in pursuit of better employment and living conditions. However, some still reside in their ancestral villages, including Long Banga, Long Puak (formerly Long Ballong) and Long Peluan in Sarawak. In North Kalimantan, they are primarily concentrated in Desa Tang Paye, a village located in the hilly region of Krayan Tengah District.

The Sa'ban share close cultural and linguistic ties with the Kelabit people. Dialectometric analysis indicates that the Sa'ban language exhibits a 93%–100% lexical difference from neighboring languages, including Abai, Bulungan, Kenyah, Lundayeh, Tenggalan, Tidung and Punan Pakin.

== Language ==
Some simple phrases in Sa'ban:

Phrase	Pronunciation	English translation
Eek	egg	I, Me
Ceh		You
Mai pah ceh	my pah ceh	Where are you going
Mau		Yes
Am	arm	No
Non		What
