= Long Banio =

Long Banyok
- Location within Borneo
- Coordinates: 3.85°N 114.45°E
- Country: Malaysia
- State: Sarawak
- Administrative Division: Marudi
- Elevation: 158 m (518 ft)

Long Banio (also known as Long Banyo, Long Banto or Long Banci) is a large longhouse village in the Marudi division of Sarawak, Malaysia. It lies approximately 522.5 kilometres (325 mi) east-north-east of the state capital Kuching.

The village people are Ngurik Kenyahs.

Neighbouring settlements include:

- Long Puak 4.1 kilometres (2.5 mi) southwest
- Batu Gading 5.6 kilometres (3.5 mi) south
- Rumah Banyi 5.9 kilometres (3.7 mi) west
- Rumah Jaliang 5.9 kilometres (3.7 mi) north
- Long Ekang 7.4 kilometres (4.6 mi) north
- Rumah Antau 9.4 kilometres (5.8 mi) west
- Long Lama 10.8 kilometres (6.7 mi) southwest
- Rumah Mawat 11.9 kilometres (7.4 mi) northwest
- Long Laput 13.1 kilometres (8.1 mi) south
- Rumah Jelian 13.1 kilometres (8.1 mi) west
