= Kubaan =

- Location within Borneo
- Coordinates: 3.76667°N 115.3°E
- Country: Malaysia
- State: Sarawak
- Elevation: 484 m (1,588 ft)

Kubaan is a settlement in the mountainous interior of Sarawak, Malaysia, about two days' walk from Bario. It lies approximately 603.2 kilometres (374.8 mi) east-northeast of the state capital Kuching. Neighbouring settlements include:

- Pa Tik 5.6 kilometres (3.5 mi) south
- Long Semirang 9.4 kilometres (5.8 mi) east
- Long Aar 11.7 kilometres (7.3 mi) south
- Buyo 16.6 kilometres (10.3 mi) northwest
- Bario 16.8 kilometres (10.4 mi) east
- Pa Umor 24.3 kilometres (15.1 mi) east
