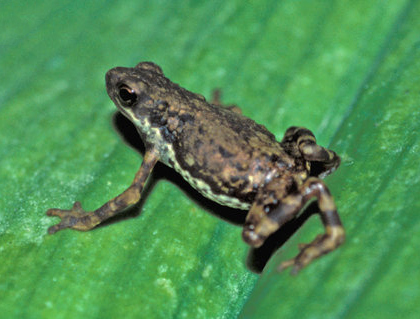

Conservation status
- Least Concern (IUCN 3.1)

Scientific classification
- Kingdom: Animalia
- Phylum: Chordata
- Class: Amphibia
- Order: Anura
- Family: Bufonidae
- Genus: Pelophryne
- Species: P. lighti

Binomial name
- Pelophryne lighti (Taylor, 1920)

Synonyms
- Nectophryne lighti Taylor, 1920

= Pelophryne lighti =

Species of amphibian

Pelophryne lighti, also known as the Mindanao flathead toad or eastern Mindanao dwarf toad, is a species of toad in the family Bufonidae. It is endemic to the Philippines.

== Description ==
Adults measure 16.3–18.5 mm (0.6–0.7 in) in snout–vent length. The tympanum is distinct and relatively large, ½–¾ of the eye diameter. The finger tips are distinctly dilated into truncate discs, whereas the tips of the outer toes are bluntly rounded.

The eggs are large relative to the body size, 2–2.5 mm (0.1–0.1 in) in diameter for a 17.9-mm female, but few in number – the same female had four eggs in one ovary.

== Distribution and habitat ==
Pelophryne lighti is known from the provinces of Bohol, Samar, Leyte, and Mindanao. Its occurs in riverine areas in montane and lowland forests at elevations of 1,000–2,200 m (3,300–7,200 ft) above sea level; it can persist in slightly disturbed habitats. It inhabits arboreal microhabitats. The tadpoles are aquatic.

This species can be locally common. However, it is threatened by the loss of lowland rainforest caused by agriculture and logging. It is also threatened by the pollution of mountain streams and rivers due to agricultural effluents and mine tailings. However, it is present in several protected areas.
