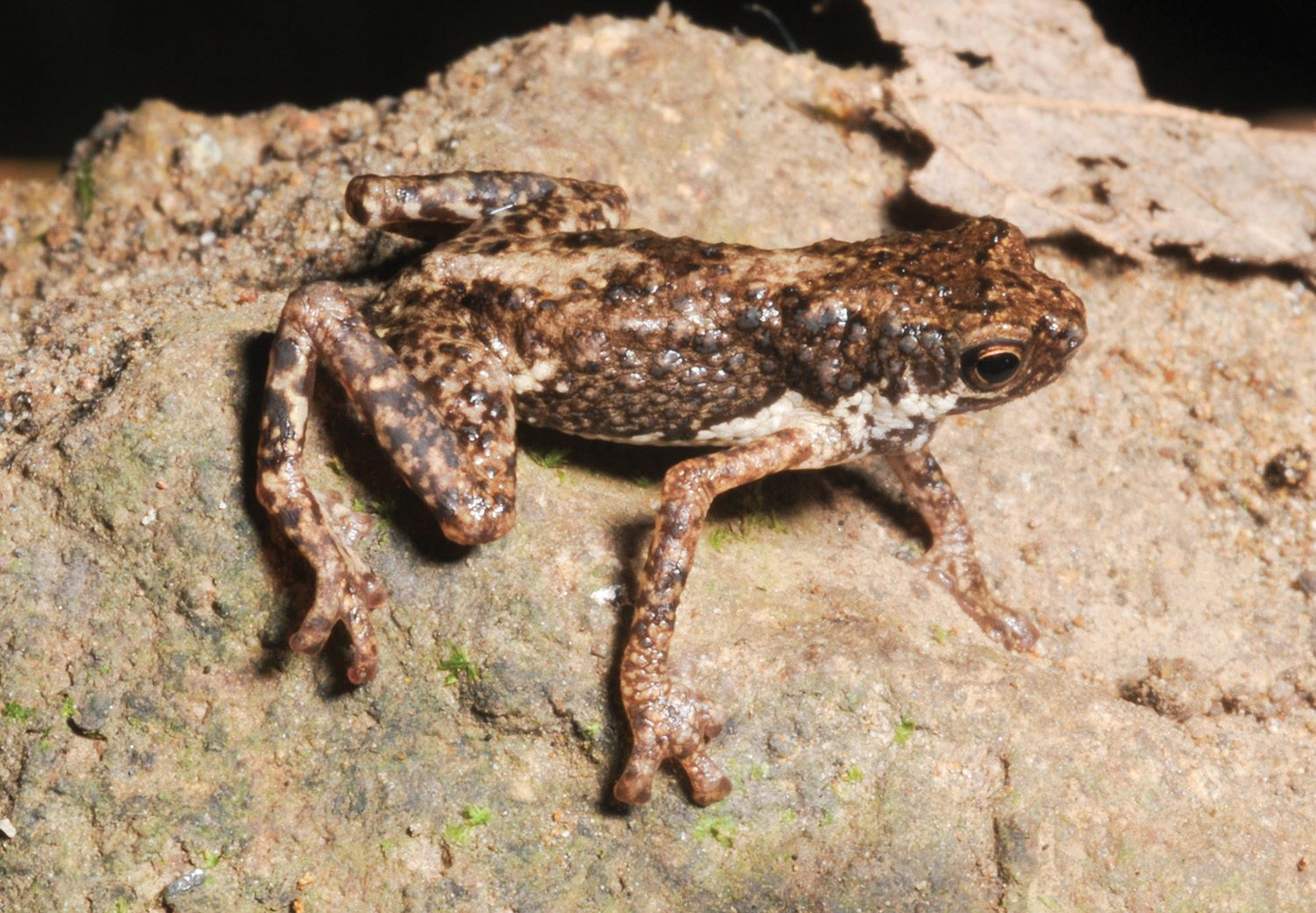
- Male Pelophryne brevipes from Mount Lumot

Conservation status
- Least Concern (IUCN 3.1)

Scientific classification
- Kingdom: Animalia
- Phylum: Chordata
- Class: Amphibia
- Order: Anura
- Family: Bufonidae
- Genus: Pelophryne
- Species: P. brevipes

Binomial name
- Pelophryne brevipes (Peters, 1867)

Synonyms
- Hylaplesia brevipes Peters, 1867; Bufo brevipes (Peters, 1867)

= Pelophryne brevipes =

Species of amphibian

Pelophryne brevipes is a species of toad in the family Bufonidae. It is endemic to the Philippines and found on the islands of Mindanao and Basilan. Records from elsewhere in Southeast Asia (as in IUCN (2004)) refer to Pelophryne signata or possibly other species. Common names Southeast Asian toadlet and Zamboanga flathead toad have been coined for it.

== Description ==
Adult males measure about 16–18 mm (0.6–0.7 in) and adult females about 17 mm (0.7 in) in snout–vent length. The finger discs are expanded but truncate. Males have mandibular spines. The male advertisement call is a soft "beep".

== Habitat and conservation ==
Pelophryne brevipes occurs on the surfaces of shrubs and understory trees near running water. It appears to tolerate some degree of forest disturbance and has been found on ornamental plants around buildings on forest edges. Pelophryne brevipes has been assessed as of "least concern" by the International Union for Conservation of Nature (IUCN), but this assessment assumes that the species has a broad range in Southeast Asia and needs updating.
