= Pelophryne rhopophilia =

Conservation status
- Vulnerable (IUCN 3.1)

Scientific classification
- Kingdom: Animalia
- Phylum: Chordata
- Class: Amphibia
- Order: Anura
- Family: Bufonidae
- Genus: Pelophryne
- Species: P. rhopophilia

Binomial name
- Pelophryne rhopophilia Inger and Stuebing, 1996

Synonyms
- Pelophryne rhopophilius Inger and Stuebing, 1996

Species of amphibian

Pelophryne rhopophilia, also known as lowland dwarf toad, is a species of toad in the family Bufonidae. It is endemic to Borneo and found in north-eastern and south-western Sarawak (Malaysia) and (likely) in adjacent West Kalimantan (Indonesia).

== Description ==
Males measure 20–25 mm (0.79–0.98 in) in snout–vent length; females are larger. They have a slender body. The dorsal colour is dark brown with an X-shaped lighter area. There line between the darker dorsal parts and the white or cream-coloured belly is quite sharp. The belly has also black spots. The skin has warts bearing a small keratinized spine; the larger warts may be red. The fingers are truncate and have fleshy webbing.

== Habitat and conservation ==
Males have been recorded in submontane and montane mossy forests at an elevation of about 800 m (2,600 ft) above sea level. Males call from low shrubs. The eggs are probably deposited in very small rain pools.

The known populations occur in well-protected areas, Gunung Mulu National Park and Lanjak Entimau Wildlife Sanctuary, where the species is not threatened. However, it is likely to occur more widely and be threatened by habitat loss caused by agriculture and logging.
