= Long Lellang =

- Location within Borneo
- Coordinates: 3.45882°N 115.18149°E
- Country: Malaysia
- State: Sarawak
- Elevation: 671 m (2,201 ft)

Long Lellang (also known as Long Lelang) is a small village in the Kelabit highlands of Sarawak, Malaysia. It lies approximately 578 kilometres (359 mi) east-north-east of the state capital Kuching.

The village is predominantly populated by the Kelabit tribe, though a number of Penan people also live there. All the surrounding villages near Long Lellang are Penan villages. The village has shops and a church, and over 100 students are enrolled at the village school, SRK Long Lellang.

The population of Long Lellang is about 100 families.

Long Lellang Airport is a short takeoff and landing (STOL) airfield, providing access to this remote village. An aerial view of the village as it was before the new airstrip and terminal building were constructed is viewable on the Aviation Forum.

Neighbouring settlements include:

- Long Datih 1.9 kilometres (1.2 mi) southwest
- Aro Kangan 3.9 kilometres (2.4 mi) northeast
- Long Labid 11.7 kilometres (7.3 mi) northeast
- Long Merigong 14.6 kilometres (9.1 mi) west
- Long Sait 17.2 kilometres (10.7 mi) south – (about one day's trek)
- Long Krong 20 kilometres (12.4 mi) south
- Long Aar 25 kilometres (15.5 mi) north
- Pa Tik 31.6 kilometres (19.6 mi) northeast

It takes between four and six days to travel on foot from Long Lellang to Bario, the main settlement in the Kelabit highlands.
