= Gapforce =

UK business

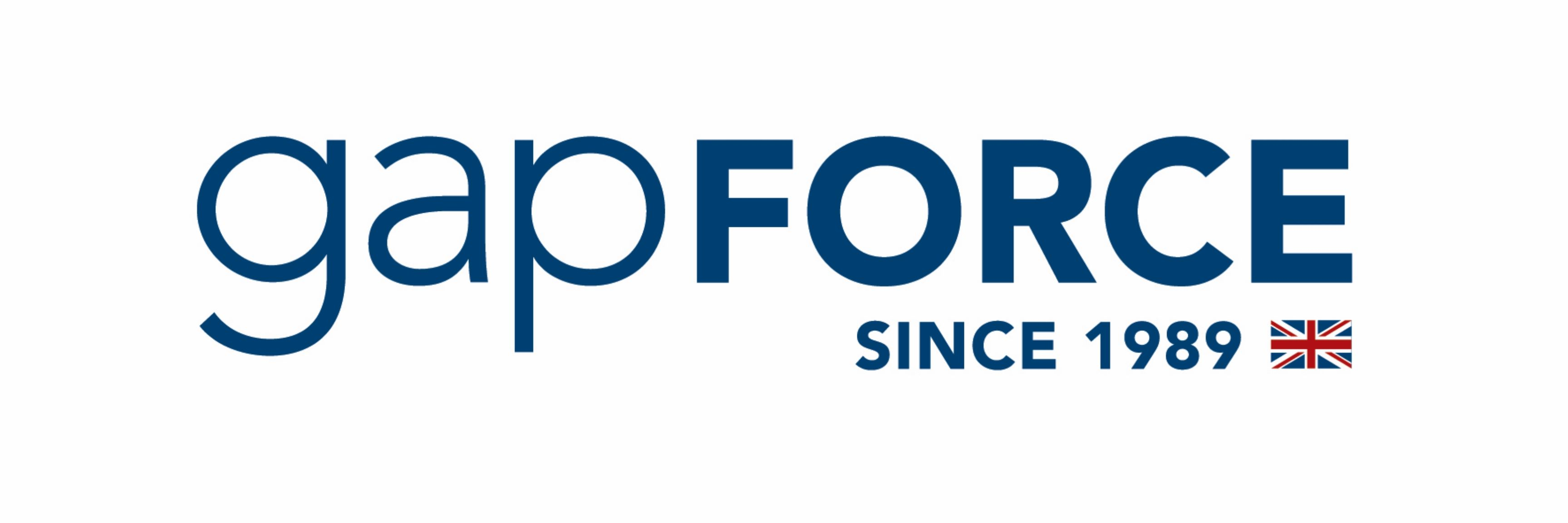
- Gapforce logo
- Company type: Limited company
- Industry: Gap Year
- Founded: 1989
- Headquarters: London, United Kingdom
- Website: www.gapforce.org

Gapforce is a UK-based gap year and student volunteering provider. Founded in 1989, Gapforce is a provider of structured adventure travel programs, volunteer projects, conservation placements and outdoor training courses.

Gapforce is based in the United Kingdom and has in-country staff all around the world.

== Overview ==
Gapforce offers a large variety of volunteer, adventure travel and gap year programs both in the UK and overseas that combine conservation and wildlife volunteering, adventure travel, and outdoor training courses.

== Staff training ==
All Gapforce leaders have completed the Expedition Leader Training course. The 16-week ELT course begins in the mountains of Wales before heading into the jungles of Costa Rica and Panama where participants receive full training and certifications, hands-on skills and comprehensive training, enabling them to safely plan and lead expeditions around the world.
