= Sarawak Gazette =

The Sarawak Gazette
- Type: Newspaper
- Owner: Government of Sarawak
- Founder: Charles Brooke
- Founded: 16 August 1870; 156 years ago
- Ceased publication: 2001
- Political alignment: Non-political
- Headquarters: Court House Road, Kuching
- Website: https://www.pustaka-sarawak.com/gazette/home.php (selected archived issues)

Sarawak Gazette is the oldest newspaper published in Sarawak starting from 1870. The newspaper was founded by Rajah Charles Brooke of Sarawak. The newspaper ceased publication in 2001.

== History ==
On 5 August 1859, Sarawak government authority published a news bulletin, printed by Sarawak Mission Press which mentioned on false reports in Sarawak and suggested that "no reliance be placed on news that is not published by Authority." Eleven years later, the Brooke government bought a secondhand Albion press from England and started publishing "informal editions" of Sarawak Gazette. However, only the 27 June 1870 copy survived.

The Sarawak Gazette started regular publications on 16 August 1870. Reverend John Kemp, a government chaplain became its first editor. John Kemp was given considerable freedom in designing and editing the paper. His first editorial was about the purposes of the Sarawak Gazette. The first objective was to provide news from Sarawak to outstation Europeans and from Europe to Sarawak government officials. The second objective was to carry news from various residencies in Sarawak, on the relations with natives and trading interests. Initially, there was little material from Sarawak, probably because the Rajah supplied little information to the editor; and the first few issues of Sarawak Gazette were dedicated to Franco-Prussian War with materials received from Reuters telegrams or newspapers abroad mail steamers from Europe. After the publication of the first five issues of Sarawak Gazette, editor Kemp rearranged the material and dedicated one section for information of interest to "residents at the outstations". The rest of the paper was about the intelligence on Sarawak. News from Europe soon disappeared from the subsequent editions of the Sarawak Gazette. The contributions to Gazette was initially reserved exclusively for European residents in Sarawak. John Kemp remained as the editor of the gazette until 1873. In 1918, Frederick George Day stepped down from the editor post.

From 1870 to 1876, the Sarawak Gazette was published two weekly, then every month until 1908. After 1908, "purely official matters" such as appointments, leaves, retirements, dismissals, official reports, and laws were moved into another publication, known as "Sarawak Government Gazette". On the other hand, outstation reports and trade returns remained in Sarawak Gazette. In 1911, Sarawak Museum Journal was established, which took off more materials from Sarawak Gazette. Sarawak Gazette resumed two weekly publishing from 1908 until 1921; when after that it went back to monthly publishing until 1941. A Malay section was added to the September until December issues of 1941 editions of Sarawak Gazette. Sarawak Gazette stopped publications during the Japanese Occupation from 1941 to 1945. After World War II, the Sarawak Gazette was published monthly.

Before 1876, the Sarawak Gazette was three to four pages in length. Then gradually, the Gazette expanded its number of pages to 20 pages and 30 pages later.

The volume number started afresh at the start of each year. Meanwhile, the issue number is counted consecutively from the first issue. As of 1966, the Sarawak Gazette had published 1,300 issues.

The Sarawak Gazette published its last issue in 2001.

In 2014, 422 issues of Sarawak Gazette were scanned and uploaded online by the Sarawak State Library.

== Contents ==
The Sarawak Gazette before 1941 described the ruling policies of the second White Rajah, Charles Brooke and third White Rajah, Charles Vyner Brooke in detail, including the hostility of Charles Brooke towards North Borneo in 1880. The Sarawak Gazette was critical of Christian missionaries in Sarawak especially the "Society for the Propagation of the Gospel in Foreign Parts". Other facade of Sarawak history such as slavery and the Anglo-American venture at Goebilt village in Kuching Sarawak (that is, to process jelutong plants into chicle, the main ingredient for chewing gums) were also described in the Sarawak Gazette. Minutes of Council Negri (equivalent to Sarawak State Legislative Assembly today), Supreme Council (equivalent to Sarawak cabinet today), Kuching Municipal Council, Committee of Administration meetings, and departmental reports were also included. More specifically, appointments, retirements and dismissals during the Brooke administration were included in the Gazette. Positions and salary information were published as notices and orders. Public works, government departmental services, and community development (medicine, social, fraternal, welfare institutions) were also covered. All the Sarawak laws before 1908 were published in the Sarawak Gazette as notices, orders, and proclamations.

In terms of the economy, coasting trade, foreign trade, shipping, customs, government revenue, and expenditures were covered. Government monopolies such as opium, arrack, gambling and pork farms were sold either by public auctions or sealed bids. Reports on pathological features, cultivation, and production of cash crops such as gambier, rubber, sago, and pepper were also available. Experimental tobacco, coffee, tea, and pineapple cultivations were also included. Other literature included the amount of forest produce collected before 1919, geology and updates on antimony, mercury, gold explorations and oil production. Anthropological studies on Iban and other indigenous ethnic groups, and the migration of Chinese and Europeans in Sarawak were also well reported.

Journals of Hugh Brooke Low (son of Hugh Low) appeared in 1882 to 1884 issues of Sarawak Gazette. Rajah also ordered the reprint of the entire book of Charles Grant in 1885 in the Sarawak Gazette.

During the Indonesia–Malaysia confrontation, Sarawak Gazette published non-controversial issues such as the change of circumstances of Malayan, British and local units involved and happenings at the border villages.

== Funding ==
The Sarawak Gazette was initially funded by the Brooke government until 1941, followed by the colonial government until 1963, by the Malaysian federal government until 1964. Since 1965, the government of Sarawak started to fund the Sarawak Gazette.

== Censorship ==
The second Rajah of Sarawak did not censor the Sarawak Gazette but preferred to publish corrections in later issues. The third Rajah of Sarawak appointed the chief secretary to censor the Gazette. During the Crown Colony of Sarawak, censorship became a regular feature. There was also a restriction on the publication of adverse criticism of Brooke policy.

== See also ==
- Sarawak Gazette issues on Wikisource
