= Kelabit Highlands =

Mountain range in Malaysia

Coordinates: 3°42′N 115°30′E

The Kelabit Highlands are a mountain range located in the northernmost part of Sarawak, Malaysia in the Miri Division. It hosts the Bario village. The highest mountains in this range are Mount Murud at 2,423 metres (7,949 ft), Bukit Batu Buli at 2,082 metres (6,831 ft), and Bukit Batu Lawi at 2,046 metres (6,713 ft). The current population of the Kelabit people is about 6,800.

Maligan Highlands, another highland nearby located within the Limbang Division, hosts the Ba'kelalan village.

== Geography ==
The rocks of the Kelabit Highlands comprise mudstones, sandstones, and limestones ranging in age from the Oligocene to Miocene periods. In terms of plate tectonics, the region was a basin formed by warping at a subduction zone where the continental crust was forced upwards. The estimated rate of uplift is 20 mm per century for the last two million years. Bario showed a lowering in temperatures during the Last Glacial Maximum (LGM).

== Villages ==
=== Bario ===
The area hosts 13 villages. Seven of these are in the Bario area while the others are around the outskirts of the plateau. 'Bario Asal' as the original longhouse within the plateau and Ulung Palang, Arur Dalan, Pa'Ramapoh Atas and Pa'Ramapoh Bawah, Pa' Derung, Padang Pasir and Kampung Baru are resettled villages in 1960s. To the east side are Pa'Umor, Pa'Ukat and Pa'Lungan and to the south are Long Dano, Pa'Dallih and Remudu. The other two villages are Long Lellang and Long Seridan.

== Economy ==
In 2011, Ceria Group, a Malaysian agricultural company introduced mechanised farming of rice in the region.
