= Long Tungan =

- Location within Borneo
- Coordinates: 3.13333°N 115.16667°E
- Country: Malaysia
- State: Sarawak
- Administrative Division: Marudi
- Elevation: 1,465 m (4,806 ft)

Long Tungan (also known as Kenyah Jamok) is a settlement in the Marudi division of Sarawak, Malaysia. It lies approximately 564.4 kilometres (351 mi) east-north-east of the state capital Kuching.

The people are from the Kenyah Jamok tribe. The village is located in the Upper Baram region between Lio Matoh (upstream) and Long Semiyang (downstream).

Neighbouring settlements include:

- Lio Matoh 8.3 kilometres (5.2 mi) northeast
- Long Selaan 10.8 kilometres (6.7 mi) southwest
- Long Moh 13.4 kilometres (8.3 mi) southwest
- Long Metapa 15.8 kilometres (9.8 mi) east
- Long Salt 19.2 kilometres (11.9 mi) north
- Long Banga 25.2 kilometres (15.7 mi) east
- Long Taan 29.3 kilometres (18.2 mi) southwest
- Long Peluan 30.4 kilometres (18.9 mi) northeast
