= Pa Tik =

- Location within Borneo
- Coordinates: 3.71667°N 115.3°E
- Country: Malaysia
- State: Sarawak
- Elevation: 863 m (2,831 ft)

Pa Tik is a settlement in the mountainous interior of Sarawak, Malaysia. It lies approximately 601 kilometres (373 mi) east-north-east of the state capital Kuching.

Neighbouring settlements include:

- Kubaan 5.6 kilometres (3.5 mi) north
- Long Aar 6.7 kilometres (4.2 mi) southwest
- Long Semirang 11.9 kilometres (7.4 mi) northeast
- Bario 17.1 kilometres (10.6 mi) east
- Long Labid 20 kilometres (12.4 mi) south
- Buyo 21.7 kilometres (13.5 mi) north
- Pa Umor 24.1 kilometres (15.0 mi) east
