= Long Rapung =

- Location within Borneo
- Coordinates: 3.86667°N 115.56667°E
- Country: Malaysia
- State: Sarawak
- Administrative Division: Marudi
- Elevation: 1,443 m (4,734 ft)

Long Rapung is a former settlement in the Marudi division of Sarawak, Malaysia. It lies approximately 634.8 kilometres (394 mi) east-north-east of the state capital Kuching. Long Rapung lies in the Dapur River floodplain. It was formerly a village but was evacuated during the Confrontation. Now the shelters provide overnight accommodation hunters and for visitors walking to Ba Kelalan or climbing Gunung Murud.

Neighbouring settlements include:

- Pa Lungan 8.3 kilometres (5.2 mi) southwest
- Punang Kelalan 10.8 kilometres (6.7 mi) northeast
- Ba Kelalan 14.1 kilometres (8.8 mi) northeast
- Long Komap 14.1 kilometres (8.8 mi) northeast
- Long Langai 14.1 kilometres (8.8 mi) northeast
- Long Muda 14.1 kilometres (8.8 mi) northeast
- Long Lamutut 14.1 kilometres (8.8 mi) northeast
- Long Ritan 15.8 kilometres (9.8 mi) north
- Pa Rusa 15.8 kilometres (9.8 mi) north
- Pa Umor 15.8 kilometres (9.8 mi) south
