= Batu Buli Hill =

Mountain in Malaysia

Coordinates: 3°49′49.7″N 115°25′50.6″E

Highest point
- Elevation: 2,082 m (6,831 ft)

Geography
- Location: Sarawak, Borneo
- Parent range: Kelabit Highlands

Batu Buli Hill is a mountain located in the Malaysian part of Borneo. At 2,082 metres, it is one of the highest mountains in the state of Sarawak.
