= Ramudu Hulu =

- Location within Borneo
- Coordinates: 3.55°N 115.48333°E
- Country: Malaysia
- State: Sarawak
- Elevation: 1,362 m (4,469 ft)

Ramudu Hulu (also known as Ramudu Ulu, Ramudu or Pa Ramudu) is a settlement in Sarawak, Malaysia. It lies approximately 613 kilometres (381 mi) east-north-east of the state capital Kuching.

Neighbouring settlements include:

- Long Danau 2.6 kilometres (1.6 mi) northeast
- Pa Dali 7.4 kilometres (4.6 mi) east
- Batu Paton 7.6 kilometres (4.7 mi) east
- Pa Mada 7.9 kilometres (4.9 mi) northeast
- Pa Bangar 9.3 kilometres (5.8 mi) northeast
- Pa Main 10 kilometres (6.2 mi) north
- Pa Umor 20.7 kilometres (12.9 mi) north
- Bario 22.6 kilometres (14.0 mi) north
- Lepu Wei 24.7 kilometres (15.3 mi) south
- Long Aar 27.3 kilometres (17.0 mi) northwest
