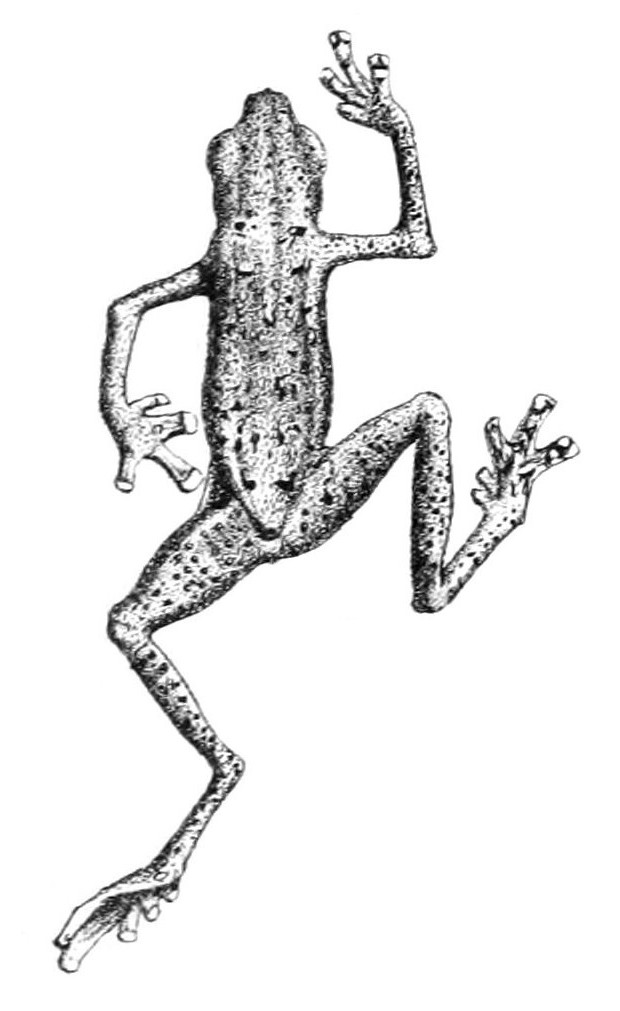

Conservation status
- Least Concern (IUCN 3.1)

Scientific classification
- Kingdom: Animalia
- Phylum: Chordata
- Class: Amphibia
- Order: Anura
- Family: Bufonidae
- Genus: Pelophryne
- Species: P. guentheri

Binomial name
- Pelophryne guentheri (Boulenger, 1882)

Synonyms
- Pelophryne macrotis Boulenger, 1895

= Pelophryne guentheri =

Species of amphibian

Pelophryne guentheri is a species of toad in the family Bufonidae. It is endemic to Borneo and only known from the lowlands of Sarawak, Malaysia, though it is likely to occur also in Sabah (Malaysia) and northeastern Kalimantan (Indonesia). Its natural habitats are tropical moist lowland forests and intermittent freshwater marshes. It is threatened by habitat loss.
