= Pulong Tau National Park =

National park in Sarawak, Malaysia

- Taman Negara Pulong Tau
- IUCN category II (national park)
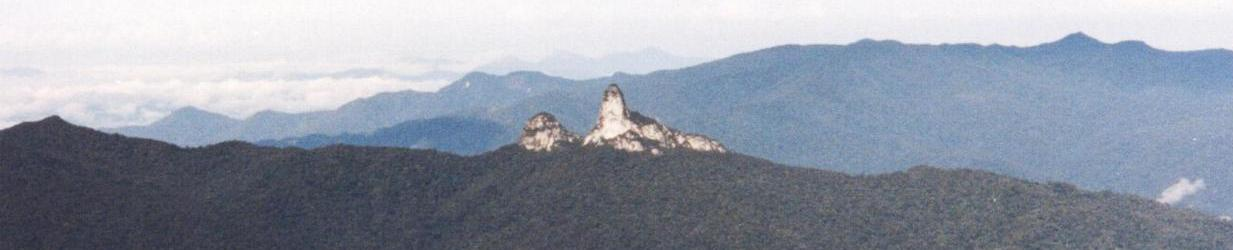
- Batu Lawi, seen from the peak of Gunung Murud, Sarawak, Borneo (1998)

- Location within Malaysia
- Location: Sarawak, Malaysia
- Coordinates: 3°35′35″N 115°19′48″E
- Area: 665.25 km^{2} (256.85 sq mi)
- Established: 1998
- Governing body: Sarawak Forestry Corporation (SFC)

The Pulong Tau National Park (Malay: Taman Negara Pulong Tau) is a national park in Kelabit Highlands in Limbang Division and Miri Division of Sarawak, Malaysia.

== Etymology ==
In Lun Bawang and Kelabit dialects, Pulong Tau means "our forests", which signifies the pride of the indigenous people on their forests heritage.

== History ==
The concept of a national park in this region was started as a community initiative in the 1970s. In 1984, Sarawak's National Parks & Wildlife Office submitted a formal proposal together with a petition letter from the local community to the Sarawak state government. The proposal called for a 164,500-hectare park that included Mount Murud (Sarawak's highest peak), the twin peaks of Bukit Batu Lawi, the Tama Abu mountain range, including the water catchment area of the entire northern Sarawak. Between 1984 and 1987, the Sarawak cabinet approved the proposal but the boundaries need to be redrawn to avoid conflicts with areas designated for land development. In 1986, a population of eastern Sumatran rhinoceros (Dicerorhinus sumatrensis) was discovered. It was previously thought that such rhinoceros population would have extinct in Sarawak. During this survey, the importance of Laurel forest in maintaining bornean bearded pig population was recognised. Rafflesia flowers was also found at the base of Mount Murud. Orang utan was found to enter the park occasionally. Therefore, a second proposal in 1987 argued that these areas should be included within the boundaries of the park. By 1998, when the proclamation to create the park was passed, the proposed area has been reduced to 63,700 hectares and did not include either Batu Lawi, or the area where the rhinoceros was found.

When the national park was gazetted in 2005, the total protected areas was reduced to 59,917 hectares which extends from western side of Kelabit highlands to Tama Abu range of mountains in the south and Mount Murud in the north.

== Geography ==
The Kelabit Highlands is thought to developed from the rifted continental crust where water sediments were deposited before Borneo was separated from the mainland Eurasian Plate. This is evidenced by the presence of evaporite and limestone found in the area. Evidence of folding and faulting along the NE-SW axis is also found in this area. The types of stones changes from oxidised iron and coal-bearing sandstones in the east of Kelabit highlands, to mudstone and limestone of the Kelabit highlands, and grey sandstones westwards in the Mount Murud region. Pulong Tau National Park covers the water catchment area of Baram, Belait, Limbang, Tutong, Trusan, and Padas rivers.

== Biodiversity ==
The national park's vegetation varies with soil type, altitude and topography. It includes upper mixed dipterocarp forest, oak-laurel forest, heath forest (kerangas), mossy elfin forest rich in Rhododendron species. The boundaries of these vegetation types are not distinct but there is certain degree of overlapping between them. There are many species of orchids and Nepenthes pitcher plants. During an expedition in 1998, a total of 67 species of birds from 29 families, of which 13 species (19.4%) are endemic to Borneo was recorded. Examples were Mountain Imperial Pigeons, Chestnut Crested Yuhina, and Blacknest Swifelet. Meanwhile, bird species found at the peaks of Mount Murud and Batu Lawi were Ochraceous Bulbul, and Mountain Blackeye. Besides, 28 species of mammals, 12 of which are endemic to Borneo was also recorded. Examples were: Mountain Giant Rat (Sundamys infraluteus), Summit Rat (Rattus baluensis), and Civet. In addition to that, 18 species of frogs and four species of snakes discovered. Examples were: Wagler's Pit Viper (Trimeresurus wagleri), and Golden legged bush frog (Philautus aurantium). Insects such as Trilobite beetles (Platerodrilus), fruit flies (Drosophila), and weevils can also be found in this region.

== See also ==
- List of national parks of Malaysia
