= Long Aar =

- Location within Borneo
- Coordinates: 3.66667°N 115.26667°E
- Country: Malaysia
- State: Sarawak
- Elevation: 1,342 m (4,403 ft)

Long Aar (also known as Long Ar) is a settlement in the mountainous interior of Sarawak, Malaysia. It lies approximately 595.4 kilometres (370 mi) east-north-east of the state capital Kuching.

Neighbouring settlements include:

- Pa Tik 6.7 kilometres (4.2 mi) northeast
- Kubaan 11.7 kilometres (7.3 mi) north
- Long Labid 13.5 kilometres (8.4 mi) south
- Long Semirang 18.3 kilometres (11.4 mi) northeast
- Aro Kangan 21.4 kilometres (13.3 mi) south
- Bario 22.4 kilometres (13.9 mi) northeast
