= Bareo =

Bareo is a small village situated on the National Highway-31 in Nawada District, Bihar, India. It shares schools with Namdarganj as other nearby villages in this area. The population consists of both Hindus and Muslims. There is a playground in Bareo which is named as Baero High School Ground. There is also one river passing through Bareo famously known as Khuri and the bus stop's name is Bareo Ada which is situated on NH31 road. Bareo is only 4 km far from Nawda district. The nearest market of Bareo is Nemadarganj. People generally used to go there and buy some or many things which are used on a daily basis. There are several temples in Bareo; a few are very famous Kali temple, Devi temple, Shiv temple among them also one old and famous masjid.
