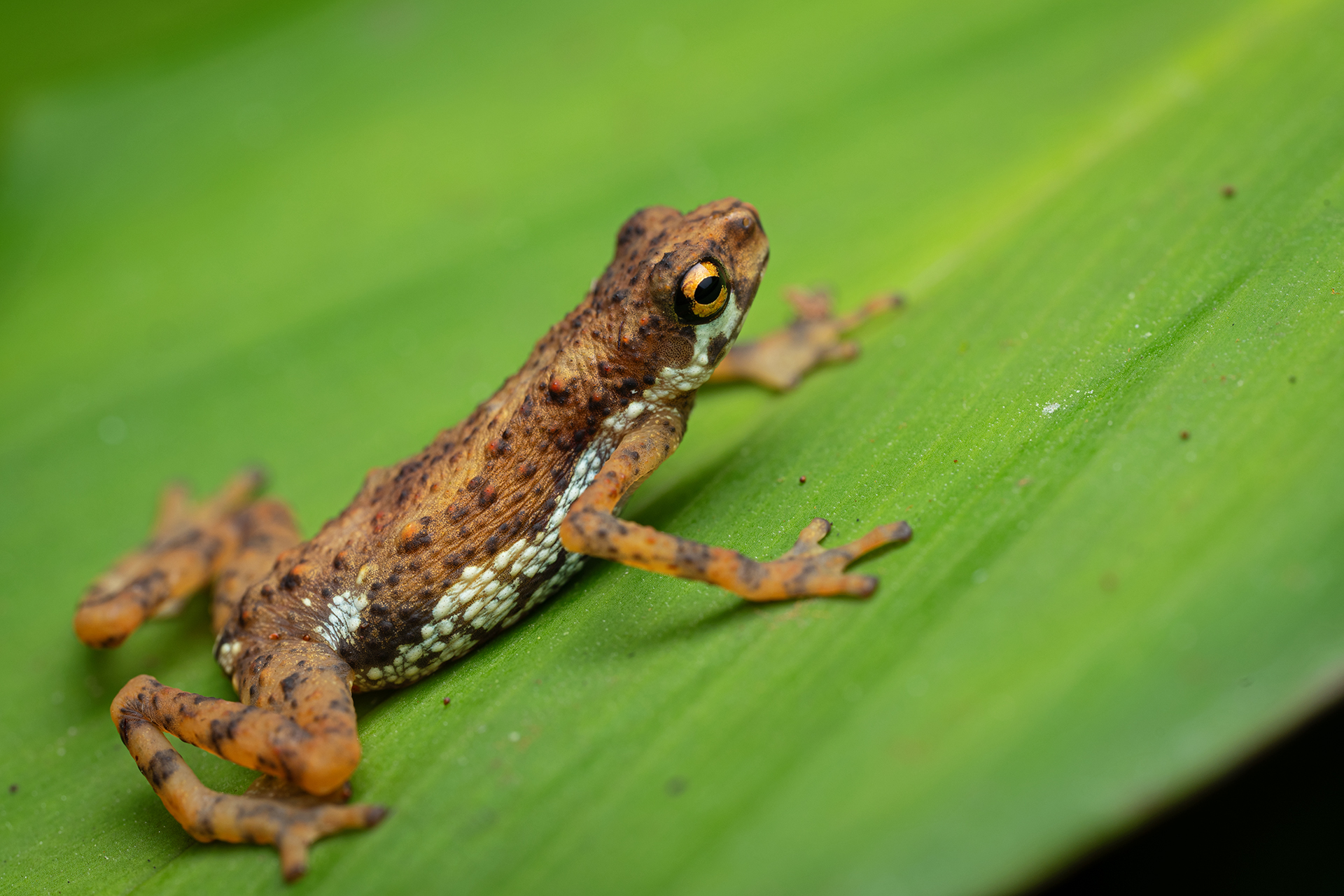

Conservation status
- Least Concern (IUCN 3.1)

Scientific classification
- Kingdom: Animalia
- Phylum: Chordata
- Class: Amphibia
- Order: Anura
- Family: Bufonidae
- Genus: Pelophryne
- Species: P. signata

Binomial name
- Pelophryne signata (Boulenger, 1894)

= Pelophryne signata =

Species of amphibian

Pelophryne signata is a species of toad in the family Bufonidae. It is found in Brunei, Malaysia, and possibly Indonesia. Its natural habitats are subtropical or tropical moist lowland forests and freshwater marshes. It is threatened by habitat loss.
