= Long Lama =

- Town and district capital
- Location within Borneo Location within Malaysia
- Coordinates: 3°45′52″N 114°24′14″E
- Country: Malaysia
- State: Sarawak
- Division: Miri
- District: Marudi
- Elevation: 49 ft (15 m)

Population (2010)
  - Total: 37,082
- Time zone: UTC+8 (Malaysia Standard Time)

Long Lama is a town in Marudi District, Sarawak state in Malaysia. The town is located at 143 km from Miri with a population of 1,500.

== Etymology ==
The name of the town is taken from a nearby river named "Lamah" that joins into the Baram River. The word "Long" is a Kayan word that means "estuary", so "Long Lama" means "estuary of Lamah river".

== History ==
The Chinese first set foot in this town between 1905 and 1910 and built several shophouses for trading. Long Lama was connected to water supply in 1976 and electrical supply in 1986. Cable telephone was only connected in 1990. Ferry services transporting cars across the Baram River started in 2002.

== Geography ==
The town is located at 160 km away from Mulu National Park. Long Lama was submerged in four feet of water during Baram River flood in May 1962.

=== Climate ===
Long Lama has a tropical rainforest climate (Af) with heavy to very heavy rainfall year-round.

Climate data for Long Lama
Month	Jan	Feb	Mar	Apr	May	Jun	Jul	Aug	Sep	Oct	Nov	Dec	Year
Mean daily maximum °C (°F)	30.0 (86.0)	29.9 (85.8)	30.5 (86.9)	31.0 (87.8)	31.3 (88.3)	31.2 (88.2)	31.0 (87.8)	30.9 (87.6)	31.0 (87.8)	30.6 (87.1)	30.6 (87.1)	30.4 (86.7)	30.7 (87.3)
Daily mean °C (°F)	26.6 (79.9)	26.5 (79.7)	26.9 (80.4)	27.3 (81.1)	27.5 (81.5)	27.3 (81.1)	27.1 (80.8)	27.0 (80.6)	27.2 (81.0)	26.9 (80.4)	27.0 (80.6)	26.8 (80.2)	27.0 (80.6)
Mean daily minimum °C (°F)	23.2 (73.8)	23.2 (73.8)	23.4 (74.1)	23.7 (74.7)	23.8 (74.8)	23.5 (74.3)	23.3 (73.9)	23.2 (73.8)	23.4 (74.1)	23.3 (73.9)	23.4 (74.1)	23.3 (73.9)	23.4 (74.1)
Average rainfall mm (inches)	333 (13.1)	240 (9.4)	281 (11.1)	284 (11.2)	323 (12.7)	279 (11.0)	230 (9.1)	283 (11.1)	340 (13.4)	381 (15.0)	369 (14.5)	406 (16.0)	3,749 (147.6)
Source: Climate-Data.org

== Economy ==
In 2017, there were 26 shophouses running various businesses such as groceries, coffeeshops, and hotels.

== Other utilities ==
SMK Long Lama, built in 1965, is the only secondary school near the town. It caters to Form 1 to Form 6 classes.

The first Chinese primary school in Long Lama was built in 1939, named as "Tong Ya" primary school. However, it was forced to shut down during Japanese occupation. Second Chinese primary school was built in 1947, named SJK (C) Kee Tee.

== Transportation ==
In the early days, Long Lama can only be connected to the outside world by Baram River. The boats from Long Lama need to make a stop at Marudi and Miri before traveling to Sibu, which would take a total of three days. Currently there is local bus route run between Miri local bus station to Long Lama Waterfront operate by MTC.
