= Pa Umor =

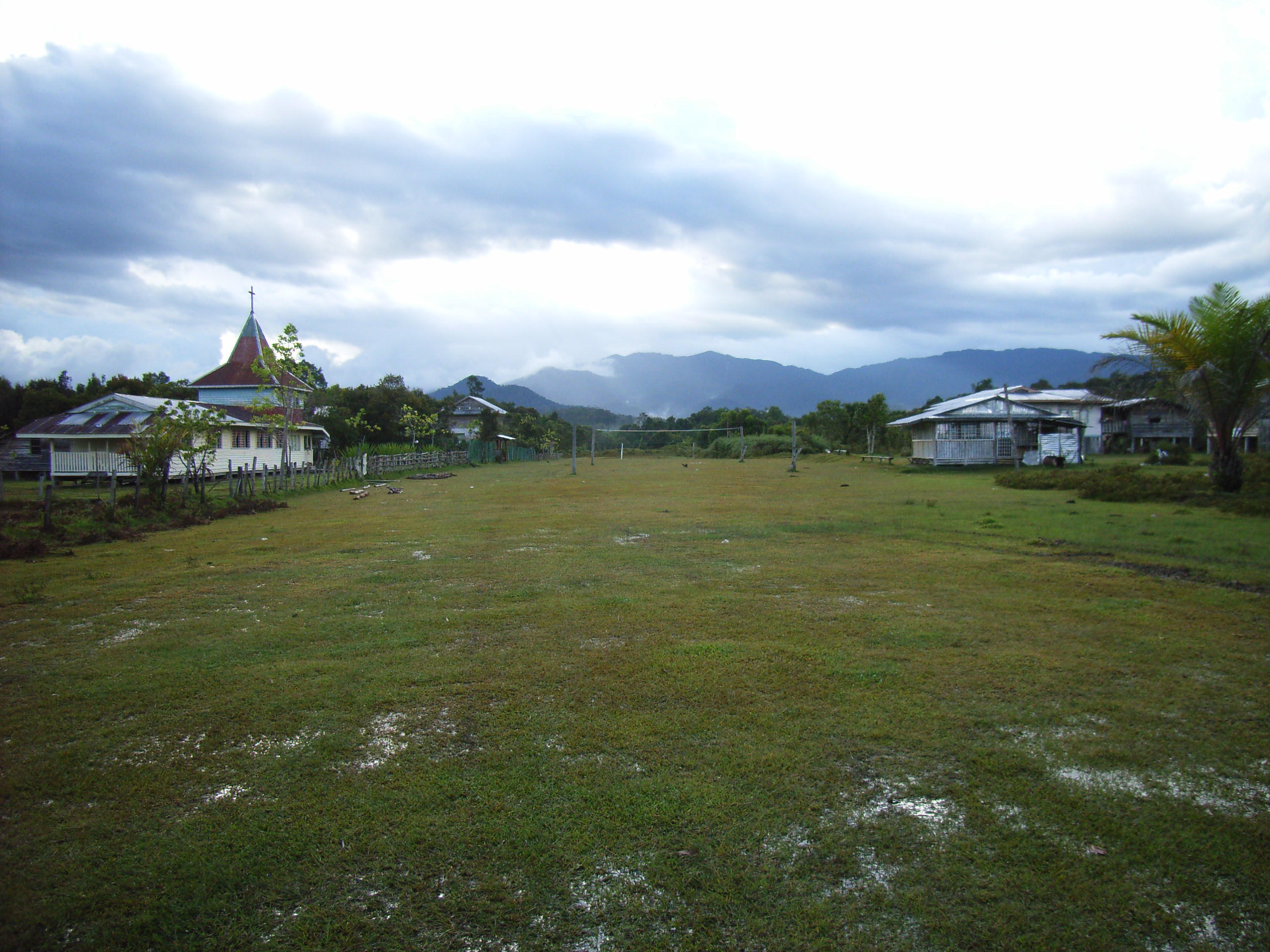
- Pa Umor, May 2006

- Location within Borneo
- Coordinates: 3.73333°N 115.51667°E
- Country: Malaysia
- State: Sarawak
- Administrative Division: Miri Division
- Elevation: 862 m (2,828 ft)

Pa Umor is a settlement in the Marudi division of Sarawak, Malaysia. It lies approximately 623.9 kilometres (388 mi) east-north-east of the state's capital, Kuching.

The village lies about an hour’s walk east of Bario, and is only a few kilometres from the Indonesian border. There is a salt spring close to Pa Umor, significant because, without a local source of salt, inhabitants would have to travel to the coast for it.

In 2007 the village population was made up of about forty Kelabit families.

Neighbouring settlements include:

- Bario 7.6 kilometres (4.7 mi) west
- Pa Lungan 7.6 kilometres (4.7 mi) north
- Pa Main 11.1 kilometres (6.9 mi) south
- Pa Mada 15 kilometres (9.3 mi) south
- Pa Bangar 15.3 kilometres (9.5 mi) south
- Long Semirang 15.8 kilometres (9.8 mi) west
- Long Rapung 15.8 kilometres (9.8 mi) north
- Long Danau 18.6 kilometres (11.6 mi) south
- Pa Dali 20.7 kilometres (12.9 mi) south
- Ramudu Hulu 20.7 kilometres (12.9 mi) south
