= Bario =

- Town

Other transcription(s)
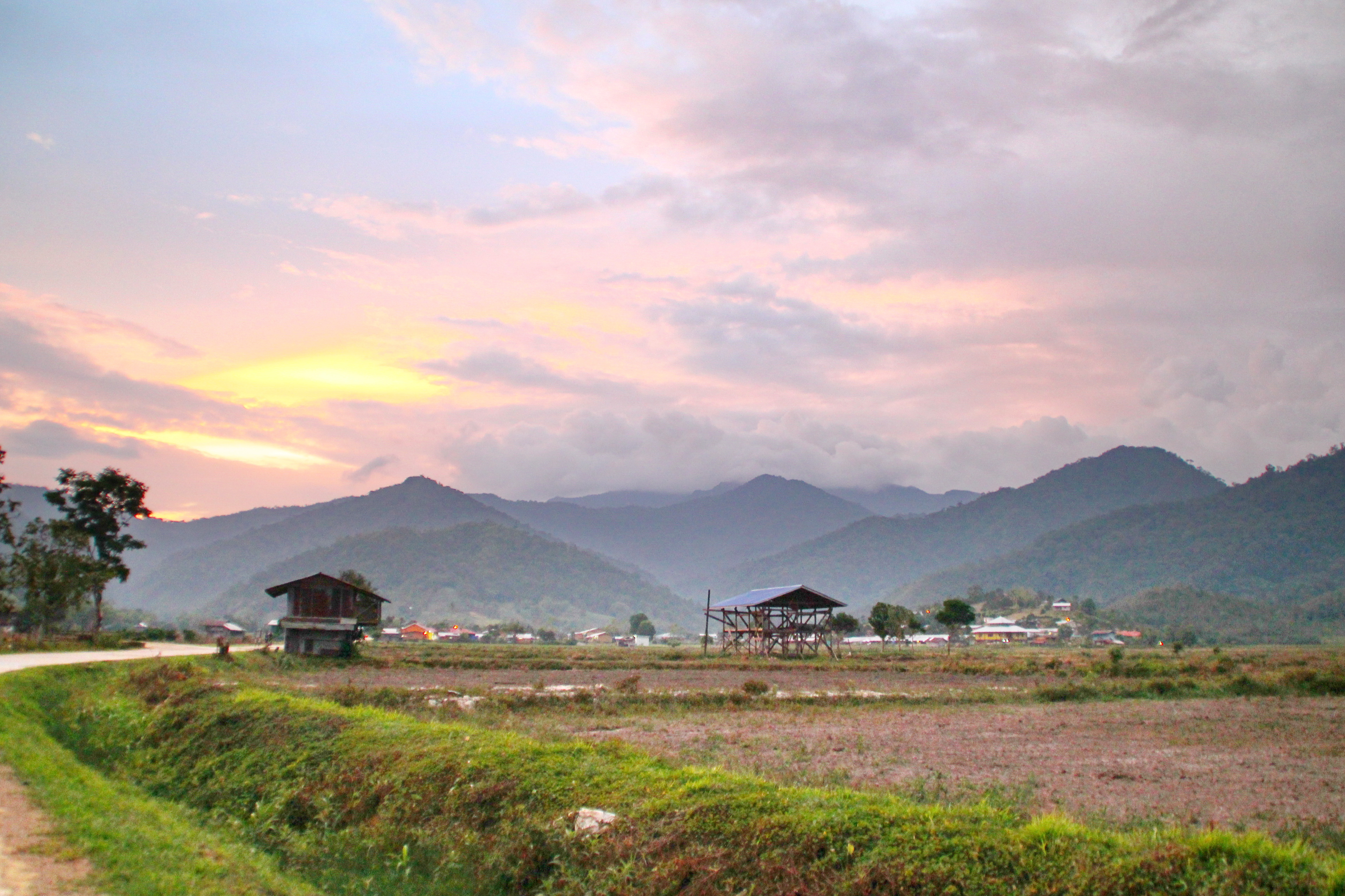
- View of Bario during sunset
- Nickname: Land of a hundred handshakes
- Location in Borneo
- Coordinates: 3°44′6″N 115°28′45″E
- Country: Malaysia
- State: Sarawak
- Division: Miri Division
- District: Miri District
- Sub-district: Bario subdistrict
- Introduction of christianity: 1939
- Operation Semut: 1945
- Mass conversion to christianity: 1973
- Introduction of e-Bario: 1999

Government
  - Penghulu: Ken Paran Matu

Area
  - Total: 3,850 km^{2} (1,490 sq mi)
- Elevation: 1,000 m (3,300 ft)

Population (2003)
  - Total: 1,487
- Time zone: UTC+8 (MST)
  - Summer (DST): UTC+8 (Not observed)
- Postal code: 98xxx
- Website: www.unimas.my/ebario/

Bario is a village of 13 to 16 longhouses located on the Kelabit Highlands in Miri Division, Sarawak, Malaysia, lying at an altitude of 1000 m (3280 ft) above sea level. It is located close to the Sarawak-Kalimantan border, 178 km to the east of Miri. It is the main settlement for the indigenous Kelabit tribe. There are regular flights between the Bario, Miri and Marudi.

== Etymology ==
The name "Bario" comes from Kelabit language and means "wind". It is also known as the "land of a hundred handshakes" as to depict the hospitality of the local people. W. M. Toynbee, a Canadian schoolteacher, also the group headmaster of seven primary schools at Kelabit Highlands from 1963 to 1965, referred to Bario as "Shangri-La" (paradise).

== History ==
According to the oral history of the Kelabit people, all human beings were originated from the mountains. When a big flood cover the earth, some of them built rafts and boats and went to coastal areas. Those stranded on the highlands remain to this today as the Kelabit people.

The Kelabit were headhunters prior to early contacts in the 1920s. In 1939, Frank Davidson of Borneo Evangelical Mission (BEM) visited the Kelabit people in Bario. Since then, the Kelabit changed their belief from animism to Christianity, with the village headman of Pa’Terap settlement, Taman Bulan being one of the first to adopt Christianity.

In the closing months of the Pacific War, Bario became a base for Operation Semut, an anti-Japanese military operation, when a small force under Tom Harrisson landed here by parachute in March 1945. The Kelabit people participated in sabotaging Japanese operations in Sarawak.

The first school in Bario was established in 1946.

The first airstrip in Bario was built by BEM in 1953 for missionary purposes. The Sarawak colonial government acquired the airstrip in 1961. A new concrete airstrip was completed in 1996.

During the Indonesia-Malaysia Confrontation, two of the Kelabit villages located along the Sarawak-Kalimantan border were torched and several others were shot up. The Malaysian government decided to relocate ten Kelabit villages to Bario for safety.

A second wave of mass conversion to Christianity happened in 1973.

In 1999, University Malaysia Sarawak (UNIMAS) created eBario, an ICT project for Bario people to sustain social and economic development in the area when basic amenities such as clean water, electricity and telecommunication were unavailable. As a result of this project, the Bario community was named as one of the Top Seven Intelligent Communities by World Teleport Association in 2001.

Over time, a telecentre (a community centre where discussion of ICT developments takes place), school computer labs, and a community radio station were established.

== Geography ==
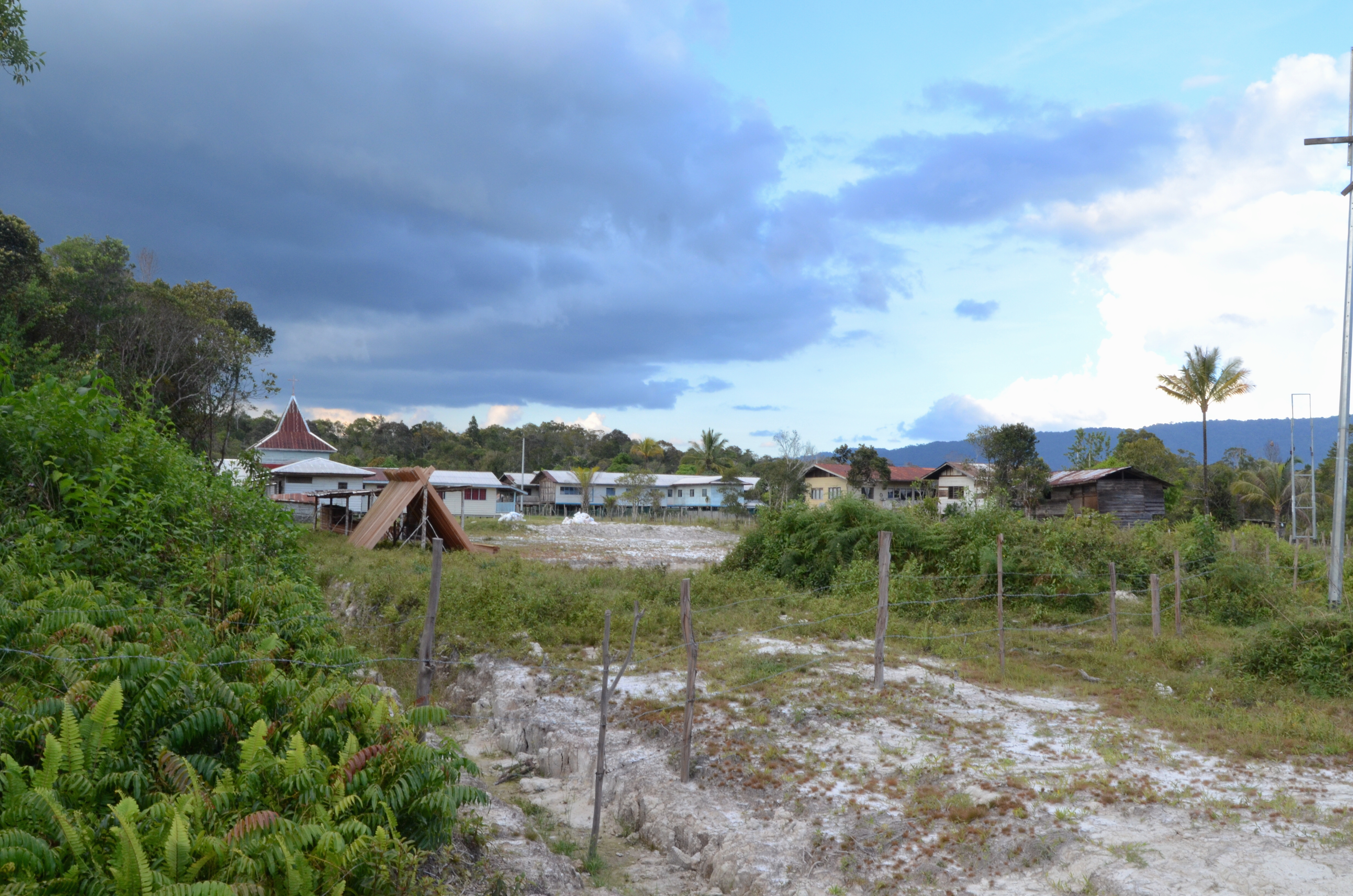
The Pa Umor village in Bario.

The Bario community is located on the Kelabit Highlands, consisting of 13 to 16 villages with a small number of roads linking between them, covering an area of 3,850 km^{2}. It is bordered by the Tamabu range of mountains in the west and Apo Duat mountains in the east. Pulong Tau National Park was gazetted in 2005, covering 164,500 hectares of tropical rainforests. Mount Murud, Bukit Batu Lawi, Bukit Batu Buli, and Bukit Batu Iran are located inside the national park. Mount Murud is the highest peak in Sarawak. Average daily temperatures in Bario range from 14 to 26 °C with average annual rainfall of 2000 mm.

The Bario area also forms the headwaters of Limbang, Kuba-an, Libun, and Dapur rivers; the latter two are the important tributaries for the Tutoh and Ulu Baram rivers. A survey done in 1995 found that the pH of river waters around Bario was acidic, ranging between 4.8 and 5.2. This can be explained by the leaching of acidic organic materials from soil into water. Water stream draining the Bario Asal area was of good quality with a high level of dissolved oxygen and a low amount of suspended solids. However, to the east of Bario Asal, water was of poorer quality due to deforestation and agricultural activities. Pollution from chemicals was insignificant due to low usage of chemical fertilisers.

Near the town of Bario (also known as "Bario Asal"), the prayer mountain is located near the Arur Dalan village while the salt spring is located near Pa Umor village. The exact origin of the salt spring is unknown. However, several hypotheses have been proposed. One stated that fresh water carries salt from clay particles which is found abundantly in shale and mudstones. The soils at Bario are derived from accreting and non-accreting alluvium, consists of poorly drained clays, podzolic sands, and organic soils. Water-logged soils are suitable for rice cultivation, while better drained non-accreting alluvial soils are suitable for vegetables and citrus fruit cultivation. Bario valley has frequent flash floods because of steep mountain ranges and high surface runoffs. The Bario Asal is drained by four small streams of the river with one to four metres in width, which converge into the Dappur river, one of the main tributaries of the upper Baram river. Some research pertaining to Rainfed lowland rice in Sarawak has been reported

== Climate ==
Bario has an elevation moderated tropical rainforest climate (Af) with heavy rainfall year-round.

Climate data for Bario
Month	Jan	Feb	Mar	Apr	May	Jun	Jul	Aug	Sep	Oct	Nov	Dec	Year
Mean daily maximum °C (°F)	25.1 (77.2)	25.0 (77.0)	25.2 (77.4)	25.3 (77.5)	25.2 (77.4)	25.0 (77.0)	24.9 (76.8)	24.9 (76.8)	25.1 (77.2)	25.1 (77.2)	25.2 (77.4)	25.6 (78.1)	25.1 (77.3)
Daily mean °C (°F)	21.5 (70.7)	21.5 (70.7)	21.5 (70.7)	21.7 (71.1)	21.6 (70.9)	21.4 (70.5)	21.3 (70.3)	21.2 (70.2)	21.4 (70.5)	21.5 (70.7)	21.6 (70.9)	22.0 (71.6)	21.5 (70.7)
Mean daily minimum °C (°F)	18.0 (64.4)	18.0 (64.4)	17.9 (64.2)	18.1 (64.6)	18.1 (64.6)	17.9 (64.2)	17.7 (63.9)	17.6 (63.7)	17.7 (63.9)	17.9 (64.2)	18.1 (64.6)	18.4 (65.1)	18.0 (64.3)
Average rainfall mm (inches)	210 (8.3)	219 (8.6)	235 (9.3)	270 (10.6)	331 (13.0)	243 (9.6)	255 (10.0)	233 (9.2)	273 (10.7)	250 (9.8)	267 (10.5)	289 (11.4)	3,075 (121)
Source: Climate-Data.org

== Biodiversity ==
Bario has Dipterocarpaceae forests and 197 species of flowers identified in 1995.

== Governance ==
The Bario community is led by a headman (penghulu) and a committee of community leaders. In 2015, Bario with its surrounding villages are included into a sub-district, covering an area of 4,259 km^{2}, with 46 villages and 7,513 people. The Bario sub-district office is located in the Bario town. In terms of electoral boundaries, the Bario sub-district is included in the Lawas parliamentary constituency. Meanwhile, a large part of the sub-district is located inside the Ba'kelalan state constituency and a small part of it is situated inside the Telang Usan state constituency. Bario was previously governed by Marudi District Office; but since Bario elevation into sub-district in August 2015, Bario is governed under Miri City Council in view of better infrastructure and accessibility from Miri Airport when compared to Marudi.

== Economy ==
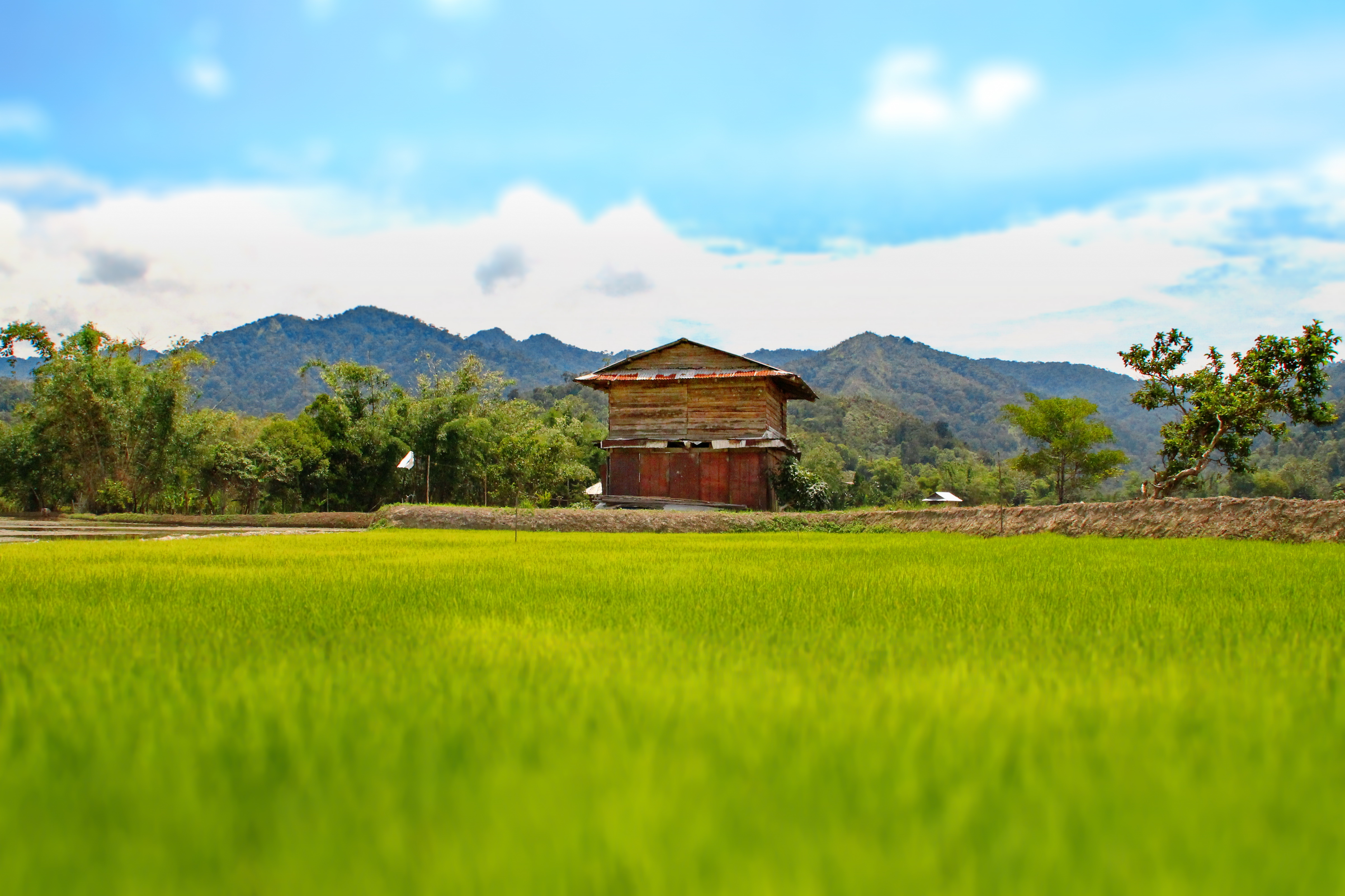
Paddy rice field in Bario

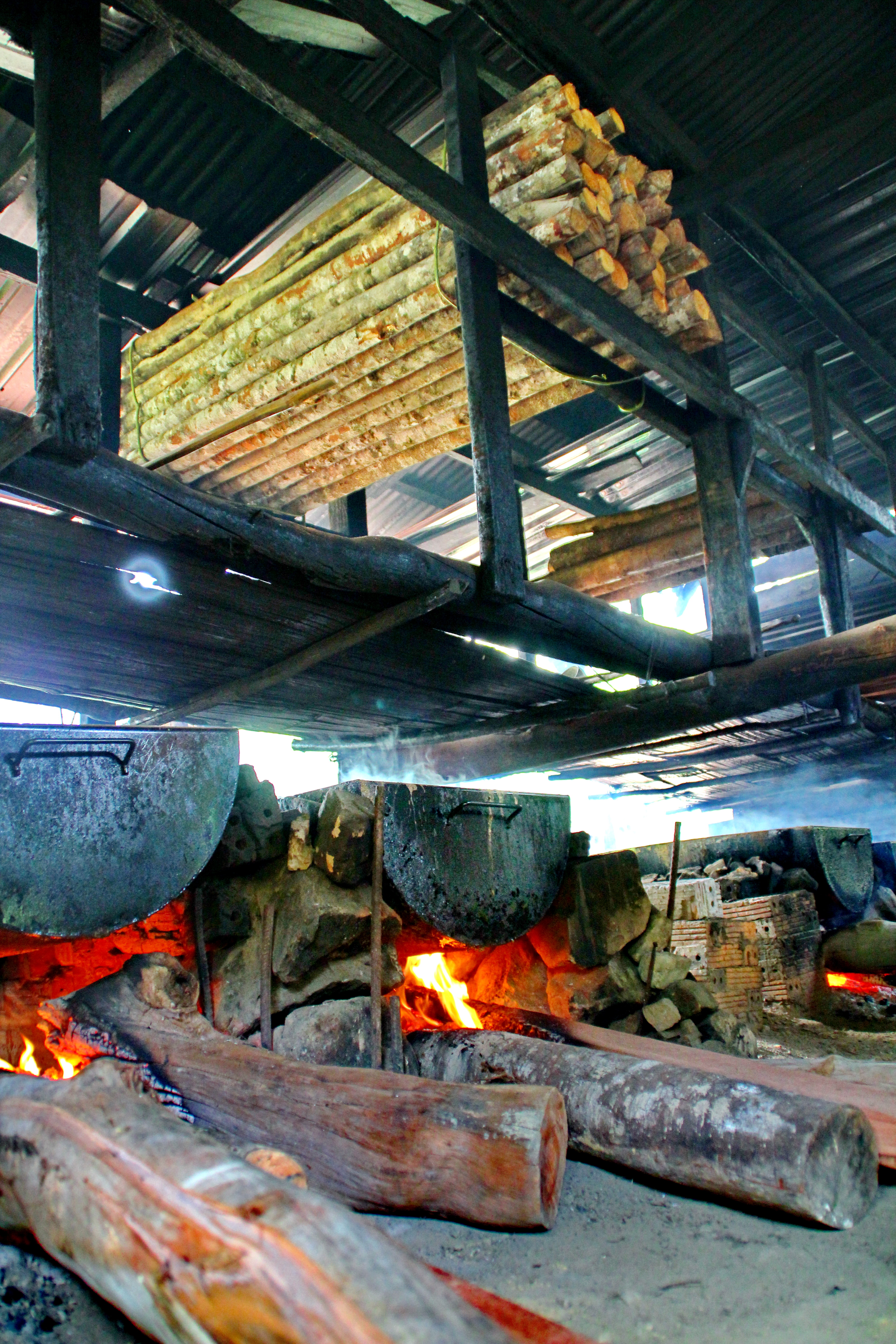
The extraction of Bario salt

The Kelabit people practiced irrigated wet rice and pineapple cultivation using the silvopasture system, and harvesting as well as conserving forest resources. About 500 tons of Bario rice. is produced every year and a portion of it is sold in Sarawak. Among the forest resources collected are firewood, timber, edible ferns, mushroom shoots, wild flowers, orchids, and rattan. Among the animals hunted here are mouse deer, wild boar, monkeys, eel and tilapia fish.

Ecotourism, adventure tourism, cultural tourism, research tourism, and development conferencing are the main tourism activities in Bario. Tourism in Bario had an accidental beginning when the first airstrip was constructed near a headman's house. Visitors would use the headman's home as lodging. The headman did not normally charge a fee for the visitors staying at his house until one day he came up with the idea of converting his home into a guesthouse. In the 1990s, there was only one guesthouse in Bario. After the introduction of eBario in 1999, more villagers started to offer their homes for home stays as more visitors are coming to Bario. Travel operators also hire local people as tour guides. The formation of a guide's association in collaboration with the Sarawak Tourism Board has led to more organised tours around Bario.

Bario has been a destination in adventure expeditions such as Raid Gauloises in 1994, World Challenge Expeditions in 1997, and Trekforce expeditions in 2001. Climbing expeditions are also organised around Bukti Batu Lawi and Mount Murud. The first successful attempts to climb the female peak and male peak of Batu Lawi were made in 1946 and 1986 respectively.

In 2007, e-Bario Sdn Bhd, a company that is responsible for tourism and ICT development, provided logistical and organisation support for UK TV station Ginger Productions for Adrenaline Junkie filming in Bario.

Runners Wild Bario has been held yearly since 2015. It is a non-competitive 50 km run around Bario where the runners can enjoy the scenery.

== Infrastructure ==
The only road connecting Bario to Miri is a rugged logging road which is only navigable using a four-wheel drive vehicle. The journey from Miri to Bario takes 10 to 14 hours, or longer if the road becomes muddy during the rainy season. The lack of proper access roads has caused a high living cost in Bario because goods have to be transported from coastal towns by air. Visitors can visit the villages either by motorbike, mountain bike, longboat or by foot. A 34 kilometre (21 mile) road connecting Bario to Ba'kelalan is being built and is expected to be completed in 2018.

Prior to the introduction of eBario, the place only had one rudimentary two-way radio service station hooked up with the national telephone system. Villagers often had to line up to take turns to connect with operators in Penang for their telephone service. Since the advent of eBario in 1999, computer labs at schools have been established. Power generation in Bario is provided by solar panels, micro-hydroelectric dams, and diesel generators. A Bario solar project was completed by Engineers Without Borders in 2005 which led to a more reliable electricity supply. The computers at schools are powered by diesel generators while the computers at telecentre are solar-powered. The internet connection is provided via a solar-powered very-small-aperture terminal (VSAT).

Bario was the host of the eBario Knowledge Fair from 2007 to 2013, a bi-annual event that explores the usage of ICTs in community development projects and the empowerment of the indigenous people. The project has since been re-branded as eBorneo Knowledge Fair and is hosted by another nearby town, Ba'kelalan.

There are two schools in the Bario town: Bario primary school and Bario secondary school. Bario secondary school only provides education until Form 3 level. Therefore, students must pursue higher education in other cities.

== Demographics ==
According to 2003 statistics from Bario rural clinic, Bario community had 305 households with a population of 1,487 people. Meanwhile, the Bario town (also known as "Bario Asal") consists of 29 households and 192 people. Most of them are elderly or young parents with their children still schooling. There are very few young people here due to limited economic activities in the community. In 2006, 55% of the population were farmers, 21% were pensioners and the remaining 7% were government servants. Most farmers were earning less than RM 500, which was below the poverty line in Sarawak. Due to the shortage of labour, foreign labourers from neighbouring Kalimantan, Indonesia are employed for agricultural production here.

The main language spoken in Bario is the Kelabit language. However, the Malay language is also widely spoken here. A few people speak English well.

== Culture ==
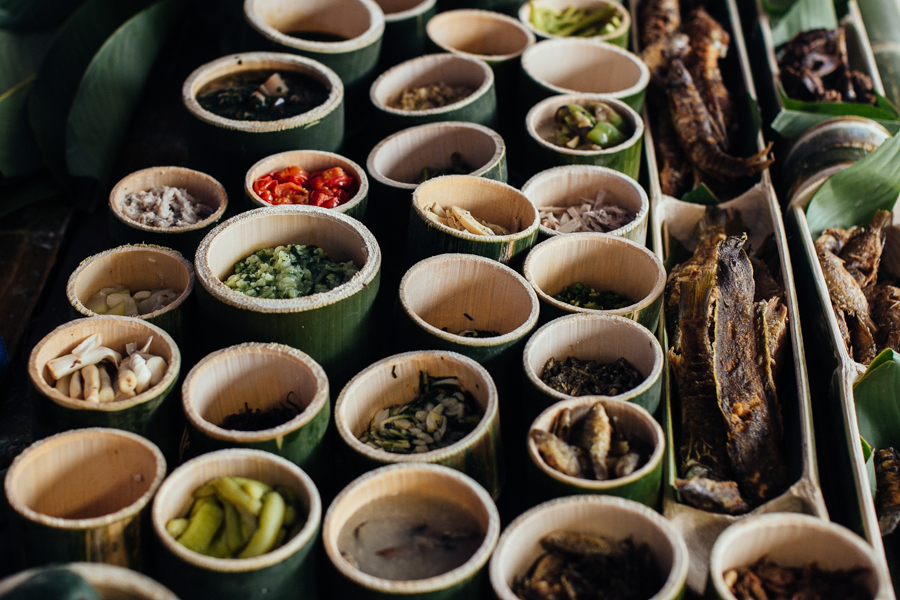
A range of exotic foods at a Bario food festival

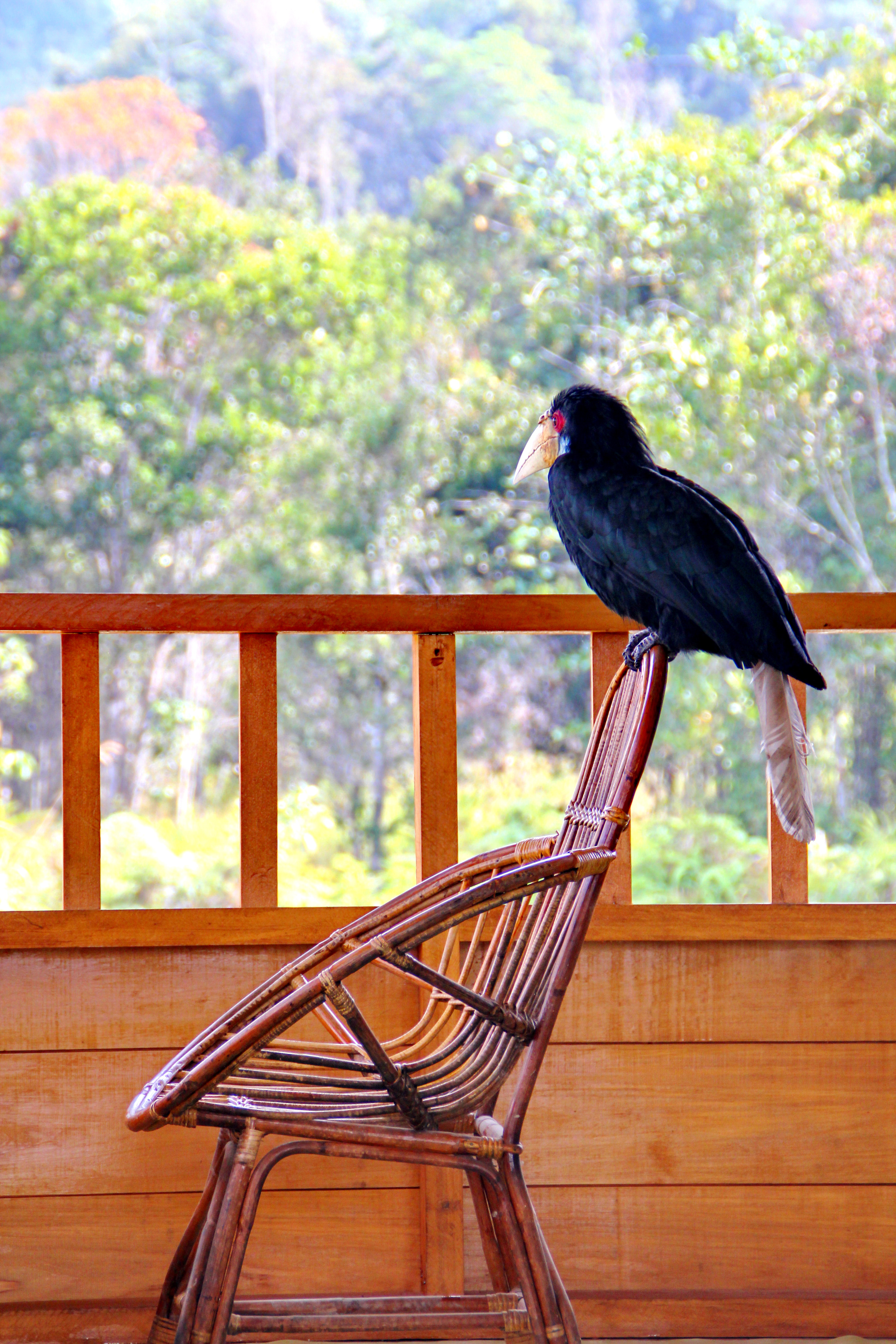
Villagers have affectionately named the wreathed hornbill as "Turo"

Started in 2005, the Bario Slow Food Festival (Pesta Nukenan) is a three-day event held every year which showcases the food and cultural heritage of the Kelabit highlands.

Anthropologists and naturalists come to Bario to conduct research regarding Kelabit culture and biodiversity. For example, a GPS mapping project was done to locate cultural sites, megaliths, and longhouses in Bario.

Rice and pineapple are the two notable agriculture products from Bario. Other notable items include beads and Bario salt.

Over 35 megaliths and stone monuments have been identified in Bario.

The Kelabit people play the dug-out guitar, and pagang, a tube zither. They usually play these instruments in warrior and hornbill dances. Hornbills are regarded as beautiful, gracious and shy birds and the Kelabit people imitate their movements in their dances.

The Kelabits make various handicrafts using bamboo and rattan, such as cooking utensils, baskets, fish traps, and rice winnowing trays. They use grass and bark to make mats, brooms, sun hats, knife sheaths, and rain capes.

Before conversion to Christianity, the Kelabit people frequently sang ritual songs such as "Kuab", "Lakuh", and "Adih". Today, these songs are heard only during special ceremonial functions.
