= Long Tebangan =

- Location within Borneo
- Coordinates: 3.36667°N 114.86667°E
- Country: Malaysia
- State: Sarawak
- Administrative Division: Marudi
- Elevation: 212 m (696 ft)

Long Tebangan is a longhouse settlement in the interior of the Marudi division of Sarawak, Malaysia, on the upper Baram River. It lies approximately 541.7 kilometres (337 mi) east-north-east of the state capital Kuching.

The Malaysian government announced on 27 January 2007 that Long Tebangan was Kampung Gerakan Daya Wawasan (The Vision Village). However, if the Baram Dam hydroelectric project goes ahead, Long Tebangan will be one of the villages affected by the flooding of 389,000 hectares of jungle.

Neighbouring settlements include:

- Long Tap 5.2 kilometres (3.2 mi) southwest
- Long Akah 10.8 kilometres (6.7 mi) southwest
- Long San 11.9 kilometres (7.4 mi) southwest
- Long Seniai 13.1 kilometres (8.1 mi) northeast
- Long Selatong 15.8 kilometres (9.8 mi) south
- Long Merigong 23.2 kilometres (14.4 mi) northeast
- Long Daloh 25.8 kilometres (16.0 mi) northwest
- Long Apu 26.6 kilometres (16.5 mi) south
- Long Julan 30.6 kilometres (19.0 mi) south
- Long Anap 33.8 kilometres (21.0 mi) south
