= Long Selaan =

- Location within Borneo
- Coordinates: 3.08333°N 115.08333°E
- Country: Malaysia
- State: Sarawak
- Elevation: 1,844 m (6,050 ft)

Long Selaan (also written Long Sela'an) is a settlement in Sarawak, Malaysia. It lies approximately 553.9 kilometres (344 mi) east-north-east of the state capital Kuching.

The village is located in the Ulu Baram area on the Baram River between Long Semiyang (upstream) and Long Moh (downstream). Kenyah villages are often located where a small stream joins a large river, and take the name of the stream; in this case the small stream is Sungai Sela'an.

There are three subgroups of the Kenyah people in the village: Lepo'Ke, Lepo'Belukun and Lepo'Tepuan. There has been a longhouse on this site for at least fifty years. When Lepo'Tau people moved to the area from the Silat River, the people of Long Sela'an gave an area of land downriver to them, which became the settlement of Long Moh.

Neighbouring settlements include:

- Long Moh 2.6 kilometres (1.6 mi) southwest
- Long Tungan 10.8 kilometres (6.7 mi) northeast
- Long Taan 18.5 kilometres (11.5 mi) southwest
- Lio Matoh 19.1 kilometres (11.9 mi) northeast
- Long Metapa 26.5 kilometres (16.5 mi) northeast
- Lio Lesong 26.5 kilometres (16.5 mi) southwest
- Long Salt 27.1 kilometres (16.8 mi) northeast
- Long Palai 28 kilometres (17.4 mi) west
- Long Anap 29.7 kilometres (18.5 mi) west
- Long Apu 30.2 kilometres (18.8 mi) west
- Long Pasia in Sabah
- Long Mio in sabah
