= Long Palai =

- Location within Borneo
- Coordinates: 3.05°N 114.83333°E
- Country: Malaysia
- State: Sarawak
- Administrative Division: Marudi
- Elevation: 572 m (1,877 ft)

Long Palai is a settlement in the Marudi division of Sarawak, Malaysia. It lies approximately 526.3 kilometres (327 mi) east-north-east of the state capital Kuching.

Long Palai is located on the Baram River in the Ulu Baram region of the interior of Sarawak, upstream from Long Anap. The people belong to the Kenyah tribe.

Neighbouring settlements include:

- Long Anap 2.6 kilometres (1.6 mi) northwest
- Long Julan 6.7 kilometres (4.2 mi) northwest
- Lio Lesong 8.3 kilometres (5.2 mi) southeast
- Long Apu 9.5 kilometres (5.9 mi) north
- Long Taan 14.9 kilometres (9.3 mi) southeast
- Long Selatong 20.5 kilometres (12.7 mi) north
- Long Moh 26 kilometres (16.2 mi) east
- Long Selaan 28 kilometres (17.4 mi) east
- Long San 28.4 kilometres (17.6 mi) north
- Long Akah 30.2 kilometres (18.8 mi) north
