= Long Julan =

- Location within Borneo
- Coordinates: 3.1°N 114.8°E
- Country: Malaysia
- State: Sarawak
- Administrative Division: Miri
- Elevation: 611 m (2,005 ft)

Long Julan is a Kenyah longhouse in the interior of the Miri division of Sarawak, Malaysia. It lies approximately 524.6 kilometres (326 mi) east-northeast of the state capital Kuching.

The people belong to the Lepo' Abong ethnic group within the Kenyah tribe.

Long Julan is located in the upper reaches of the Baram River at its confluence with Sungai Julan, a tributary which flows down from the Usun Apau National Park.

If the Baram Dam hydroelectric project goes ahead, Long Julan will be one of the villages affected by the flooding of 389,000 hectares of jungle.

Neighbouring settlements include:

- Long Apu 4.1 kilometres (2.5 mi) northeast
- Long Anap 4.1 kilometres (2.5 mi) southeast
- Long Palai 6.7 kilometres (4.2 mi) southeast
- Lio Lesong 14.9 kilometres (9.3 mi) southeast
- Long Selatong 15 kilometres (9.3 mi) north
- Long Taan 21.1 kilometres (13.1 mi) southeast
- Long San 22.3 kilometres (13.9 mi) north
- Long Akah 24.2 kilometres (15.0 mi) north
- Long Tap 26.2 kilometres (16.3 mi) north
- Long Moh 29.9 kilometres (18.6 mi) east
