= Long Tap =

- Location within Borneo
- Coordinates: 3.33333°N 114.83333°E
- Country: Malaysia
- State: Sarawak
- Administrative Division: Miri
- Elevation: 229 m (751 ft)

Long Tap is a Kenyah settlement in the Miri division of Sarawak, Malaysia. It lies approximately 536.9 kilometres (334 mi) east-north-east of the state capital Kuching.

It is located on the Akah River, a tributary of the Baram River, about 10 km upstream from the confluence at Long Akah.

Neighbouring settlements include:

- Long Tebangan 5.2 kilometres (3.2 mi) northeast
- Long Akah 5.9 kilometres (3.7 mi) west
- Long San 6.7 kilometres (4.2 mi) southwest
- Long Selatong 11.3 kilometres (7.0 mi) south
- Long Seniai 18.3 kilometres (11.4 mi) northeast
- Long Apu 22.3 kilometres (13.9 mi) south
- Long Julan 26.2 kilometres (16.3 mi) south
- Long Daloh 27.6 kilometres (17.1 mi) north
- Long Merigong 28.3 kilometres (17.6 mi) northeast
- Long Anap 29.7 kilometres (18.5 mi) south
