= Long Selatong =

- Location within Borneo
- Coordinates: 3.23333°N 114.81667°E
- Country: Malaysia
- State: Sarawak
- Administrative Division: Marudi
- Elevation: 196 m (643 ft)

Long Selatong is a Kenyah longhouse in the Marudi division of Sarawak, Malaysia. It lies approximately 531.2 kilometres (330 mi) east-north-east of the state capital Kuching.

The village was the subject of research into subsistence farming between 1976 and 1980 by Chin See Chung of the Department of Botany, University of Malaya. He spent long periods with the people and learned the Kenyah language. He concluded that "in principle, the Kenyah swidden system and resources utilization patterns and strategies are stable, adaptive and compatible with the functioning of the rainforest ecosystem".

If the Baram Dam hydroelectric project goes ahead, Long Selatong will be one of the villages affected by the flooding of 389,000 hectares of jungle.

Neighbouring settlements include:

- Long San 8.3 kilometres (5.2 mi) northwest
- Long Akah 10 kilometres (6.2 mi) north
- Long Apu 11.1 kilometres (6.9 mi) south
- Long Tap 11.3 kilometres (7.0 mi) north
- Long Julan 15 kilometres (9.3 mi) south
- Long Tebangan 15.8 kilometres (9.8 mi) north
- Long Anap 18.5 kilometres (11.5 mi) south
- Long Palai 20.5 kilometres (12.7 mi) south
- Long Seniai 28.3 kilometres (17.6 mi) northeast
- Lio Lesong 28.4 kilometres (17.6 mi) south
