= Lio Lesong =

- Location within Borneo
- Coordinates: 2.98333°N 114.86667°E
- Country: Malaysia
- State: Sarawak
- Elevation: 443 m (1,453 ft)

Lio Lesong is a settlement in the Upper Baram region of Sarawak, Malaysia. It lies approximately 527.6 kilometres (328 mi) east-north-east of the state capital Kuching.

Neighbouring settlements include:

- Long Palai 8.3 kilometres (5.2 mi) northwest
- Long Taan 9.3 kilometres (5.8 mi) east
- Long Anap 10.8 kilometres (6.7 mi) northwest
- Long Julan 14.9 kilometres (9.3 mi) northwest
- Long Apu 17.6 kilometres (10.9 mi) north
- Long Moh 24.1 kilometres (15.0 mi) northeast
- Long Selaan 26.5 kilometres (16.5 mi) northeast
- Long Selatong 28.4 kilometres (17.6 mi) north
- Long San 36.4 kilometres (22.6 mi) north
- Long Tungan 37.3 kilometres (23.2 mi) northeast
