= Uma Baka' people =

Regions with significant populations
- Borneo: Indonesia (East Kalimantan); Malaysia (Sarawak)

Languages
- Kenyah language (Uma' Baka dialect of the Uma’ Lasan language), Indonesian language, Malaysian language

Religion
- Christianity, Kaharingan

Related ethnic groups
- Badeng people, Lepo' Kulit people

The Uma Baka' tribe were originally from the rural center of Borneo Island. Originally from Bahau River, the Uma Baka' people began moved out from that river system along with the Uma' Kulit people in the 18th century. Although the tribe still remains in East Kalimantan, Indonesia, some of them have moved to Sarawak, Malaysia. The tribe was known as the best hunters in jungle. The Uma Baka' people are considered as a sub-ethnic of the Kenyah people and their language is Uma Baka' language, which is a form of Kenyah language dialect.
