= Long Daloh =

- Location within Borneo
- Coordinates: 3.56667°N 114.75°E
- Country: Malaysia
- State: Sarawak
- Administrative Division: Marudi
- Elevation: 350 m (1,150 ft)

Long Daloh (also known as Long Anyat) is a settlement in the Marudi division of Sarawak, Malaysia. It lies approximately 538.3 kilometres (334 mi) east-north-east of the state capital Kuching.

Neighbouring settlements include:

- Long Seniai 25.7 kilometres (16.0 mi) southeast
- Long Tebangan 25.8 kilometres (16.0 mi) southeast
- Long Bedian 26 kilometres (16.2 mi) north
- Long Tap 27.6 kilometres (17.1 mi) south
- Long Akah 28.1 kilometres (17.5 mi) south
- Long Kasih 29.4 kilometres (18.3 mi) southwest
- Long Atip 29.9 kilometres (18.6 mi) north
- Long San 29.9 kilometres (18.6 mi) south
- Long Wat 34.2 kilometres (21.3 mi) north
- Long Buang 34.8 kilometres (21.6 mi) northwest
