= Long Moh =

- Location within Borneo
- Coordinates: 3.06667°N 115.06667°E
- Country: Malaysia
- State: Sarawak
- Administrative Division: Marudi
- Elevation: 1,873 m (6,145 ft)

Long Moh is a longhouse settlement in the Marudi division of Sarawak, Malaysia. It lies approximately 551.6 kilometres (343 mi) east-north-east of the state capital Kuching.

The village is located in the Ulu Baram area on the Baram River between Long Selaan (upstream) and Long Bela'ong (downstream).

The village belongs to the Kenyah people, an indigenous tribe in the Sarawak interior. The village was originally established when tribespeople of the Lepo'Tau subgroup moved to the area from the Silat River, and the people of Long Selaan gave an area of land to them. It is located at the confluence of a small stream with the larger Baram River, as is often the case with Kenyah villages.

Neighbouring settlements include:

- Long Selaan 2.6 kilometres (1.6 mi) northeast
- Long Tungan 13.4 kilometres (8.3 mi) northeast
- Long Taan 15.9 kilometres (9.9 mi) southwest
- Lio Matoh 21.6 kilometres (13.4 mi) northeast
- Lio Lesong 24.1 kilometres (15.0 mi) southwest
- Long Palai 26 kilometres (16.2 mi) west
- Long Anap 27.8 kilometres (17.3 mi) west
