= ASEAN Bridge =

Batang Baram Bridge Jambatan ASEAN
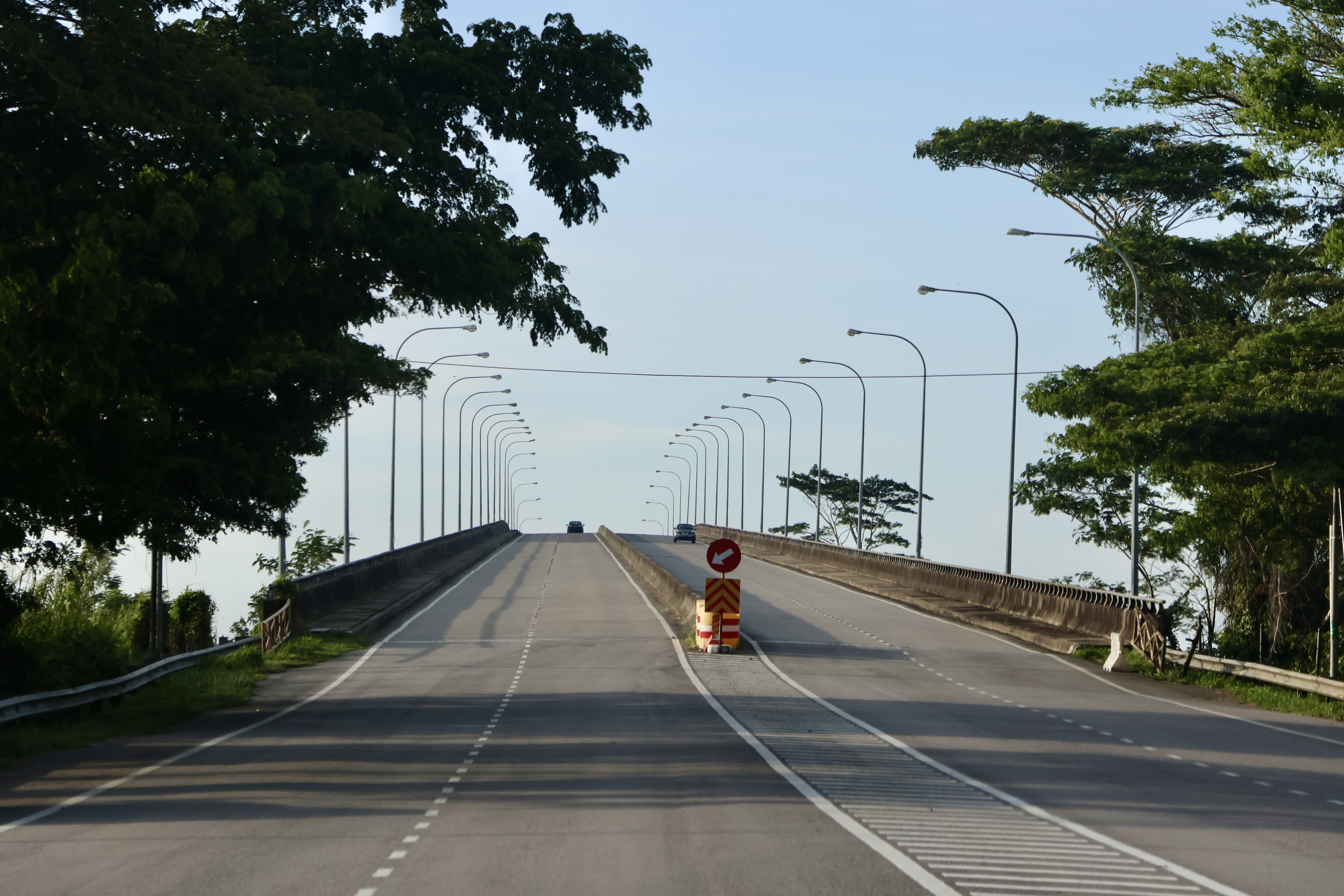
- Coordinates: 4°33′47″N 114°04′26″E
- Carries: Motor vehicles
- Crosses: Baram River
- Locale: FT 1-82 Miri-Baram Highway
- Official name: ASEAN Bridge
- Maintained by: Sarawak Public Works Department (JKR); Cahya Mata Sarawak (CMS)

Characteristics
- Design: box girder bridge
- Total length: 7.769 km
- Width: 1.5 m
- Longest span: 400 m

History
- Designer: State Government of Sarawak; Sarawak Public Works Department (JKR); Cahya Mata Sarawak (CMS)
- Constructed by: Sarawak Public Works Department (JKR); Cahya Mata Sarawak (CMS)
- Opened: 2003

The Batang Baram Bridge or ASEAN Bridge is the longest bridge in Miri Division, Sarawak, Malaysia. The bridge is located along Miri-Baram Highway (Federal Route FT 1-82). The ASEAN Bridge is located approximately 2 km upstream of the New Miri Port Complex. The bridge and access road directly link Sarawak with Brunei across the Batang Baram via the existing Immigration Checkpoint at Sungai Tujuh.

Construction of the ASEAN Bridge and access road commenced on 17 January 2001 and was completed in August 2003. The bridge is designed in accordance with the latest British Standard BS 5400. The bridge has 19 spans with a total of 1040 meters.

== Toll rates ==
Beginning 1 June 2015, the bridge were becoming toll free for local users.

Class	Type of vehicles	Rate (in Malaysian Ringgit (RM))
0	Motorcycles, bicycles or vehicles with 2 or less wheels	
1	Vehicles with 2 axles and 3 or 4 wheels excluding taxis	
2	Vehicles with 2 axles and 5 or 6 wheels excluding buses	
3	Vehicles with 3 or more axles	
4	Taxis	
5	Buses	
