= Data Kakus =

- Location within Borneo
- Coordinates: 2°42′N 113°33′E
- Country: Malaysia
- State: Sarawak
- Administrative Division: Tatau
- Elevation: 210 m (690 ft)

Population (2017)
  - Total: 3,510

Data Kakus (a.k.a. Apau Data) is a remote Kenyah Badeng village settlement in the hilly interior of the Ulu Kakus Tatau division of Sarawak, Malaysia elevates to 650 metres, not far from Tubau and Belaga district. To be exact, Data Kakus is located at the upstream of Sungai Burok and Sungai Nyabet. The highest peak in Ulu Kakus is called Gunung Lumut about 828m located on the peak of Lumut Range not too far from Sungai Bekuyat and Sungai Kakus.

Travel to Data Kakus involves a five hours 4WD drive from Bintulu or Belaga, to get to Data Kakus one has to take the Bintulu-Bakun road and look for the junction to KTS camp from KTS camp to Simpang Jonat. It takes about 60 km using the logging road and from simpang Jonat it takes another 18 km to reach Data Kakus. It is also possible to trek Data Kakus from Belaga and it takes five to seven hours trekking from Long Sungai Pelaran (Sg. Sanan baan Kenyah), Sungai Ngajah from Rajang river then conquer Gunung Ngajah about 444m. The Kakus River, also known as Batang Tatau, originates as a stream in upper Data Kakus named Alo Nyabet, e-iut Nyabet, or Sungai Burok, and flows through Data Kakus valley, where small boats like can easily navigate. It is also easy to travel downriver from Data Kakus to Long Beyak then to Tatau town by longboat; however, the journey takes about a day due to the river's shallow, twisting, and narrow width.

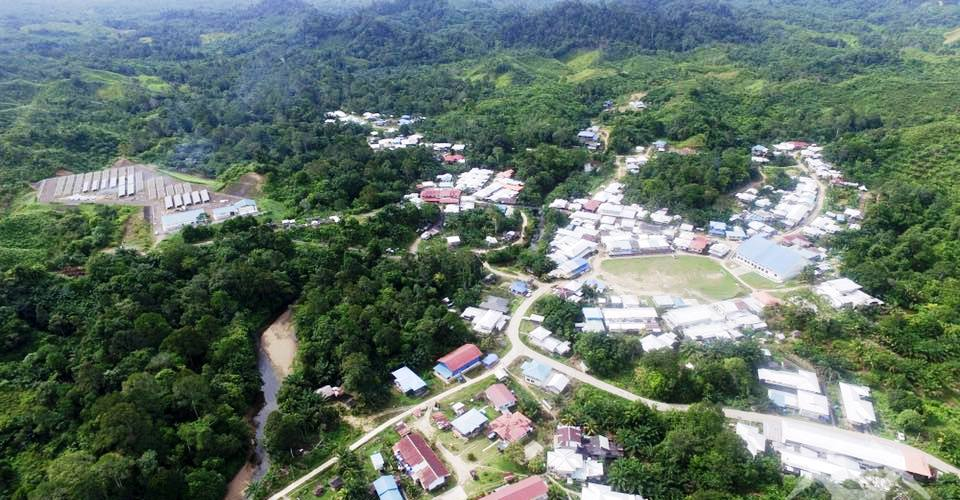
Data Kakus aerial photo

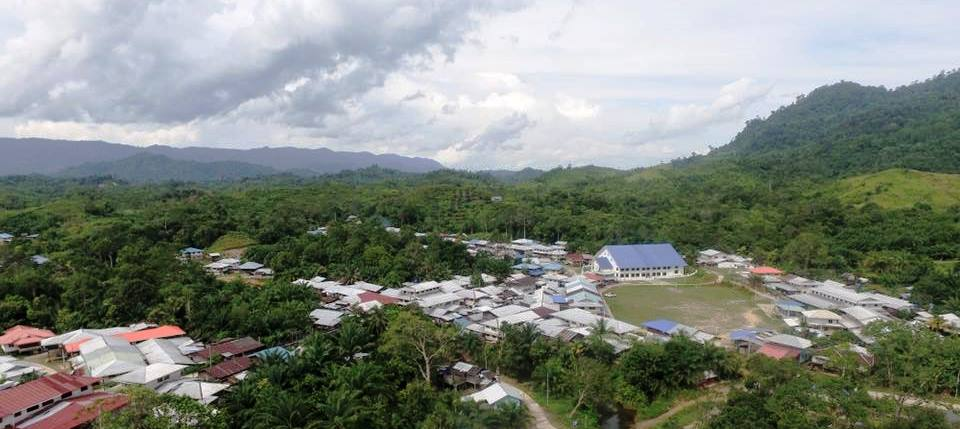
Data Kakus aerial view

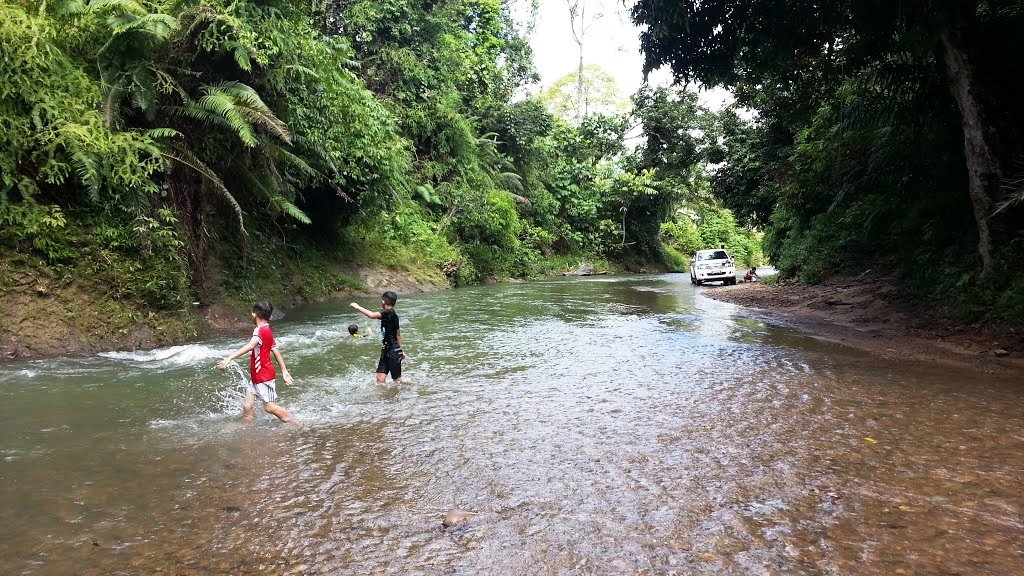
Burok river crystal clear

== Rice production ==
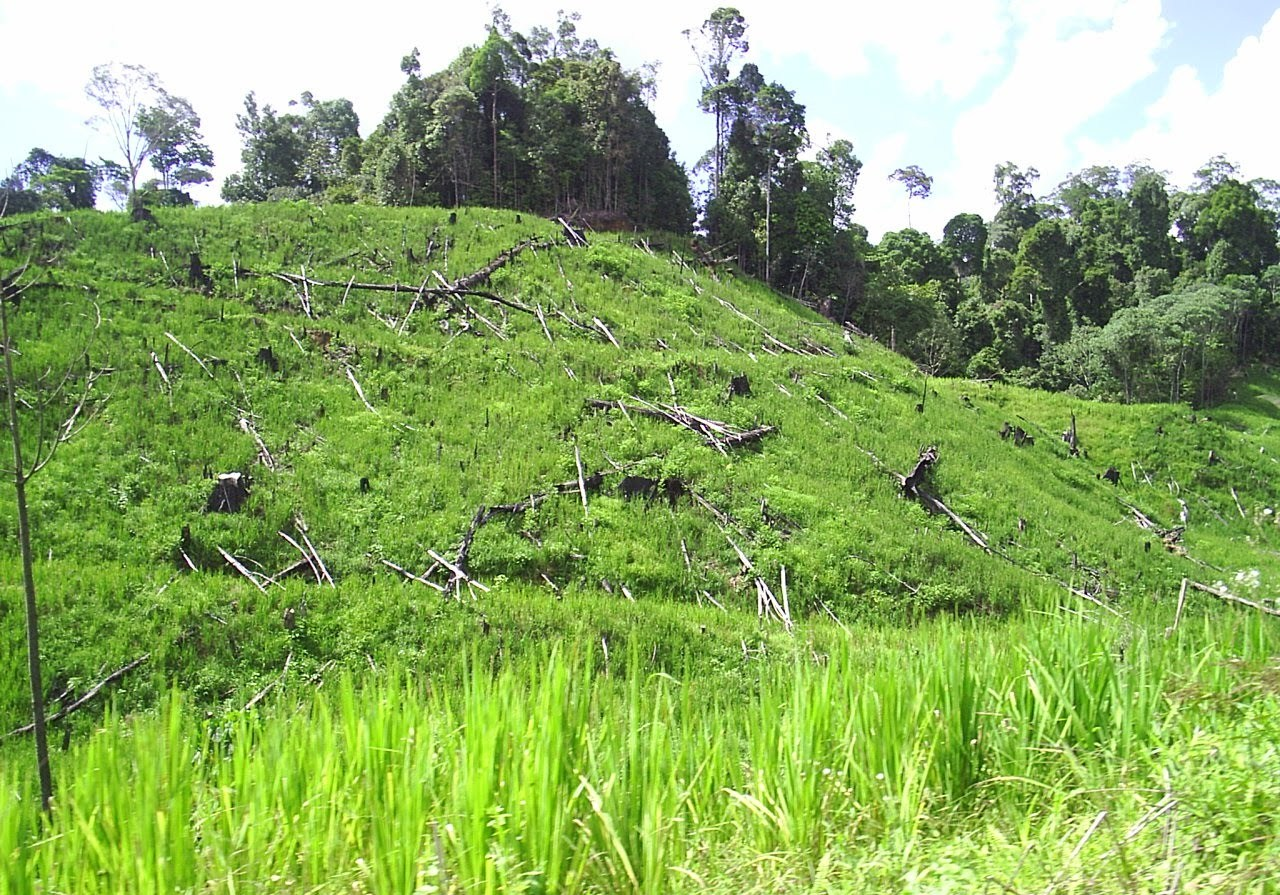
Data Kakus paddy hill rice field - October 2004

This is the primary activity for the majority of Kenyah people in Data Kakus, where most villages produce paddy hills on a few fertile lands such as Sungai Padai, Lalut Deram, Ulu Sungai Burok, Long Ledong, Long Basuruo, Usun Uma', Iut Nyabet, Sungai Kakus, Abak Uma', Diam Songan, and Nyulau.

The traditional paddy planting season begins in early August, and a few months earlier, we cleanse the ground by burning the entire paddy field area. Paddy hills are planted each year in August and September(nugan), and harvesting begins in February of the following year.

== Infrastructure ==
The one and only road linking Data Kakus and Bintulu is an uneven logging road that requires a four-wheel-drive (4WD) vehicle. The drive from Bintulu to Data Kakus will be more difficult if the route becomes slippery, muddy, or flooded during the rainy season. The absence of effective access roads has resulted in high living costs in Data Kakus, as goods must be delivered by land from adjacent towns.

Solar panels and diesel generators provide power for Data Kakus. The Data Kakus solar project was completed by Sarawak Energy in 2017, resulting in a more stable electricity supply. Telephone reception and Internet access are not yet available in Data Kakus; however, it is anticipated that the government will install a telecommunication tower and a solar-powered Very-Small-Aperture Terminal (VSAT) in the future in order to make this possible. To receive a communications signal and make or received phone calls, villagers must travel for roughly an hour to an area called Apau Saga.

Data Kakus has only one elementary school, which is SK Ulu Kakus elementary School. As a result, students must continue their secondary education in either Belaga or Bintulu.

Nearby settlements include:

- Rumah Ado 16.6 kilometres (10.3 mi) northwest
- Sungai Tinggili 15.6 kilometres (9.7 mi) northwest
- Long Beyak 8.6 kilometres (5.3 mi) southwest
- Sungai Kalavang 8.6 kilometres (5.3 mi) southwest
- Long Basurou 4.3 kilometres (2.7 mi) northwest
- Sungai Kakus 6.3 kilometres (3.9 mi) northwest
- Nyulau 5.6 kilometres (3.5 mi) north
- Kampung Kenyah Badeng Senep 50.2 kilometres (31.2 mi) north
