= Long Akah =

- Location within Borneo
- Coordinates: 3.31667°N 114.78333°E
- Country: Malaysia
- State: Sarawak
- Administrative Division: Marudi
- Elevation: 281 m (922 ft)

Long Akah (also known as Long Aka) is an old settlement in the interior of the Telang Usan district of Sarawak, Malaysia, on the upper reaches of the Baram river. It lies approximately 531 kilometres (330 mi) east-north-east of the state capital Kuching.

The village is an old Chinese trading post, about ten minutes downstream by boat from Long San.

It is the site of an old Fort built in 1929 as an administrative centre in Charles Vyner Brooke’s era. The structural timber in the two-storey fort is the very hard Ironwood (local name Kayu Belian) and it has undergone some refurbishment, including replacing the timber roof tiles with zinc roofing.

Neighbouring settlements include:

- Long San 1.9 kilometres (1.2 mi) south
- Long Tap 5.9 kilometres (3.7 mi) east
- Long Selatong 10 kilometres (6.2 mi) south
- Long Tebangan 10.8 kilometres (6.7 mi) northeast
- Long Apu 20.7 kilometres (12.9 mi) south
- Long Seniai 23.7 kilometres (14.7 mi) northeast
- Long Julan 24.2 kilometres (15.0 mi) south
- Long Daloh 28.1 kilometres (17.5 mi) north
- Long Anap 28.1 kilometres (17.5 mi) south
- Long Palai 30.2 kilometres (18.8 mi) south

== Transportation ==
Long Akah Airport is a STOL airfield, providing access to this remote village from Miri and Marudi.
