= Penan language =

Austronesian language spoken in Borneo

Nibong
- Penan
- Native to: Malaysia, Brunei
- Region: Sarawak, Borneo
- Ethnicity: Penan people
- Native speakers: ca. 13,000 (2007–2011)
- Language family: Austronesian: Malayo-Polynesian; North Bornean; North Sarawakan; Kenyah?; Nibong

Language codes
- ISO 639-3: Either: pez – Eastern Penan pne – Western Penan
- Glottolog: east2485 Eastern west2563 Western
- ELP: Eastern Penan

Penan, also known as Punan-Nibong, is a language complex spoken by the Penan people of Borneo. They are related to the Kenyah languages. Glottolog shows Western Penan as closer to Sebop than it is to Eastern Penan.
