= Long Taan =

Google

- Location within Borneo
- Coordinates: 2.98333°N 114.95°E
- Country: Malaysia
- State: Sarawak
- Administrative Division: Marudi
- Elevation: 1,052 m (3,451 ft)

Long Taan is a longhouse settlement in the Marudi division of Sarawak, Malaysia. It lies approximately 536.5 kilometres (333 mi) east-north-east of the state capital Kuching.

Neighbouring settlements include:

- Lio Lesong 9.3 kilometres (5.8 mi) west
- Long Palai 14.9 kilometres (9.3 mi) northwest
- Long Moh 15.9 kilometres (9.9 mi) northeast
- Long Anap 17.5 kilometres (10.9 mi) northwest
- Long Selaan 18.5 kilometres (11.5 mi) northeast
- Long Julan 21.1 kilometres (13.1 mi) northwest
