= Alo Malau =

Alo Malau is Heaven in Asian mythology. In the beliefs of the Kenyah of Borneo, it is where they go after death to be with their ancestors.
