= Sungai Tujoh =

Border checkpoint between Brunei and Malaysia

- Border outpost
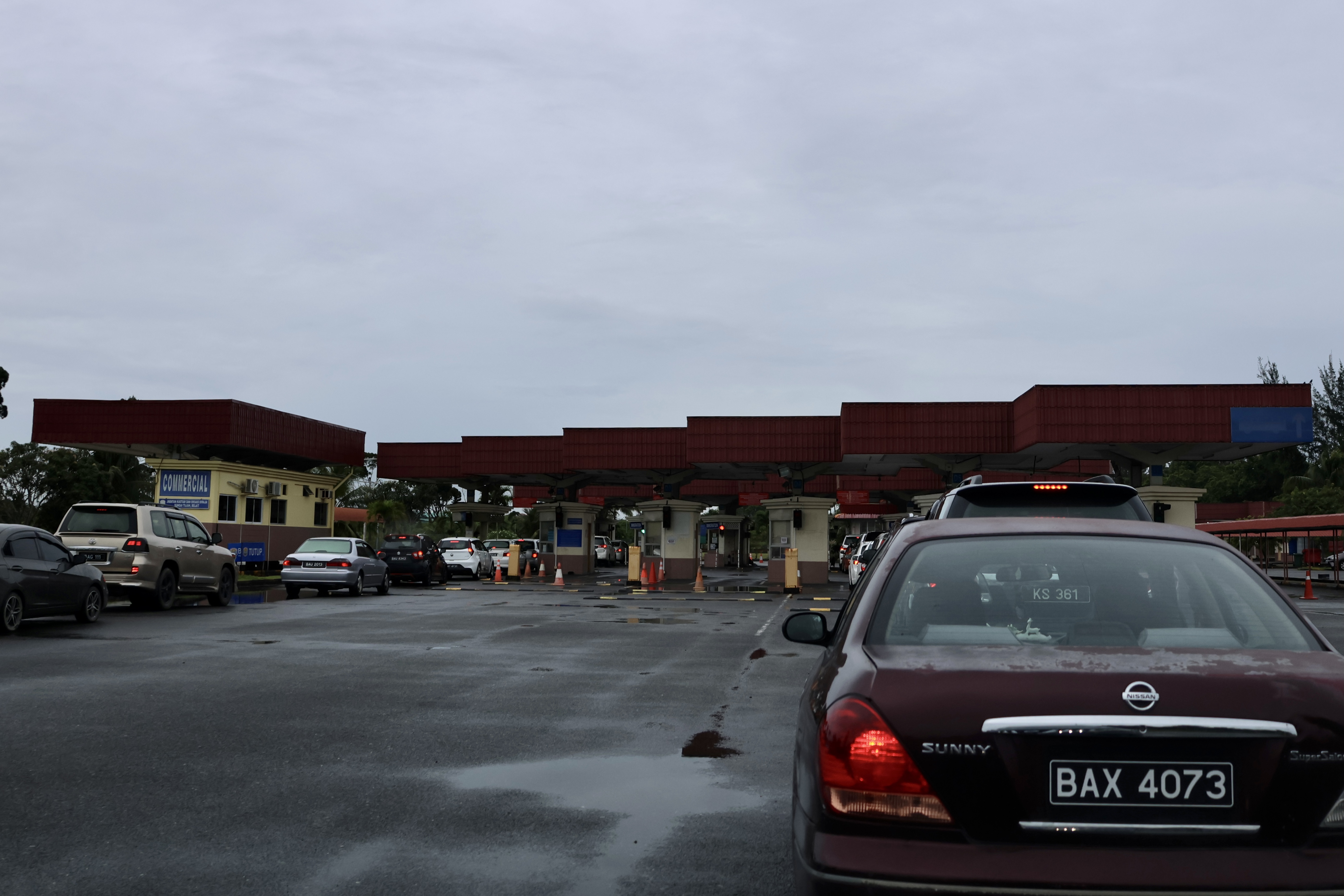
- Sungai Tujoh checkpoint in 2023.

- Location in Brunei
- Coordinates: 4°35′0″N 114°04′0″E
- Country: Brunei
- District: Belait
- Mukim: Kuala Belait

Government
  - Body: Kuala Belait and Seria; Municipal Board

Population
  - Total: 0

Sungai Tujoh (Abbrev: Sg. Tujoh), is the westernmost point of Brunei. It is located in the Belait district.

Sungai Tujoh is a Bruneian territory lies along the Malaysian-Bruneian border. Each country constructed their own immigration complex within their respective territories. The Malaysian side constructed Immigration, Customs, Quarantine and Security (ICQS) Complex at Kuala Baram near the border while Bruneian authorities set up a custom, excise and immigration post staffed by immigration officers. Royal Brunei Police Force (RBPF) control post is also set up to monitor the Brunei-Malaysia border.

== Etymology ==
The name of the area is derived from two Bruneian Malay words - Sungai, which means river or stream, and Tujoh or the number seven. Literally, Sungai Tujoh is translated as the Seventh River or Seventh Stream in English.

Although it is sometimes referred to as Kampong Sungai Tujoh, there is no permanent settlement in the area.

== Location ==
Sungai Tujoh is located at the westernmost point in Brunei, in the Belait district, It borders with Kuala Baram, Miri District, Sarawak. The area is bounded by the border with Malaysia on the west and south side, the South China Sea to the north and the Sungai Enam area to the east.

It is one of the four land crossing points from Brunei to Sarawak and the only one in the Belait district. The other 3 are Kuala Lurah in the Brunei-Muara district to Limbang and the Puni and Labu Immigration post in the Temburong district to Limbang and Terusan respectively.

== History ==
The Sungai Tujoh area has been long claimed by the sultan of Brunei to constitute a part of the sultanate. It was divided in 1882, when the then sultan ceded the basin of the Baram to the White Rajah of Sarawak, an area of some 10,000 square miles (30,000 km^{2}), on condition of a perpetual annual payment of 6000 dollars.

The border was delineated in 1958 by the United Kingdom who then had sovereignty over the colony of Sarawak and was responsible for the external relations of the protectorate of Brunei. An immigration post was built in the 1960s to control the movement of goods and people between Miri and points west in Sarawak with Brunei. In 2003, ASEAN Bridge was constructed across the Baram River, connecting the city of Miri to Malaysian ICQS complex in Sungai Tujoh. Initially, it was a toll bridge. The bridge become toll-free in 2015.

The frequent traveller's card (FTC) was first implemented in 2005 at Sungai Tujoh. This enables residents from both countries to use their Mykad/Smart IC as a legal document for travel between the two countries instead of an international passport. As at December 2013 the FTC is no longer accepted.

== Transport ==
The main roads linking the ferry crossing towards the Malaysian border (11 kilometers) and towards Rasau bridge are surfaced.

There is a scheduled bus service that runs from Kuala Belait and terminates at the immigration post at Sungai Tujoh. Passengers have to clear customs and immigration on foot and take a separate bus to Miri.

== Gallery ==
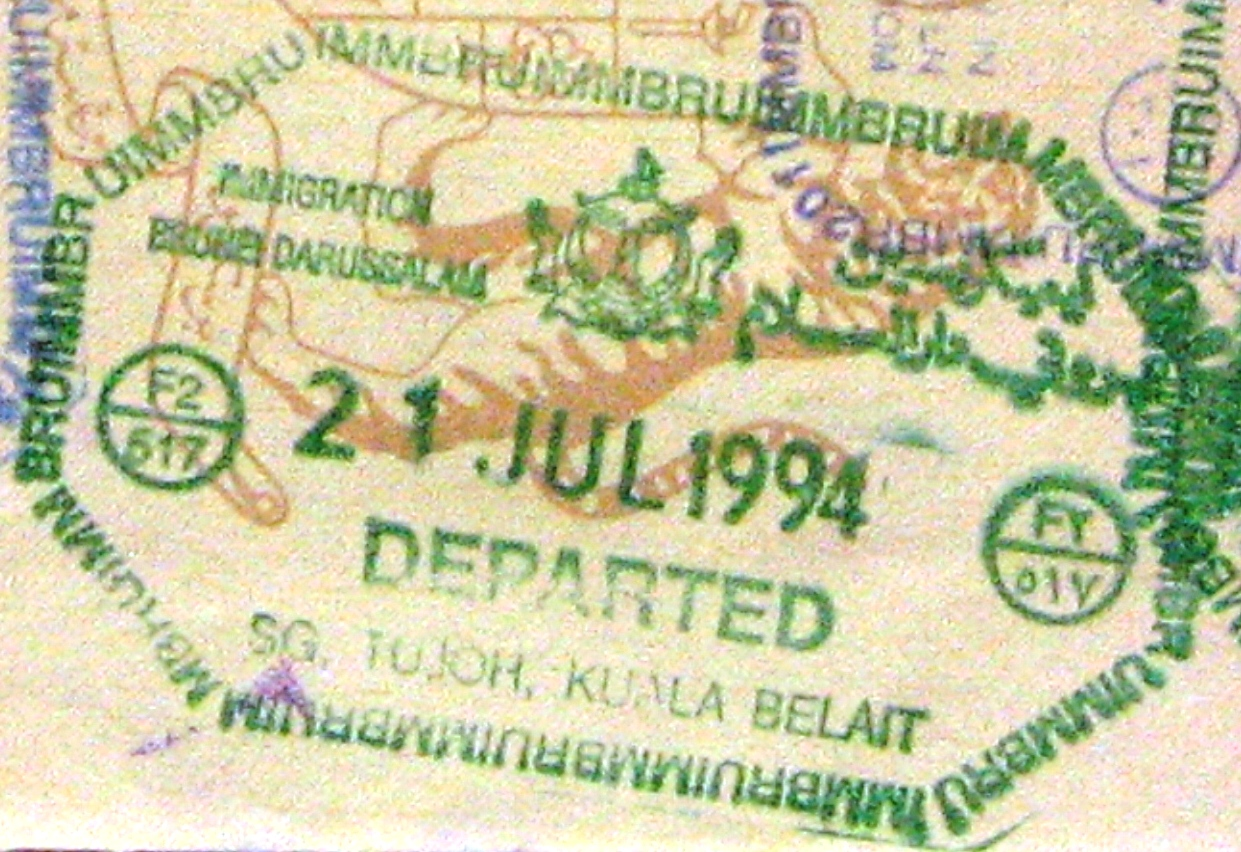
Brunei exit stamp from the Sg Tujoh border crossing

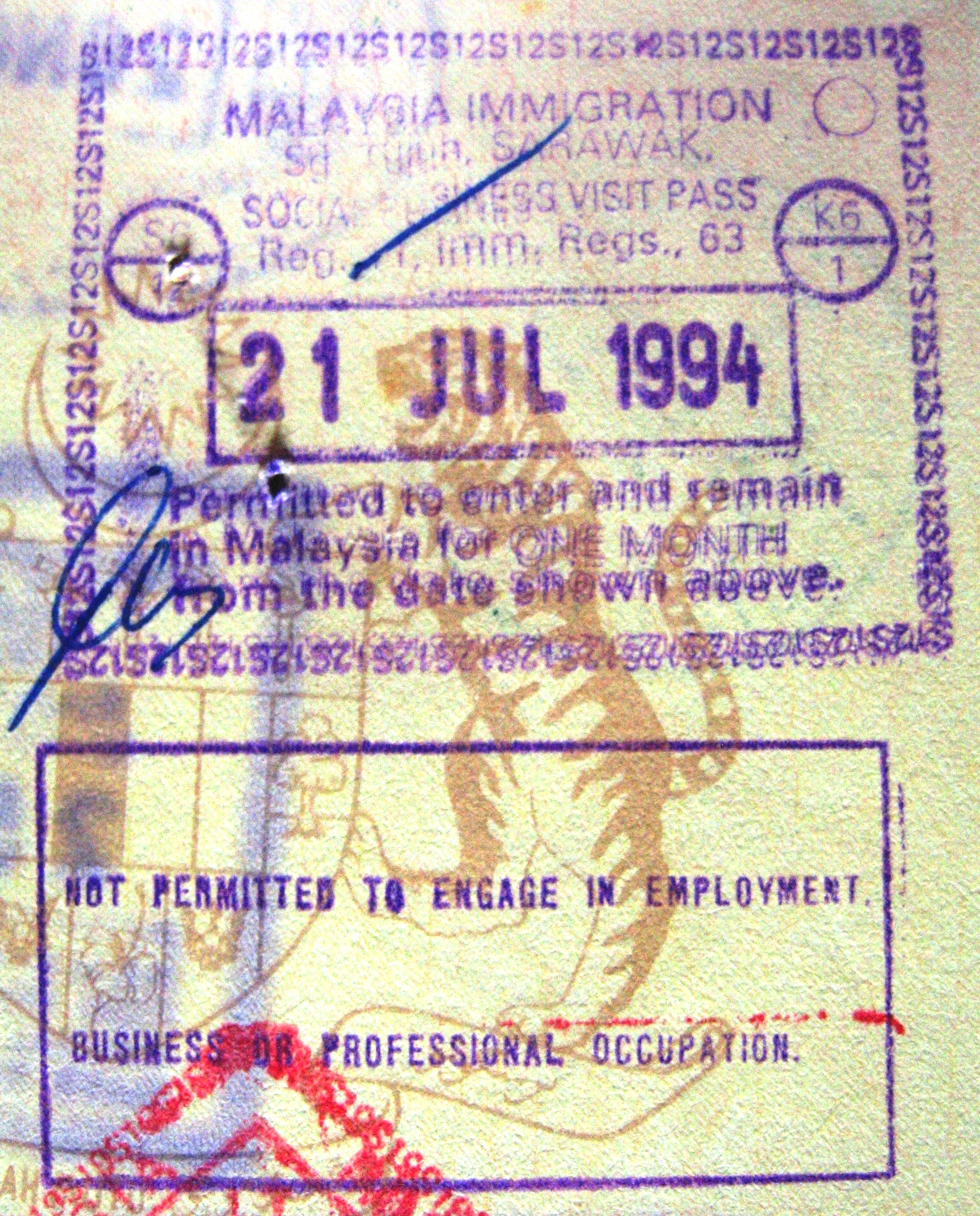
Malaysian entry stamp from its checkpoint.

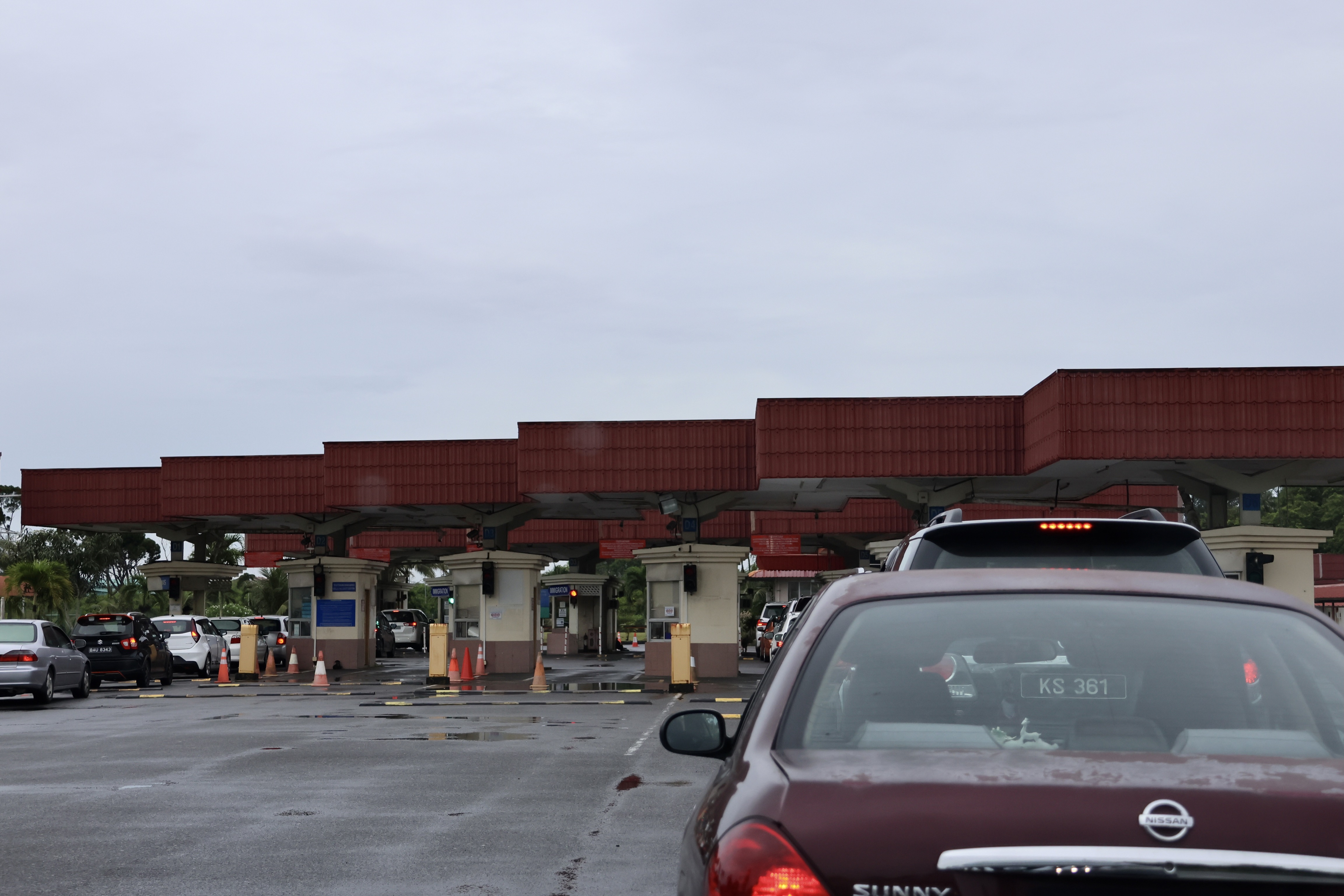
Border checkpoint of Brunei

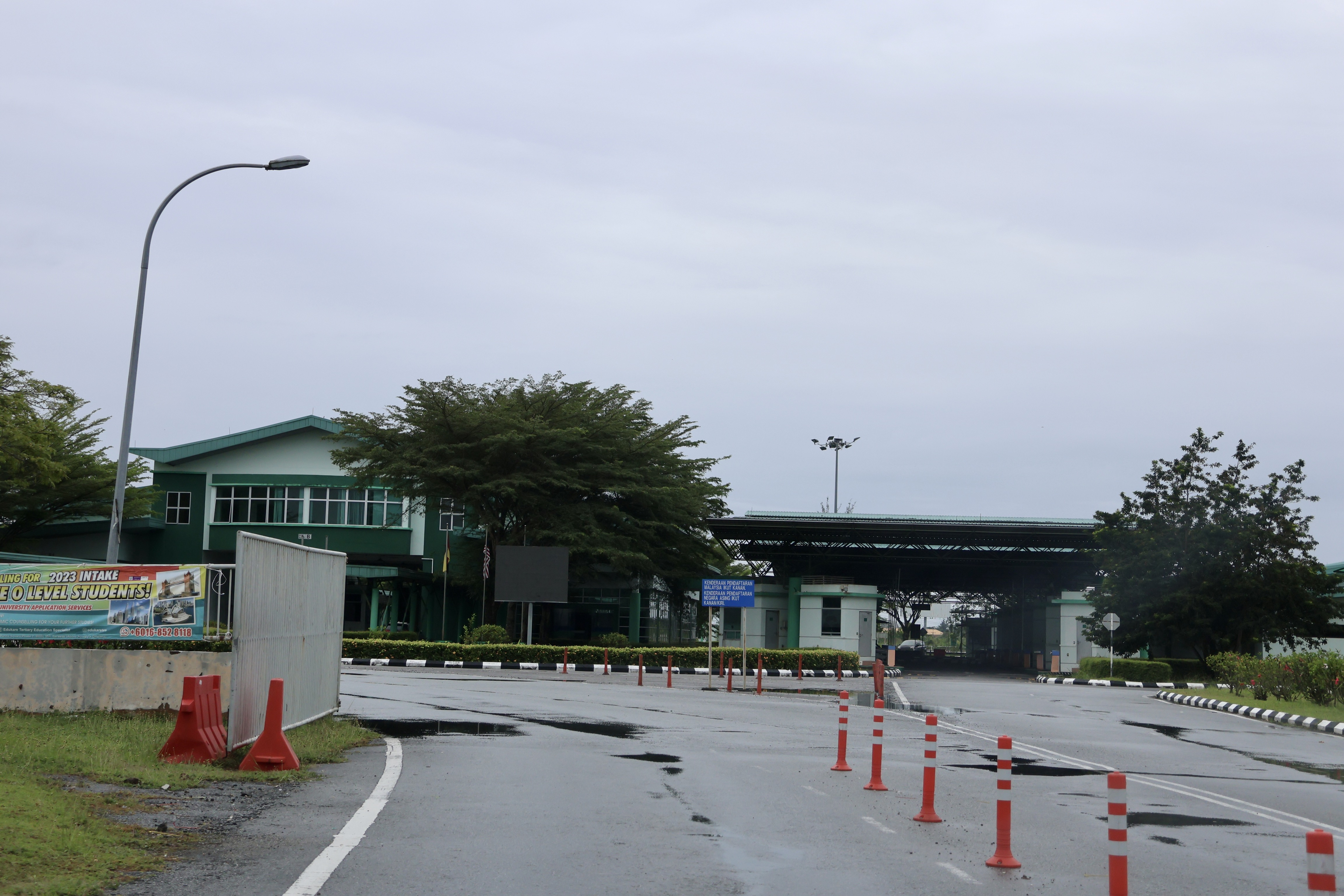
Border checkpoint of Malaysia

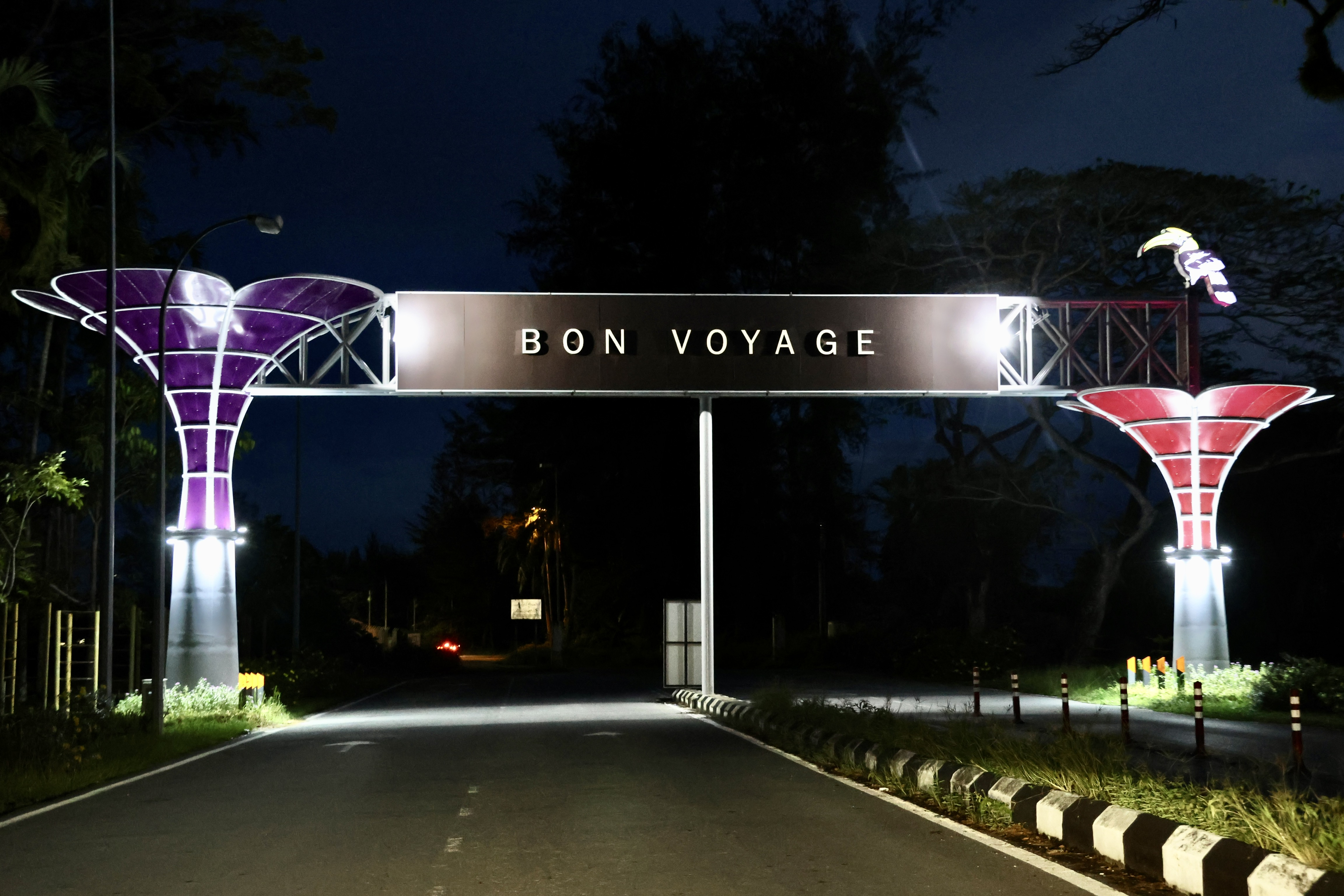
Farewell sign from Sarawak

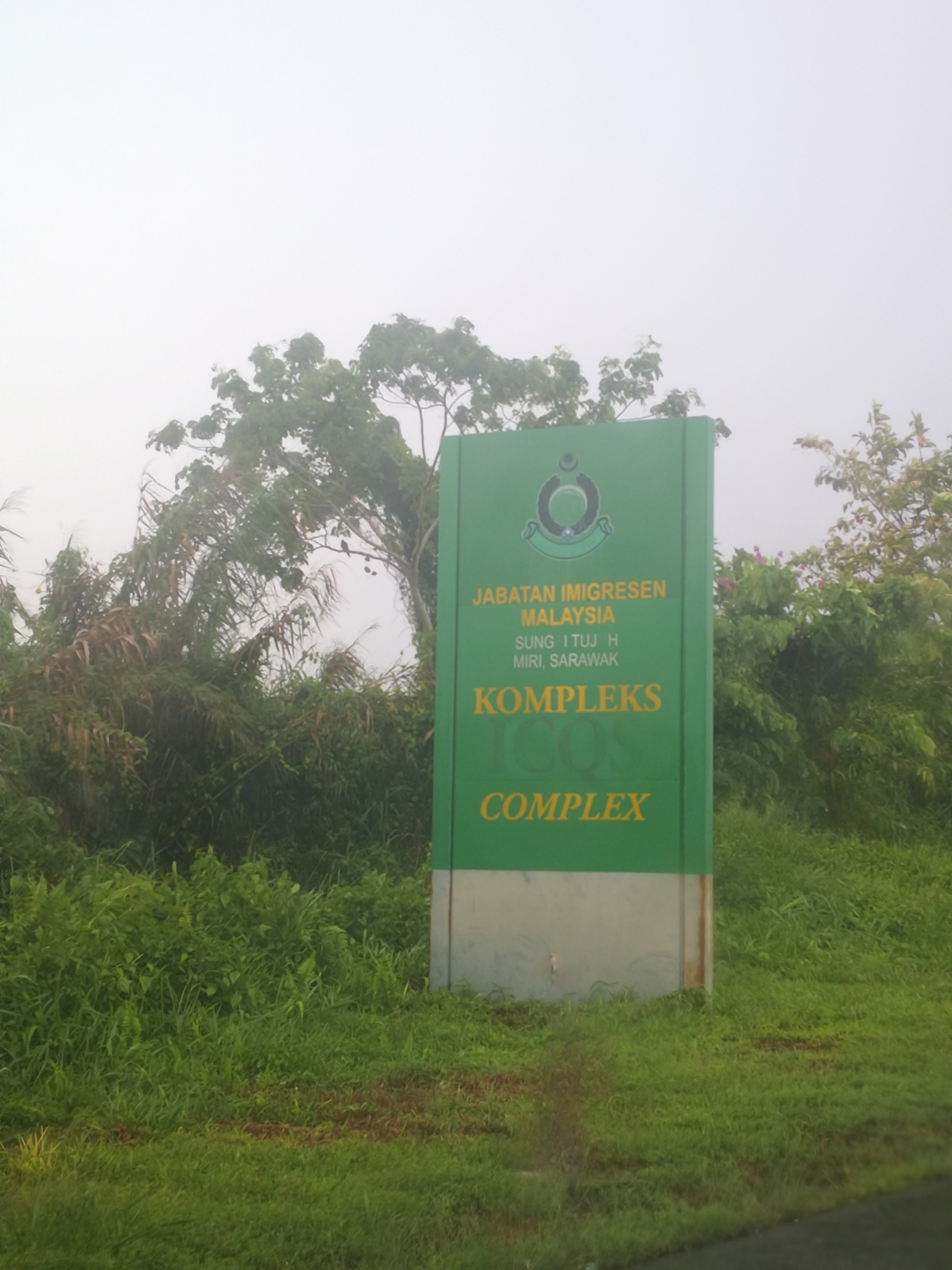
Green signboard showing Sungai Tujoh Milepost Checkpoint
