= Miri–Baram Highway =

Road in Malaysia

Federal Route 1-82
- Miri–Baram Highway
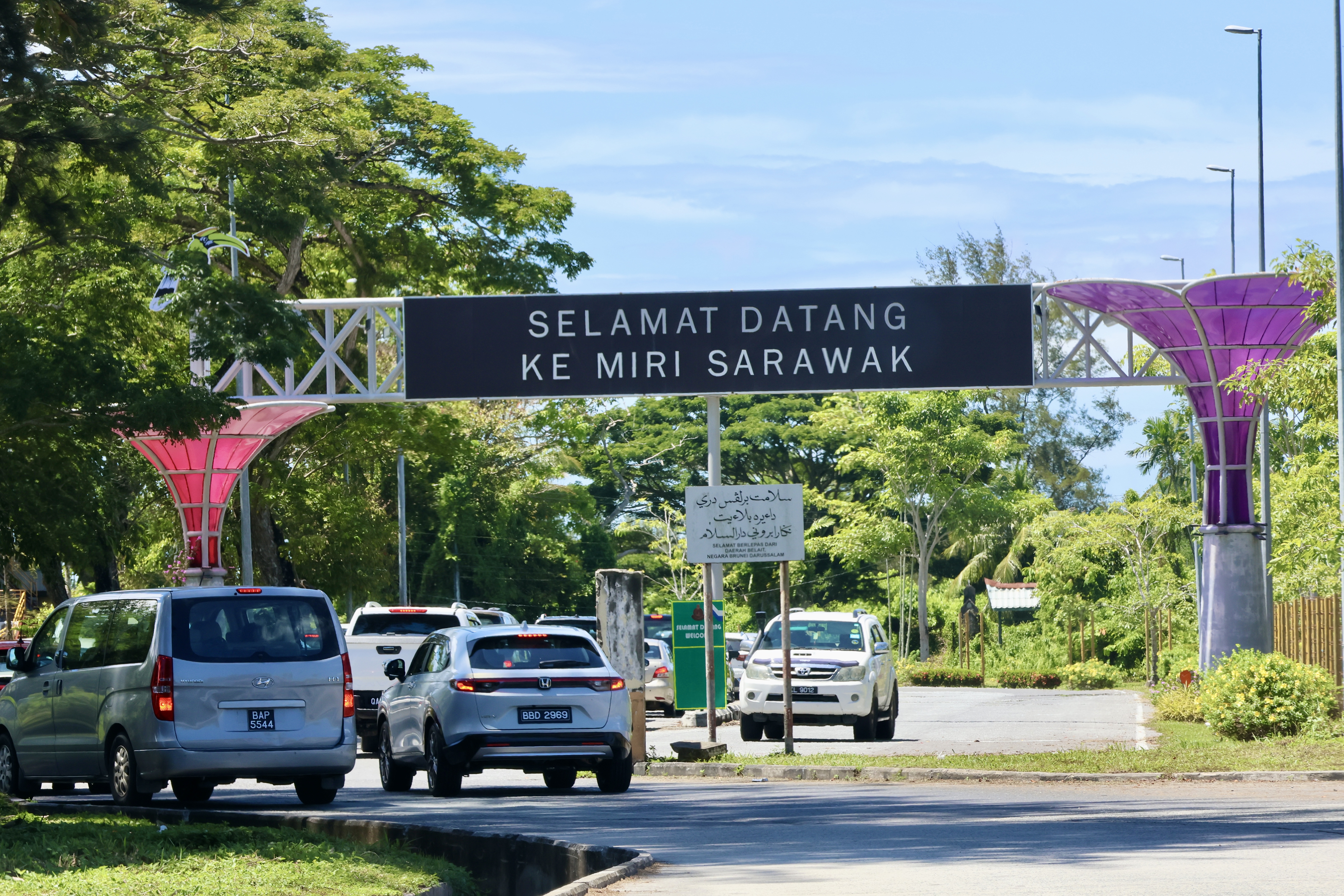

Route information
- Part of AH150
- Maintained by Malaysian Public Works Department

Major junctions
- Southwest end: Miri
- Northeast end: Sungai Tujuh checkpoint

Location
- Country: Malaysia
- Primary destinations: Lutong; Kuala Baram; Sungai Tujuh; Kuala Belait (Brunei)

Highway system
- Highways in Malaysia; Expressways; Federal; State

Miri–Baram Highway, Federal Route 1-82, also known as Jalan Kuala Baram-Sungai Tujuh, is a major highway in Miri Division, Sarawak, Malaysia. This highway is part of the Pan Borneo Highway AH 150.

== Main features ==
- Batang Baram Bridge or ASEAN Bridge
