= Wahau Kenyah language =

Austronesian language spoken on Borneo

Wahau Kenyah
- Native to: Indonesia
- Region: Borneo
- Native speakers: 9,000 (2007)
- Language family: Austronesian: Malayo-Polynesian; North Bornean; North Sarawakan; Kenyah; Wahau Kenyah

Language codes
- ISO 639-3: whk
- Glottolog: waha1238
- ELP: Wahau Kenya

Wahau Kenyah is an Austronesian language of Kalimantan.
