= Long Apu =

- Location within Borneo
- Coordinates: 3.13333°N 114.81667°E
- Country: Malaysia
- State: Sarawak
- Administrative Division: Marudi
- Elevation: 1,065 m (3,494 ft)

Long Apu is a longhouse in the mountainous interior of the Marudi division of Sarawak, Malaysia. It lies approximately 527.5 kilometres (328 mi) east-north-east of the state capital Kuching.

The village is located on the Baram River and is known for white water rafting events. The people are from the Kenyah, Uma' Pawa' sub-ethnic. Most of the villagers are dependent on the natural resources to sustain their daily needs, especially for food. They go hunting and cultivate paddy huma. The baram river is one of the main source to gain foods and money. There are a number of other small drainage close to this village which are able to be visited by using boats. If the Baram Dam hydroelectric project goes ahead, Long Apu will be one of the villages affected by the flooding of 389,000 hectares of jungle.

Neighbouring settlements include:

- Long Julan 4.1 kilometres (2.5 mi) southwest
- Long Tebanyi
- Long Anap 7.4 kilometres (4.6 mi) south
- Long Palai 9.5 kilometres (5.9 mi) south
- Long Selatong 11.1 kilometres (6.9 mi) north
- Lio Lesong 17.6 kilometres (10.9 mi) south
- Long San 18.9 kilometres (11.7 mi) north
- Long Akah 20.7 kilometres (12.9 mi) north
