= Kenyah languages =

Languages of Borneo

Kenyah
- Geographic distribution: Borneo
- Linguistic classification: Austronesian: Malayo-Polynesian; North Bornean; North Sarawakan; Kenyah

Language codes
- Glottolog: keny1280

The Kenyah languages are a group of half a dozen or so closely related languages spoken by the Kenyah peoples of Borneo. They are:

Kenyah proper (a dialect cluster, including Madang), Sebob, Tutoh (Long Wat), Wahau Kenyah, Uma’ Lung / Uma’ Lasan.

Ethnologue says that the Punan–Nibong languages are related to Uma’ Lasan, Glottolog that they are outside the Kenyah languages.

== Classification ==
Soriente (2008) proposes a Kayan-Kenyah grouping.

- Proto–Kayan-Kenyah
  - Kenyah
    - Upper Pujungan
    - Usun Apau
  - Penan
    - West Penan
    - East Penan
  - Kayanic
    - Lebuʼ Kulit
    - Mboh
    - Ngorek
    - Kayan

However, Smith (2015) rejects Soriente's grouping, and argues that Kenyah and Kayan are separate groups. Smith (2015) proposes the following classification.

- Proto-Kenyah
  - Highland
    - Highland A dialects: Lepoʼ Gah, Lepoʼ Sawa, Lepoʼ Laang, Lepoʼ Baha, Lepoʼ Maʼut, Lepoʼ Ké, Bakung, Lepoʼ Ndang
    - Highland B dialects: Lepoʼ Tau, Badeng, Umaʼ Lasan, Umaʼ Alim, Òma Lóngh
  - Lowland
    - Western Lowland dialects: Lebo' Vo'
    - Eastern Lowland dialects: Lebuʼ Kulit, Lebuq Timai, Umaʼ Pawa, Umaʼ Ujok, Umaʼ Kelap/Kelep
  - Penan-Sebop
    - Penan
    - Sebop

This classification of Kenyah languages was updated in a second publication, "Penan, Sebop, and Kenyah internal classification". There, it was shown that Penan and Sebop subgroup specifically with the Western-Lowland branch of Lowland Kenyah. This subgrouping was repeated in the dissertation, "The languages of Borneo: a comprehensive classification".

- Proto-Kenyah
  - Highland
    - Highland A dialects: Lepoʼ Gah, Lepoʼ Sawa, Lepoʼ Laang, Lepoʼ Baha, Lepoʼ Maʼut, Lepoʼ Ké, Bakung, Lepoʼ Ndang
    - Highland B dialects: Lepoʼ Tau, Badeng, Umaʼ Lasan, Umaʼ Alim, Òma Lóngh
  - Lowland
    - Western Lowland dialects: Lebo' Vo', Eastern Penan, Western Penan, Sebop
    - Eastern Lowland dialects: Lebuʼ Kulit, Lebuq Timai, Umaʼ Pawa, Umaʼ Ujok, Umaʼ Kelap/Kelep

== Supposed Austroasiatic influence ==
Kaufman (2018) notes that many Proto-Kenyah words (Smith 2017) are of likely Austroasiatic origin, including the following (Note: The Austroasiatic branch reconstructions are from Paul Sidwell's reconstructions).

- *saləŋ ‘black’ (cf. Proto-Palaungic *laŋ; Proto-Bahnaric *sla(ː)ŋ ‘clear, transparent’)
- *makaŋ ‘brave’
- *dəŋ ‘deaf’ (cf. Proto-Katuic *tuŋ; Mon daŋ)
- *pətat ‘divorce’ (cf. Mon tɛt)
- *naʔ ‘give’ (cf. Proto-South-Bahnaric *ʔaːn; Khmu ʔan)
- *biləŋ ‘green’
- *mə-bʰuh ‘help, assist’
- *laʔu ‘hungry’
- *adaŋ ‘must’
- *iəŋ ‘mosquito’
- *kabiŋ ‘left (side)’
- *pilaw ‘smooth’ (cf. Proto-Katuic *phiil)
- *biʔən ‘time’ (cf. Proto-Palaungic *bən ‘(future) time’)
- *nəmbam ‘tomorrow’
- *ait ‘sand’
- *luaŋ ‘seed’
- *su ‘grandchild’ (cf. Proto-Palaungic *cuʔ)

Vo words of likely Austroasiatic origin include:

- ɟen ‘bring’
- pikəp ‘narrow’
- mamoŋ ‘pregnant’
- imaʔ ‘rain’ (cf. Proto-Austroasiatic *gmaʔ)
- lañaʔ ‘fast/quick’ (cf. Proto-Vietic *m-laɲ; Proto-North-Bahnaric *raɲ)
- məɲon ‘sit’ (cf. Proto-Palaungic *-ɟɔn)
- ʄap ‘ten’ (cf. Khmer dɑp < Chinese?)
- sah ‘seed’ (cf. Proto-Palaungic *ʄak)
