= Long Seniai =

- Location within Borneo
- Coordinates: 3.45°N 114.95°E
- Country: Malaysia
- State: Sarawak
- Administrative Division: Marudi
- Elevation: 566 m (1,857 ft)

Long Seniai (also known as Long Sinei) is a longhouse settlement in the Marudi division of Sarawak, Malaysia. It lies approximately 553.7 kilometres (344 mi) east-north-east of the state capital Kuching.

Neighbouring settlements include:

- Long Merigong 11.3 kilometres (7.0 mi) east
- Long Tebangan 13.1 kilometres (8.1 mi) southwest
- Long Tap 18.3 kilometres (11.4 mi) southwest
- Long Akah 23.7 kilometres (14.7 mi) southwest
- Long Datih 24.1 kilometres (15.0 mi) east
- Long San 24.9 kilometres (15.5 mi) southwest
- Long Daloh 25.7 kilometres (16.0 mi) northwest
- Long Lellang 25.7 kilometres (16.0 mi) east
- Long Selatong 28.3 kilometres (17.6 mi) southwest
- Aro Kangan 28.5 kilometres (17.7 mi) east
