= Tutoh language =

Kenyah language spoken in Malaysia

Tutoh
- Long Wat
- Leboʼ Voʼ
- Native to: Malaysia
- Region: Borneo
- Native speakers: (600 cited 1981)
- Language family: Austronesian: Malayo-Polynesian; North Bornean; North Sarawakan; Kenyah; Tutoh

Language codes
- ISO 639-3: ttw
- Glottolog: long1406
- ELP: Lebo' Vo' Kenyah

Tutoh, also known as Long Wat, is a Kenyah language of Sarawak, Malaysia, spoken along the Tutoh River. It is spoken in the villages of Long Wat and in the Bornean city of Miri, where however most are shifting to Malay.
