= Long San =

- Location within Borneo
- Coordinates: 3.3°N 114.78333°E
- Country: Malaysia
- State: Sarawak
- Administrative Division: Miri
- Elevation: 215 m (705 ft)

Long San is a Kenyah settlement in the Marudi division of Sarawak, Malaysia. It lies approximately 530.4 kilometres (330 mi) east-north-east of the state capital Kuching.

This extensive village on the Baram river is the principal home of Kenyah culture (arts, crafts, music and dance) and has become increasingly popular as a tourist destination: the Long San Guesthouse provides accommodation for visitors. Access is either by boat or a 4½ hour drive from Miri by 4WD vehicle along old logging roads. If the Baram Dam hydroelectric project goes ahead, Long San will be one of the villages affected by the flooding of 389,000 hectares of jungle.

Neighbouring settlements include:

- Long Akah 1.9 kilometres (1.2 mi) north
- Long Tap 6.7 kilometres (4.2 mi) northeast
- Long Selatong 8.3 kilometres (5.2 mi) southeast
- Long Tebangan 11.9 kilometres (7.4 mi) northeast
- Long Apu 18.9 kilometres (11.7 mi) south
- Long Julan 22.3 kilometres (13.9 mi) south
- Long Seniai 24.9 kilometres (15.5 mi) northeast
- Long Anap 26.2 kilometres (16.3 mi) south
- Long Palai 28.4 kilometres (17.6 mi) south
- Long Daloh 29.9 kilometres (18.6 mi) north
