= Kampung Kenyah Badeng Senep =

Kampung Senap is a remote Kenyah Badeng village settlement in the hilly interior of Tinggang, Tubau, Sebauh, Bintulu division of Sarawak, Malaysia, elevates to 620 metres, not far from Tubau and Sebauh Sub-district. Kampung Senep is located at the upstream of Sungai Tinggang and Sungai Senep. The highest peak in Ulu Senep is called Gunung Lumut about 828 m located on the peak of Lumut Range not too far from Sungai Bekuyat and Sungai Kakus.

Travel to Senap involves a two-and-a-half-hour 4WD drive from Bintulu or Belaga; to get to Kampung Senep one has to take the Bintulu-Bakun road and look for the junction to KTS camp from KTS camp to Simpang Sg. Unan (right junction) it takes about 30 km using the logging road and from simpang Unan it is another 12 km (30 minutes) to reach Kampung Senep. The neighbouring settlements include:

- Rumah Alip 6.2 kilometres (10.3 mi) northwest
- Sungai Kalavang 8.6 kilometres (5.3 mi) southwest
- Sungai Kakus 15.0 kilometres north
- Nyulau 15.0 kilometres northwest
- Data Kakus 50.2 kilometres (31.2 mi) northwest
