= Sebop language =

Austronesian language spoken in Sarawak, Malaysia

Sebop
- Cebop
- Native to: Malaysia
- Region: Borneo
- Native speakers: (1,730 cited 1981)
- Language family: Austronesian: Malayo-Polynesian; North Bornean; North Sarawakan; Kenyah; Sebop

Language codes
- ISO 639-3: sib
- Glottolog: sebo1238

Sebob (Sebop, Cebop) is a Kenyah language of Sarawak.
