= Cahya Mata Sarawak =

Malaysian conglomerate

Cahya Mata Sarawak Berhad
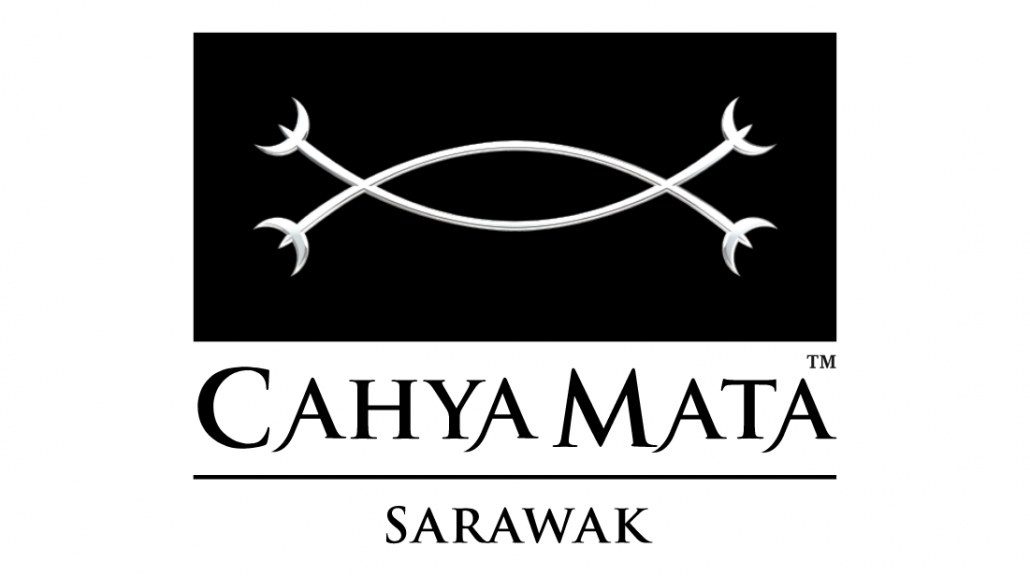

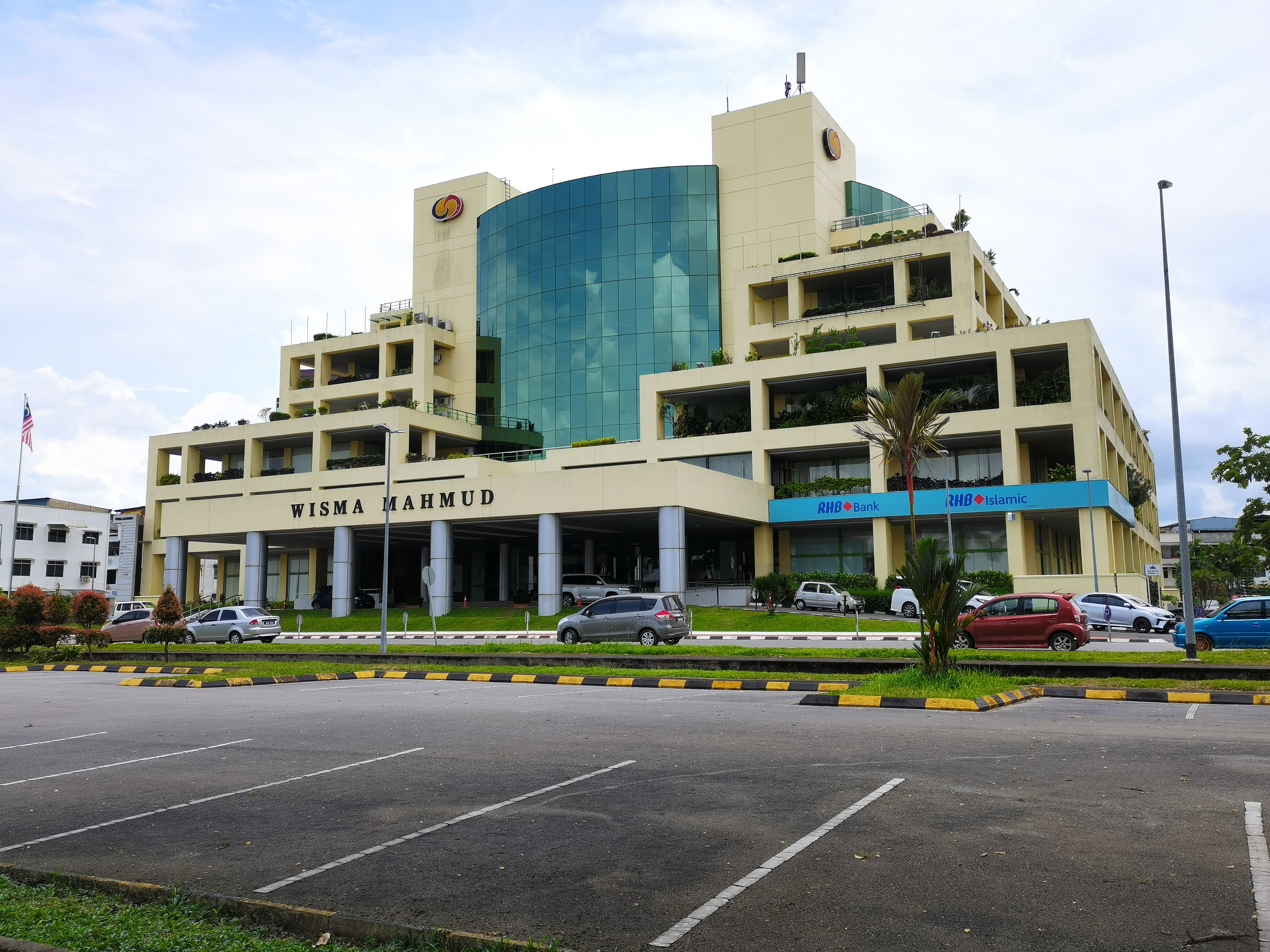
- Cahya Mata Sarawak headquarters at Jalan Sungai Sarawak
- Type: Public limited company
- Traded as: MYX: 2852
- ISIN: MYL2852OO001
- Industry: Cement manufacturing, construction materials, trading, construction, road maintenance, property development, financial services, smelting, telco infrastructure, education
- Predecessor: Cement Manufacturers Sarawak (1974–1996)
- Founded: 1974
- Founders: Bujang Mohd Nor; Mohd Amin Satem; Yahya Lampong; Philip Lee; Peter Koh; Nicholas Gunjew
- Headquarters: Level 6, Wisma Mahmud, Jalan Sungai Sarawak, 93100 Kuching, Sarawak, Malaysia
- Key people: Tan Sri (Dr.) Mohd Zahidi bin Haji Zainuddin, Group Chairman; Dato Sri Mahmud Abu Bekir Taib, Deputy Group Chairman; Dato Isaac Lugun, Group Managing Director; Shaun Mok Chek Wei, Group Chief Operating Officer; Syed Hizam Alsagoff, Group Chief Financial Officer
- Products: Industrial Products & Service
- Revenue: ▲MYR 1,712.24 mil (2018)
- Operating income: ▲MYR 409.61 mil (2018)
- Net income: ▲MYR 301.48 mil (2018)
- Number of employees: More than 2,750
- Website: www.cahyamata.com

Cahya Mata Sarawak Berhad (CMSB) (MYX: 2852) is a corporation listed on the Main Market of the Malaysian stock exchange, Bursa Malaysia. It is an investment holding company involved in Sarawak in manufacturing of cement and other construction materials, road construction and maintenance, laying of undersea pipelines, dam construction, smelting, property development, financial services, and education.

Cahya Mata Sarawak literally means "the light of Sarawak's eye" in the Malay language; "Cahya Mata" also figuratively means "the child of".

== History ==
Cahya Mata Sarawak old logo before its rebranding in October 2022.

On 8 October 1974, CMSB was incorporated as Cement Manufacturers Sarawak Sdn Bhd, at Power Street, Kuching. The first board meeting was held on 31 October 1974 by Sarawak state financial secretary Bujang Mohd Nor and chief executive of Sarawak Economic Development Corporation (SEDC) Mohd Amin Satem, with four others, including representatives from Sabah Economic Development Corporation (SEDCO). CMSB was jointly owned by SEDC and SEDCO on 50:50 basis. Bujang Mohd Nor and Mohd Amin Satem became the first directors on the company board.

In 1978, the company set up its first Portland cement manufacturing plant in Pending Industrial Estate, Kuching; Sarawak had previously imported Green Island cement from Hong Kong through Borneo Company Limited. In 1989, CMSB became the first Sarawak company listed on Bursa Malaysia main board.

In 1994, CMSB created subsidiary companies CMS Cement Sdn Bhd and CMS Properties Sdn Bhd. CMSB also acquired shares in three SEDC subsidiaries, namely Sara Kuari Sdn Bhd (where PPES Works (Sarawak) Sdn Bhd and PPES Premix Sdn Bhd were the subsidiaries of Sara Kuari); Steel Industry Sarawak Bhd; and PCMS Sdn Bhd. CMSB also acquired Sarawak Works Department premix plants. CMSB also acquired Archipelago Shipping (Sarawak) Sdn Bhd in 1996. Archipelago Shipping was later renamed as CMS Transportation Sdn Bhd. In November 2001, another company named Achi Jaya Services Sdn Bhd offered to acquire CMS Transportation Sdn Bhd for RM30 million. The transaction was completed in January 2003.

On 13 June 1996, the company changed its name to Cahya Mata Sarawak Berhad (literally means "Sarawak's favourite son"). The original blue of its logo was changed to yellow, red, and black, the colours of the Sarawak flag. The interlocking logo represents Yin and yang, reflecting the company's main activities at that time, infrastructure and investment.

On 26 December 2000, CMSB reached an agreement with peninsular Malaysia-based K&N Kenaga Sdn Bhd, whereby CMS futures and securities business were sold to Kenaga in exchange for 25% shares in Kenaga. On 1 May 2003, CMSB subsidiary, Utama banking group, was merged with RHB Bank to form RHB Group, in keeping with Bank Negara's policy of consolidating Malaysia's banking industry. Utama banking group obtained 32.8% of RHB Group shares during this merger. In 2007, Employees Provident Fund (EPF) purchased all the RHB shares owned by Utama banking group for RM 2.25 billion. In 2008, Utama banking group acquired CMS Roads and CMS Pavement Tech by offering shares to PPES Works (Sarawak) Sdn Bhd (a subsidiary of CMSB) and cash payments to SEDC. In 2009, Utama Banking Group disposed CMS Roads Sdn Bhd and CMS Pavement Tech Sdn Bhd to Putrajaya Perdana Bhd.

In 2010, CMSB sold Utama banking group to Petro Saudi International Ltd, an investment company based in Saudi Arabia for cash return. In the same year, CMSB ceased the operations of its loss-making ICT subsidiary company "I-system Group Berhad", acquired five years before. In 2011, CMSB reacquired CMS Roads and CMS Pavement Tech. In the same year, CMSB entered a joint venture with OM Materials Pte Ltd to operate ferrosilicon and manganese ferroalloys Smelter at Similajau Industrial Park. In 2013, CMSB entered a joint venture with Malaysian Phosphate Venture Sdn Bhd (MPV) and Arif Enigma Sdn Bhd (AESB) to form a company named Malaysian Phosphate Additives (Sarawak) Sdn Bhd (MPAS) at Similajau Industrial Park. In the same year, CMSB became top 100 Malaysian companies in terms of market capitalisation.

In 2014, CMSB worked with Germany-based Christian Pfeiffer Maschinenfabrik GmbH to develop a new cement grinding plant in Mambong. On 22 September 2014, first ferrosilicon slab was successfully produced by OM Materials ferrosilicon and manganese ferroalloys Smelter at Similajau Industrial Park. In 2015, CMSB increased its stake in the OM Materials ferroalloys plant in Samalaju by 5%. In 2016, CMSB subsidiary PPES Works (Sarawak) Sdn Bhd was involved in the construction of Datuk Temenggong Abang Kipali bin Abang Akip Interchange at Petra Jaya, Kuching. In 2017, CMSB collaborated with Leburaya Borneo Utara on using water jets and pressure bars in constructions of Pan Borneo Highway. On 9 March 2018, CMSB, Ibraco Berhad and the HELP Education Group signed an agreement to establish Tunku Putra-HELP International School (TPHIS). In the same year, CMS Cement Industries Sdn Bhd collaborated with UNIMAS Holdings Sdn Bhd on the development of concrete made from Portland limestone cement and Portland composite cement.

In October 2022, Cahya Mata Sarawak changed its logo.

== Corporate affairs ==
The company's revenue reached RM 814.6 million (US$196.7 million) in December 2021. In 2023, RAM Ratings (a rating agency established by the central bank of Malaysia) upgraded the company's outlook from stable to positive because of the phosphates manufacturing division due to open in mid-2023.

== Subsidiaries ==
=== PPES Works (Sarawak) Sdn Bhd ===
A joint venture with the Sarawak Economic Development Corporation (SEDC), a construction company in Sarawak has undertaken a wide range of civil engineering, building and utility works (including dams, undersea pipe lay and other water-related works) as well as road construction and road maintenance. It also holds a long-term concession from the Federal Government of Malaysia to maintain approximately 680 km (420 mi) of federal roads within Sarawak.

CMSB via PPES Works (Sarawak) Sdn Bhd (PPESW) sets a joint venture (jv) with Bina Puri Sdn Bhd (BPSB) via an associate company, PPESW BPSB JV Sdn Bhd. its role is the main contractor for Sg Awik to Bintangor Junction in work package contract (WPC06). It is one of the 11 Pan Borneo highway work packages and the length of the highway is 64.48 km (40.07 mi).

PPESW BPSB JV Sdn Bhd is flanked together with Endaya TRC PK JV Sdn Bhd (WPC05; Batang Skrang to Sg. Awik) and HSL DMIA JV Sdn Bhd (WPC07; Bintangor Junction to Sg. Kua Bridge).

=== CMS Works Sdn Bhd ===
This company and its subsidiaries undertake general construction, specialist infrastructure projects, road maintenance concessions and road laying and rehabilitation works. This company also owns a fleet of construction and road maintenance equipment, as well as vehicles to meet the division's needs.

=== CMS Roads Sdn Bhd ===
This company maintains approximately 5,400 km (3,400 mi) of state roads in Sarawak under a long-term concession. Using an internationally recognised road management and maintenance system, its scope of works includes maintenance and repair of road surfaces as well as road markings and furnishings, such as signage and lighting.

=== CMS Pavement Tech Sdn Bhd ===
This company is a specialised provider of construction, maintenance and rehabilitation services for road pavements. This includes processes such as cement stabilisation, pavement profiling and the recycling of existing pavements in an environmentally friendly manner. These processes offer cost savings, speed of construction and improved pavement performance and life.

=== CMS Modular Housing Sdn Bhd ===
CMS Modular Housing has a plant in Sejingkat, Kuching that supplies pre-fabricated steel-framed housing components for the construction of modular houses. In 2003, the subsidiary secured a five-year building contract with Daya Perumahan Sdn Bhd (Daya Perumahan is a unit set up by Housing Development Corporation Sarawak) to supply roofing materials for low-cost housing development projects. The company supplied roofing materials for 1,098 low-cost houses in Bandar Samariang in Petra Jaya, Kuching. CMS Modular also supplied wall materials to the Bandar Samariang Phase I project. This subsidiary achieved RM 4.1 million in sales in 2003, however with operating losses of RM 14.3 million due to high-interest rates and depreciation costs. CMS decided to wind down this company's involvement in housing development while focusing on selling insulation products and materials.
