= Mainstream Kenyah language =

Language of Borneo

Kenyah
- Lepo’
- Bakung
- Native to: Indonesia, Malaysia
- Region: Borneo
- Ethnicity: Kenyah
- Native speakers: 50,000 (2007–2013)
- Language family: Austronesian: Malayo-Polynesian; North Bornean; North Sarawakan; Kenyah; Kenyah

Language codes
- ISO 639-3: xkl
- Glottolog: main1275

Mainstream Kenyah, also known as Usun Apau and Bakung, is a Kenyah dialect cluster of North Kalimantan, Indonesia, and Sarawak, Malaysia. Dialects fall into four clusters:

- Lepo’ Tau, Lepo’ Bem, Uma’ Jalan, Uma’ Tukung
- Lepo’ Ke, Lepo’ Kuda
- Lepo’ Maut, Lepo’ Ndang, Badeng (Madang)
- Bakung, Lepo’ Tepu’ (Lepo Teppu’).

== Phonology ==
=== Consonants ===
		Labial	Dental	Alveolar	Palatal	Velar	Glottal
Plosive/ Affricate	voiceless	p	t̪		t͡ʃ	k	ʔ
Plosive/ Affricate	voiced	b		d	d͡ʒ	g	
Fricative				s			
Nasal		m		n	ɲ	ŋ	
Trill				r			
Approximant		w		l	j		

- Sounds /p, t̪/ can also occur as geminated [pː, t̪ː] or as unreleased in word-final [p̚, t̪̚].

=== Vowels ===
	Front	Central	Back
Close	i		u
Mid	ɛ	ə	ɔ
Open		a	

- /i/ can also occur as lax [ɪ].
- Sounds /a, u/ can also be heard as long [aː, uː].
