= Long Busang =

Coordinates: 1.872°N 114.314°E

Long Busang (LOBUS)
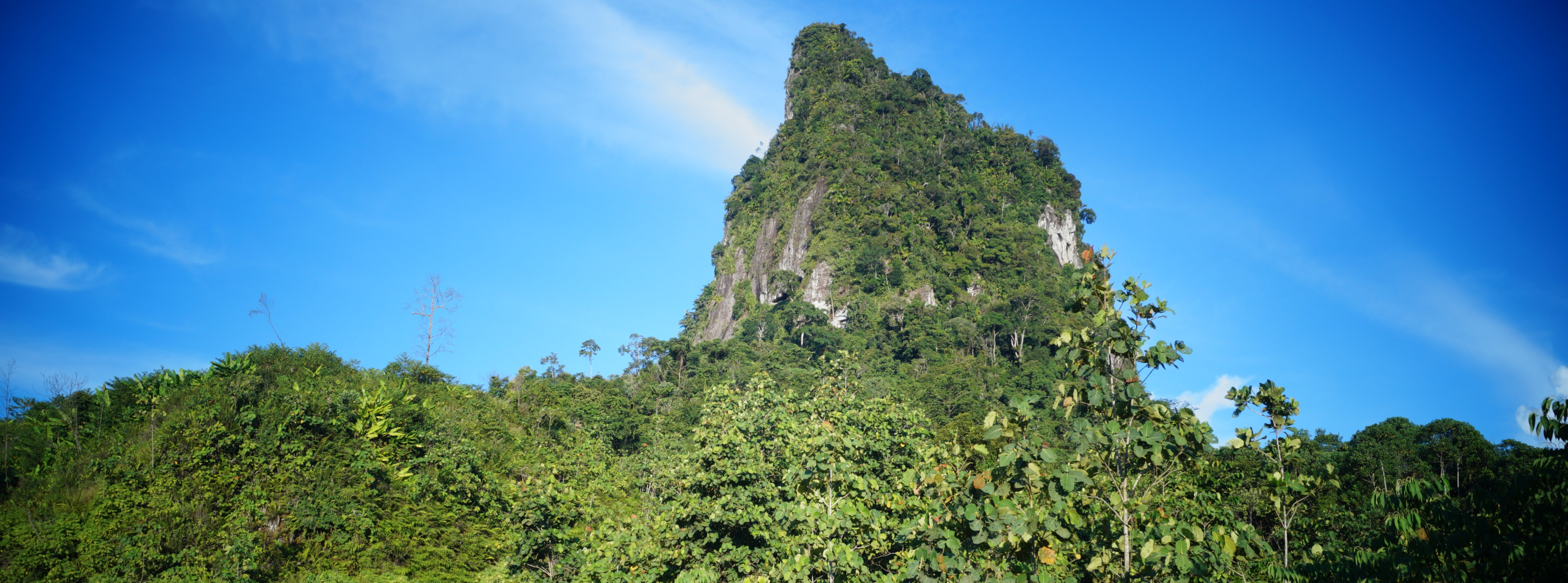
- Batu Mado in Long Busang
- Interactive map of Long Busang (LOBUS)
- Country: Malaysia
- State: Sarawak

Long Busang (Lobus) is a settlement in the rural area of Bukit Mabong, Sarawak, Malaysia (it was once part of the Belaga district). The Kenyah Badeng people dominate this settlement in Ulu Sungai Balui.

Long Busang can be reached by boat, 4-wheel drive, or helicopter. The village is very remote, and it can take significantly longer than 5 hours to travel from Kapit or Bakun Dam.

== Culture and Economy ==
The harvest celebration, also known as Rame o'o Ajau or Rame Lepa Ajau, will be celebrated at Osey Bi'o, the head leader's veranda. Typically, during the ceremony, they will speak (pekatuk) and dance (kancet). They now have two head leaders as a result of the population growth.

Locals here engage in the KEBANA celebration, also known as the Kenyah Badeng National Association, an organization that unites the Kenyah Badeng tribe in Sarawak. It has been held every year in a different location chosen by the association. The last time, Long Busang was the host, was in 2014.

The majority of residents in Long Busang are farmers. They typically work a variety of occupations to cover their living expenses.

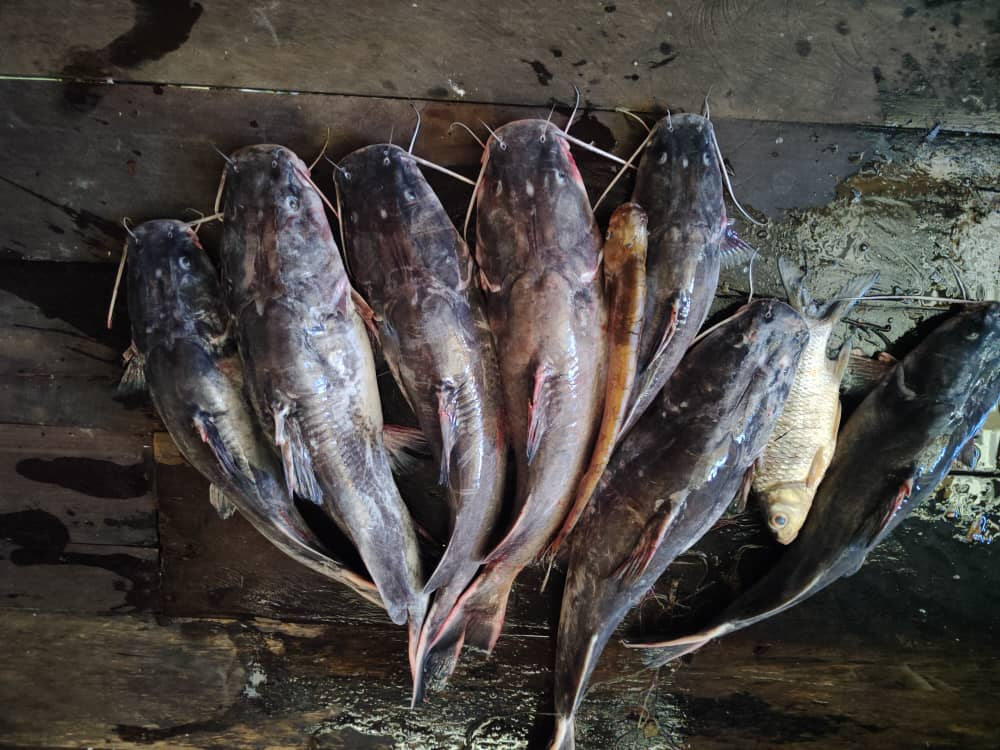
Most economic activity in Long Busang

== Languages ==
The majority of the villagers speak Kenyah Badeng. Other widely spoken languages include Kenyah Bakung, Kenyah Lepo' Tau, Iban, Indonesia, and Malay. Most of them have been multilingual since they were children.

== Religion ==
Long Busang's original religion is no longer practiced. Before Long Busang was founded, the majority of them were Christians. However, it is thought that just a handful of Bungans still practice their faith.

The majority of Kenyahs, like those in other Kenyah villages, are Christians, although others practice Islam.[2] Religious processions are free to take place in the community.[3] The Long Busang church (BEM Long Busang) is located upstream at Oma' Daya, whereas the mosque is located downstream at Oma' Aba'.

== Utilities ==
=== Education ===
- SK Long Busang

=== Healthcare ===
- Klinik Long Busang
