= Umaʼ Lasan language =

Kayan language spoken on Borneo

Umaʼ Lasan
- Native to: Malaysia, Indonesia
- Region: Borneo
- Native speakers: (6,000 cited 1981–2006)
- Language family: Austronesian: Malayo-Polynesian; North Bornean; North Sarawakan; Kenyah; Umaʼ Lasan

Language codes
- ISO 639-3: Either: xky – Umaʼ Lasan (Sarawak, Malaysia) ulu – Umaʼ Lung (East Kalimantan and North Kalimantan, Indonesia)
- Glottolog: uppe1425
- ELP: Uma' Lung

Umaʼ Lasan (Western Kenyah) is a Kayan language of Borneo. Umaʼ Lung is marginally intelligible with the other varieties.
