= Baram Dam =

Dam in Sarawak, Malaysia

- Site of the proposed Baram Dam on the island of Borneo.
- Official name: Empangan Baram
- Country: Malaysia
- Location: Sarawak
- Coordinates: 3°22′59″N 114°34′4″E
- Purpose: Power
- Status: Proposed
- Construction cost: RM4 billion

Dam and spillways
- Type of dam: Gravity, roller-compacted concrete
- Impounds: Baram River
- Height: 162 m (531 ft)
- Length: 685 m (2,247 ft)
- Elevation at crest: 180 m (591 ft)

Reservoir
- Catchment area: 8,966 km^{2} (3,462 mi^{2})
- Surface area: 389 square kilometres (150 mi^{2}; 96,000 acres)
- Normal elevation: 178 m (584 ft)

Power Station
- Turbines: 4 x Francis-type
- Installed capacity: 1,200 MW

The Baram Dam, also known as Baram 1 Dam and Baram Hydro-electric Dam Project (Malay: Empangan Baram) is a proposed gravity dam on the Baram River in Sarawak, Malaysia. The site of the dam is 250 kilometres (160 miles) inland from Miri, the second largest city in Sarawak. The dam is part of the Sarawak Corridor of Renewable Energy and, if completed, would support a 1,200 MW power station. In November 2015, the Sarawak Chief Minister Tan Sri Adenan Satem announced that the Sarawak government had decided to shelf the Baram Dam because the people in Baram did not welcome the plan.

== Design ==
If built, the dam will be 162 metres (531 ft) tall and its reservoir will cover an area of 389 square kilometres (150 mi^{2}; 96,000 acres). The length of the dam at its crest will be 685 m (2,247 ft). A 70 metres (230 ft) tall saddle dam about 5 km (3.1 mi) southwest of the main dam will help retain the reservoir.

== Background ==
Baram 1 is one of 12 dams to be constructed in Sarawak and is being developed by Sarawak Energy. It is the next to be constructed after Murum Dam's reservoir impounded in 2013. Snowy Mountains Engineering Corporation is carrying out the design of the dam and 1,200 MW power station. In 2010, Germany-based Fichtner GmbH & Co. KG completed a feasibility study on the dam and power station. In November 2012, the Social and Environmental Impact Assessment (SEIA) for the project began. On 11 July 2014, the Sarawak state government unofficially approved the dam project although the SEIA report had not been completed. As of 17 December 2014, Sarawak Energy announced that it has yet to complete a comprehensive feasibility study and SEIA report due to ongoing protests against the Baram dam project.

Corruption has also been alleged, the Baram MP Jacob Dungau Sagan, formerly the Malaysian Deputy Minister of International Trade and Industry, was accused of supporting the project after obtaining RM63 million worth of contracts and timber concessions for the Baram district. He dismissed the accusation as a political ploy ahead of parliamentary elections.

== Impacts ==
=== Displacement ===
At least 20,000 people from 25 longhouses would be displaced if the dam is built, according to International Rivers. The feasibility study estimated that 6,000 to 8,000 people from 32 longhouses would be displaced. This number has also been verified by Miri Resident's office. The displaced communities mostly consisted of Kenyah, Kayan, and Penan communities. In the upcoming SEIA, a household register would be developed for proposed resettlement of the displaced communities. According to Sarawak Energy, the dam project would accelerate the development of Baram township and to provide work opportunities and better infrastructure development for the local communities.

With the threat of displacement, protests by locals and international anti-dam groups against the dam have been common and have stalled preliminary construction such as access-road building. In September 2012, a document containing thousands of signatures was submitted to Sarawak's Chief Minister office. However, also in 2012, the Federation of Orang Ulu Association Malaysia, a group representing local ethnic groups dwelling near the site, pledged their support to the project.

A group of 300 indigenous people staged a demonstration during IHA 2013 World Congress held by International Hydropower Association (IHA) at Borneo Convention Centre Kuching in May 2013. Written demands were submitted to executive director of IHA, Richard M Taylor. On 23 October 2013, native protesters disrupted 30 Sarawak Energy Berhad (SEB) workers who were doing geological studies at the proposed construction area. Road blockades have impacted construction, one blockade has been erected near Long Lama and another one was erected near the proposed dam construction site. The blockade continued for nearly one year until 21 October 2014 when 50 police personnel dismantled the "KM15" blockade at Long Kesseh. Another blockade was re-erected few hours later. On 23 October 2014, the protesters celebrated one-year anniversary of the continuing blockade.

In November 2015, the late Sarawak Chief Minister Tan Sri Adenan Satem said that the Sarawak government had decided that the Baram Dam project had been shelved, though this is described as "temporary".

== See also ==
- List of power stations in Malaysia
- Environmental impact of reservoirs
- Indigenous rainforest blockades in Sarawak
