= Ulu Baram =

Ulu Baram is a remote area of Sarawak in Malaysia. It is an encased alluvial plain, created in part by the Baram River.

The forest is certified for logging. Most of Ulu Baram belongs to the traditional area of the Orang Ulu (Upriver People), a collective name that includes the Penan people (about 10,000 overall), Kayan, Kenyah, Saban, Punan and Kelabit. There has been large-scale logging and subsequent creation of oil palm or monoculture acacia (used for paper) estates within the surrounding area, which continues despite the protracted protests of the indigenous inhabitants who claim these commercial activities are encroaching into their ancestral land and destroying their livelihood.

It is thought that this part of Sarawak may be the prime habitat for the very rare Hose's civet (Diplogale hosei), a small carnivore endemic to the montane forests of northern Borneo.
