= Long Anap =

- Location within Borneo
- Coordinates: 3.06667°N 114.81667°E
- Country: Malaysia
- State: Sarawak
- Administrative Division: Marudi
- Elevation: 518 m (1,699 ft)

Long Anap is a longhouse and settlement in the Telang Usan district of Sarawak, Malaysia. It lies approximately 525.2 kilometres (326 mi) east-north-east of the state capital Kuching, in the upper reaches of the Baram River.

The village is located on the Baram River between Long Palai (upstream) and Long Julan (downstream), near the top of the area known as the Middle Baram. There is a longhouse and a school in the village. A logging road links the village to Long Silat and K10 camp.

The residents of this settlement are members of the Kenyah tribe, specifically the Kenyah Lepo' Sawa' sub-ethnic group. A tall structure called Belawing with flags has been erected in front of the longhouse. Half of its population has moved to form a new village called Long Tebanyi. If the Baram Dam hydroelectric project goes ahead, Long Anap will be one of the villages affected by the flooding of 389,000 hectares of jungle.

Neighbouring settlements include:

- Long Palai 2.6 kilometres (1.6 mi) southeast
- Long Julan 4.1 kilometres (2.5 mi) northwest
- Long Apu 7.4 kilometres (4.6 mi) north
- Long Taan 17.5 kilometres (10.9 mi) southeast
- Long Selatong 18.5 kilometres (11.5 mi) north
- Long San 26.2 kilometres (16.3 mi) north
- Long Moh 27.8 kilometres (17.3 mi) east
- Long Akah 28.1 kilometres (17.5 mi) north
