= Kenyah people =

Indigenous people of Borneo

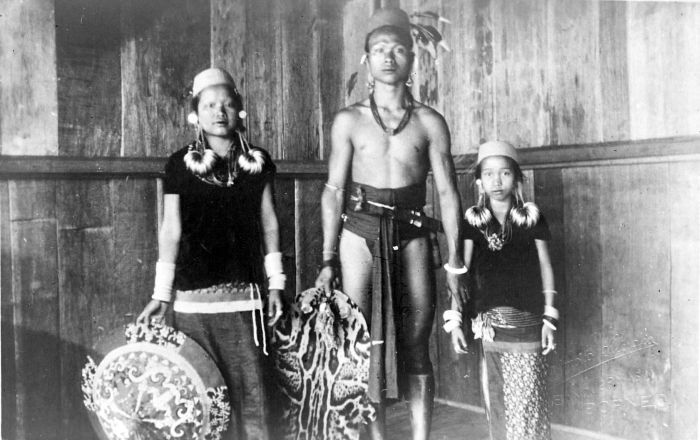
- A young Kenyah family in Sarawak pre-1944.

Total population
- 69,256 (year 2000 - Malaysia and Indonesia) 72,000 (year 2023 - Malaysia and Indonesia )

Regions with significant populations
- Borneo
- Malaysia (Sarawak): 60,000 (2020)
- Indonesia (East Kalimantan): 40,000 (2020)

Languages
- Kenyah languages (Mainstream Kenyah), Sarawak Malay, Standard Malay, English and Indonesian

Religion
- Christianity (Majority 94,27%), Bungan (Folk religion), Islam

Related ethnic groups
- Bagai people, Kayan people, Penan people

The Kenyah people are an indigenous, Austronesian-speaking people of Borneo, living in interior North and East Kalimantan, Indonesia and Sarawak, Malaysia. Categorised as a part of the Dayak people, they are similar to their neighbours, the Kayan people, with which they are grouped together with the Bahau people under the Apo Kayan people group.

== Culture and economy ==
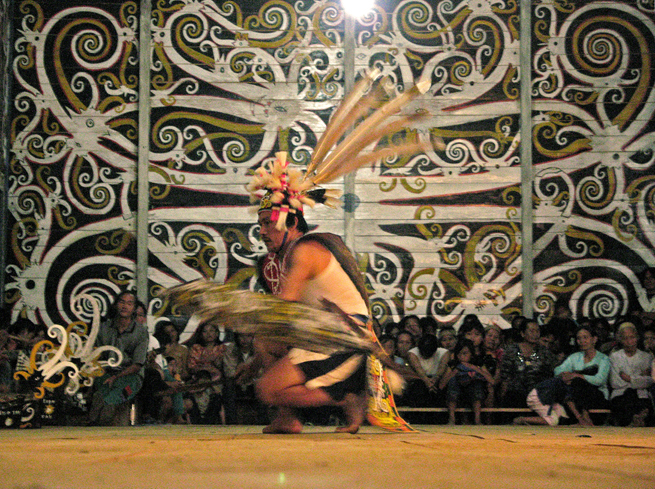
Kenyah dance.

The Kenyah people, traditionally being swidden agriculturalists and living in longhouses (uma dado'), is an umbrella term for over 40 sub-groups that mostly share common migration histories, customs, and related dialects. Kenyah people lived in longhouses a small communities. Each longhouse consists of families who choose their own leader (headman). When they have an event or celebration such as harvest festival, they will normally use the longhouse verandah (oseh bi'o) to gather and deliver speeches to guide their youngsters. Normally this harvest festival celebration (tau bio Ramay o o Ajau, pelepek uman) is a major festival because most of them are still farmers.

Kenyah people are very creative. They compose their popular songs and melody such as Lan e Tuyang, Kendau bimbin, Ilu Kenyah Kua Lo Te'a, Pabat Pibui, Atek Lan, and Leleng Oyau Along Leleng. Popular traditional Kenyah musical instruments are such as jatung utang (wooden xylophone), sampe (a type of guitar), sampe bio (single-stringed bass), lutong (a four- to six-string bamboo tube zither) and keringut (nose flute).

== Religion ==
Christianity is the predominant religion of Kenyah people, with the majority belonging to the Evangelical Protestanism. Before the arrival of Christian missionaries, the Kenyah people practice a traditional form of animism called 'Adat Pu'un'. During the initial introduction of Christianity by Christian & Missionary Alliance and Borneo Evangelical Mission, traditional beliefs and practices were revitalized and this form was called 'Bungan Malan Peselong Luan' movement. Today, there are only a small number of Kenyah people who still practice the Bungan faith. It is believed that a person will ascend to Alo Malau (seven heavens) with their ancestors (tepun) after death.

== Population ==
Statistical figures, based on the Indonesian and Malaysian national censuses collected in 2000, recorded a total of 44,350 Kenyah people in East Kalimantan, Indonesia and 24,906 in Sarawak, Malaysia.

The Kenyahs traditionally inhabit the remote Baram Lio Matoh, Long Selaan, Long Moh, Long Anap, Long Mekaba, Long Jeeh, Long Belaong, Long San, Long Silat, Long Tungan, Data Kakus, Data Surau, Data Senap, Long Dungan, Long Busang, Long Beyak, Tubau, Bintulu, Miri, Apau Koyan resettlement for Bakun Dam, Long Bulan, Long Jawe, Dangang, Long Bangan, Long Sah B(Uma Kelep), Long Urun, Sambop Long Semutut, Long Tebulang, Long Lawen, Long Unan and Belaga regions in Sarawak, Malaysia and the remote Apau Kayan, Bahau (Bau), Benua Lama, Benua Baru and Mahakam regions in North Kalimantan and East Kalimantan, Indonesia.

Kenyah people are divided into various lepo'/lebo' (tribes/clans) including the Uma Bakah, Lepo Anan, Lepo Tau, Lepu Jalan, Lepo' Tepu, Uma Kelep(Lebuq Timai), Uma Ujok, Uma Pawa', Seping, Sebop, Badeng, Jamok, Lepo Agak, Bakung (Long Singut), Uma Kulit, Uma Alim, Lebuq Timai, Uma Lasan, Lepo Ma-ut, Sambop, Lepo Ke', Lepo Ngao, Ngurek, Long Ulai, Long Tikan, Long Sabatu, Lepo Ga, Lepo Dikan, Lepo' Bem, Lepo' Embo' and Lepo Pua.

Inside the boundaries of Samarinda, Borneo's most populous city, most of the Kenyah people reside in the village of Budaya Pampang, North Samarinda. They migrated from Bulungan since 1967, and Pampang has been declared by East Kalimantan government as a cultural village in 1991. Numerous cultural events have been held regularly there.

== Sub-ethnic groups ==
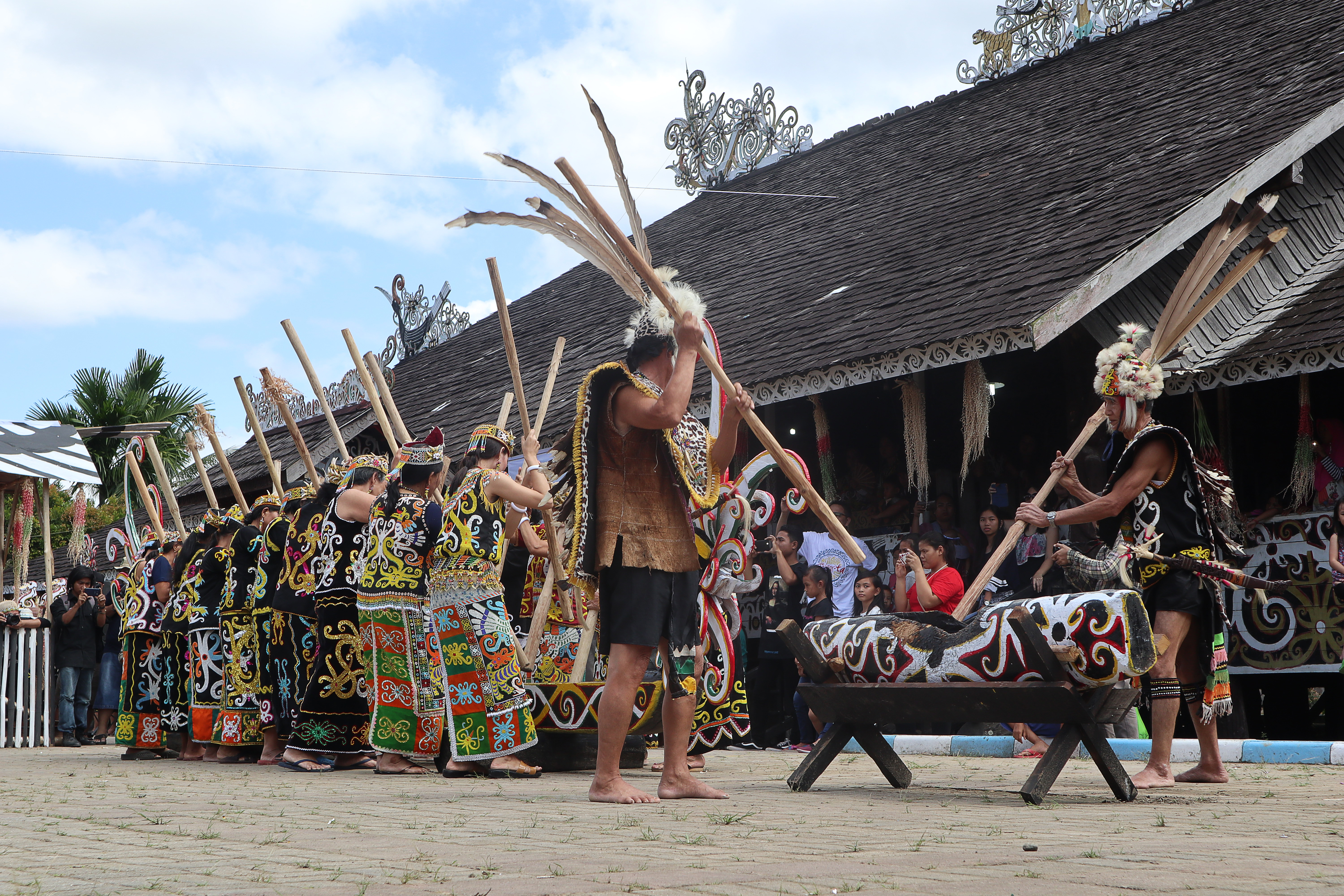
Traditional folk dance during Kenyah Cultural Festival in Budaya Pampang, Samarinda, East Kalimantan, Indonesia

Languages of Kalimantan, with the Kenyah sub-dialects in North Kalimantan and East Kalimantan are being labelled as Wahau Kenyah (66) and mainstream Kenyah (73)

The Kenyah people are also divided into various sub-ethnic groups such as:-

- Kenyah Badeng or Madang
- Kenyah Bakung
- Kenyah Jamok
- Kenyah Lepo' Abong
- Kenyah Lepo' Aga
- Kenyah Lepo' Anan
- Kenyah Lepo' Bam
- Kenyah Lepo' Gah
- Kenyah Lepo' Jalan
- Kenyah Lepo' Ke'
- Kenyah Lepo' Kulit
- Kenyah Lepo' Maut
- Kenyah Lepo' Sawa'
- Kenyah Lepo' Tau'
- Kenyah Lepo' Tepu
- Kenyah Lepo' Timai
- Kenyah Long Ulai
- Kenyah Long Sebatu
- Kenyah Long Belukun
- Kenyah Long Tikan
- Kenyah Uma' Bangan
- Kenyah Uma' Baka
- Kenyah Uma' Kelep
- Kenyah Uma' Lasan
- Kenyah Uma' Lung
- Kenyah Uma' Pawa'
- Kenyah Uma' Sambop
- Kenyah Uma' Tukung
- Kenyah Seping
- Kenyah Lirung (Long Nuah)

== Origins ==
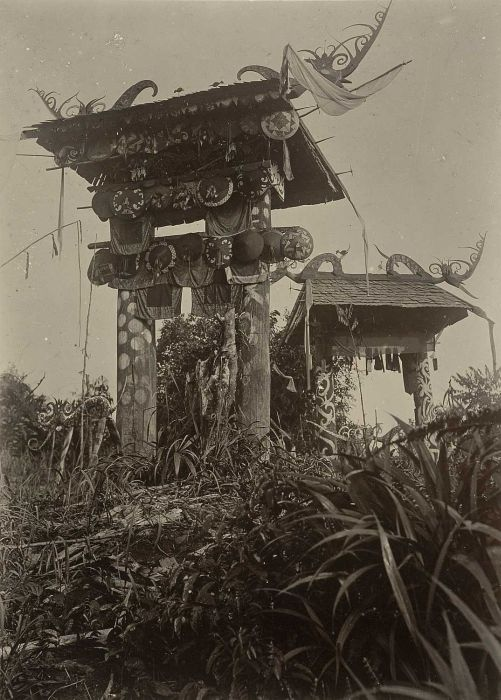
Kenyah architecture, circa 1898-1900.

The Usun Apau (aka Usun Apo) plateau (in the Plieran River valley) or Apo Kayan Highlands (a remote forested plateau in Malaysian and Indonesian border) in the present-day Indonesian province of North Kalimantan and Malaysia's Sarawak is believed by the Kenyah people to be their place of origin; which was the largest concentration site of Kenyah populations between the late 19th century to the early 1980s.

== Languages ==
The Kenyah languages are a small family of Austronesian languages. Their language is called Kenyah.

== Folk songs ==
- Leleng-Leleng
- Leleng
- Ake' Mimbin Iko' Tuyang
- Pabat Pibui
- Daleh Lenca dalem bada
- Ayen Palo boka tai mutu leto

== Notable people ==
- Francisca Luhong James - Miss Universe Malaysia 2020 and a part-time model. She is of mixed Kayan, Kenyah and Iban lineage.
- Yurnalis Ngayoh, Governor east Kalimantan
- Temenggong Oyong Lawai Jau former the first Orang Ulu senator in Malaysia Cabinet in 1963.
- Jacob Dungau Sagan, former Member of the Malaysian Parliament, former Deputy Minister of International Trade and Industry of Malaysia, and member and Senior Vice-President of the Sarawak Progressive Democratic Party (SPDP)
- Joseph Kalang Tie, professional footballer and Malaysia National Team representative. He hails from Long Ikang, Baram and is of Kenyah-Malaysian Chinese parentage.
- Larissa Ping Liew, Miss World Malaysia 2018. She is of Malaysian Chinese-Kenyah parentage.
- Lerby Eliandry
- Tommy Mawat Bada - Malaysian footballer player

== See also ==
- View of the tiger
