= Baram River =

River in Sarawak, Malaysia

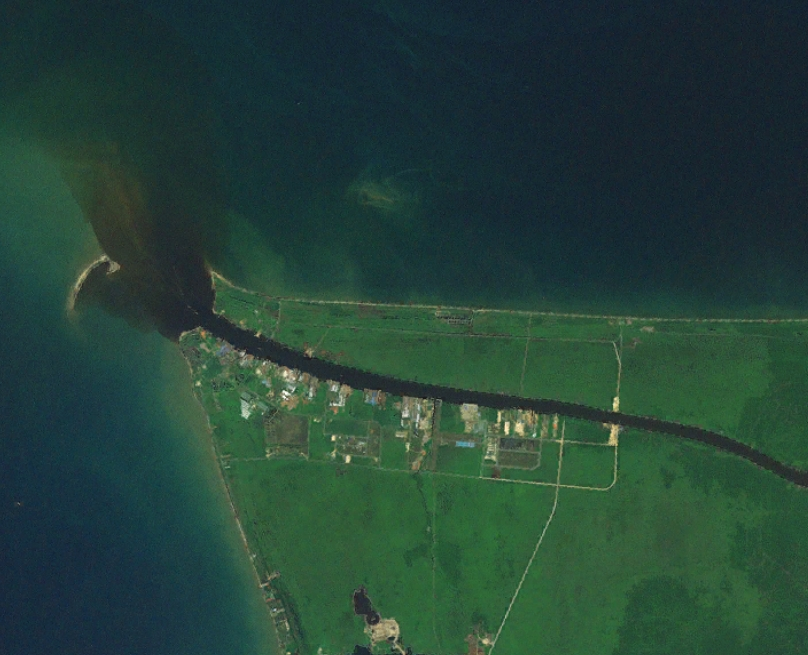
- Mouth of Baram river with black water plume
- Native name: Sungai Baram (Malay)

Location
- Country: Malaysia

Physical characteristics
- Source: Kelabit Highlands
  - location: Confluence of Kelapang and Dappur Rivers
  - coordinates: 3°25′25.41″N 115°27′11.7252″E
  - elevation: 710 m (2,330 ft)
- 2nd source: Kelapang River
  - coordinates: 3°27′52.254″N 115°31′35.3928″E
  - elevation: 1,490 m (4,890 ft)
- 3rd source: Dappur River
  - coordinates: 3°46′11.5284″N 115°33′24.4656″E
  - elevation: 1,085 m (3,560 ft)
- Mouth: South China Sea
  - location: at Miri into South China Sea
  - coordinates: 4°35′11.4288″N 113°58′30.5796″E
  - elevation: 0 m (0 ft)
- Length: Baram–Kelapang 635 km (395 mi)
- Basin size: 22,325 km^{2} (8,620 sq mi)
- Discharge
  - location: Baram Delta
  - average: 58.21 km^{3}/a (1,845 m^{3}/s)

Basin features
- Progression: South China Sea
- River system: Baram River
- Tributaries
  - left: Kelapang, Tutoh, Temala, Pelutan, Patah, Akah, Buang, Selaan, Serungo
  - right: Dappur, Arang, Tinjar, Julan, Silat, Moh

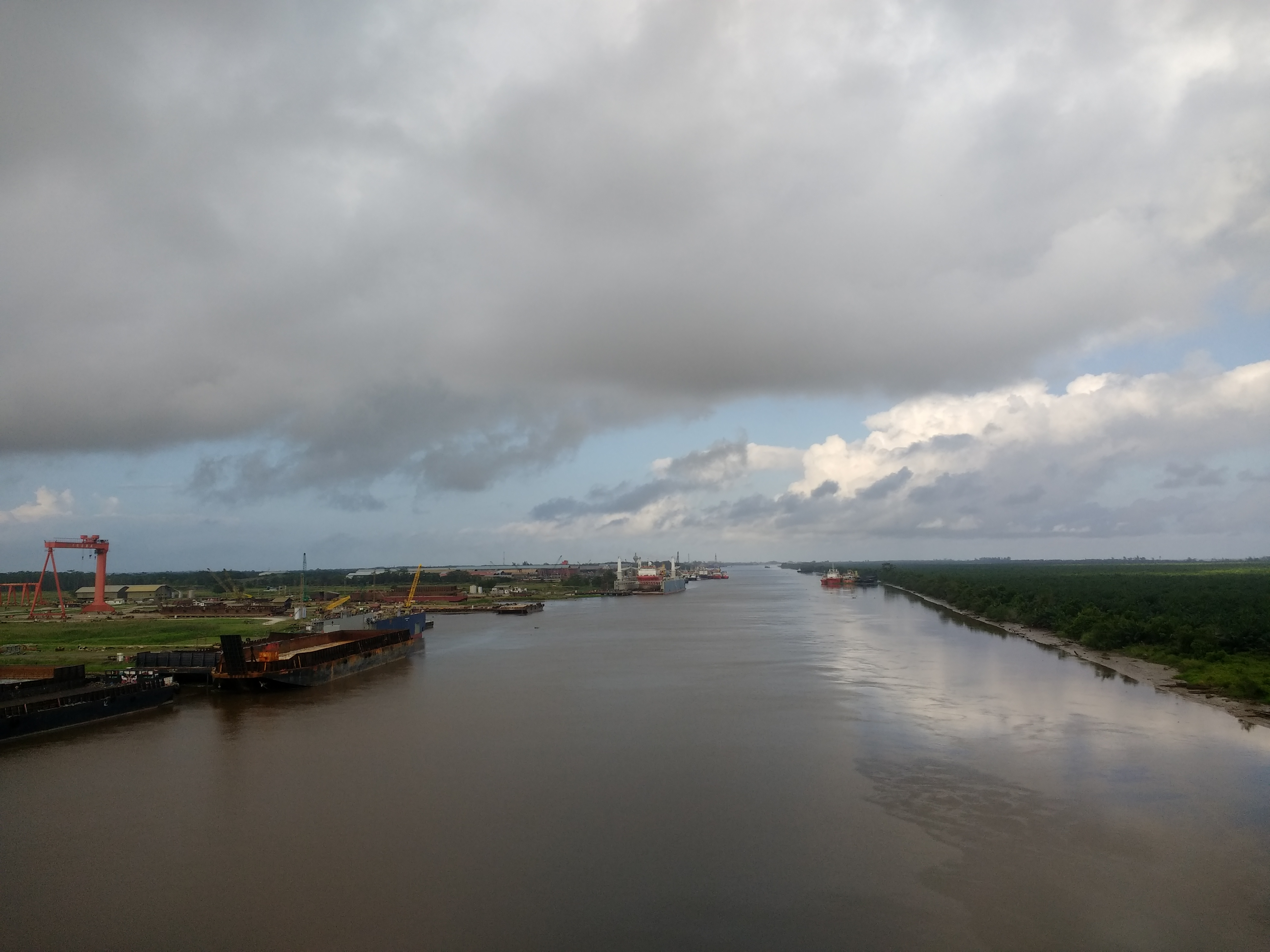
The Baram River seen from the ASEAN Bridge

The Baram River (Malay: Sungai Baram) is a river in Sarawak on the island of Borneo. The river originates in the Kelabit Highlands, a watershed demarcated by the Iran Mountains of East Kalimantan, which form a natural border with Sarawak.

== Geography ==
The Baram river basin, an area of some 22,325 km^{2} (8,620 sq mi), has been part of Sarawak since it was ceded to the White Rajah of Sarawak by the then sultan of Brunei in 1882, for a perpetual annual payment of 6,000 dollars.

The river flows westwards through tropical rainfores (Köppen climate classification Af type) to the South China Sea. The Baram catchment receives around 3,800 mm of rainfall per year. The Baram River terminates in a delta, which is subdivided into two units: East Barma Delta of Middle-Late Miocene age and West Baram Delta of Late Miocene-Quaternary age. The western unit is composed of mudstones enriched in organic components (total organic carbon content is more than 1.0 wt.%) which constitute substantial oil and gas reserves.

The river is crossed not far from its mouth by the Miri-Baram Highway, Federal Route 22, on the Batang Baram Bridge opened in 2003. Some 100 km upstream lies the town of Marudi.

== Etymology ==
Batang (meaning "trunk" in Malay) is the name used for the main river in the river system such as "Batang Baram" (Baram river). For upriver areas, such as the areas surrounding the headwaters, the place is named as "Ulu" (which means "upriver"). For example, "Ulu Baram" is the upriver part of the Baram river. "Long" meaning "confluence" is used by the Orang Ulu (upriver people). It is used to name the places located at the confluence between the smaller tributaries and the major river, same way as the Malay usage of the name "Kuala" (meaning river delta). The name "Pa'" (meaning "village") is exclusively used in the Kelabit Highlands such as "Pa Umor" village in Bario.

== History ==
The Baram river flood happened in May 1962.
