= Interhill =

Interhill Logging Sdn. Bhd. is an enterprise of the wood economy in Miri in Sarawak, Malaysia. It endangers the rainforest being the livelihood of the Penan people. However, Interhill claims to be involved in sustainable forestry development. Lumberers of Interhill have been accused by Bruno Manser Fonds to have raped young Penan women. French hotel group Accor cooperates or used to cooperate with Interhill. Following pressure, Accor has expected social standards of Interhill.
