= Tong Tana =

Tong Tana: A Journey to the Heart of Borneo is a 1989 Swedish documentary film about the Penan people of Sarawak, Borneo, a federal state of Malaysia, and their struggle to protect their tropical rainforest. Central to the film is the story of Swiss environmental activist, Bruno Manser, who was targeted by the Malaysian government for protesting the lumber industry's logging operations. Ten years later, the TV crew returned to the area and filmed Tong Tana: The Lost Paradise, which documented their struggle to protect what was left after their homeland was logged.

Filmmakers Jan Roed, Fredrik von Krusenstjerna, Bjorn Cederberg and Kristian Petri worked on the first documentary. A 1991 review in the Los Angeles Times called the first film "as beautiful as it is heartbreaking".

In May 2000, shortly after the second film was completed, Manser disappeared without a trace and was presumed dead.

== See also ==
- Indigenous rainforest blockades in Sarawak
