= Indigenous rainforest blockades in Sarawak =

Environmental protests in Malaysia

Indigenous rainforest blockades in Sarawak began during the late 1980s and 1990s. In response to deforestation and land conversion of Sarawak's forest landscapes, Indigenous people of several groups along with international activists organised blockades to resist logging activities and dam construction. Penan, Kayan and Kelabit people are among the groups who participated. Some blockades were dismantled by police and some participants were arrested. Indigenous people have continued to hold blockades into the 21st century.

== Background ==
Borneo's forests contain a variety of ecosystems, including rainforests, peatlands, mangroves, heath forests, and palm trees. The Sarawak region had been ruled by the White Rajahs of the Brooks for the previous 100 years. These forests supply ecosystem services to Indigenous communities in Southeast Asia. Due to anthropogenic land-use changes, particularly logging and dam building, the Borneo rainforests have been deforested and fragmented at a rapid rate. Indigenous people, non-human species and entire ecological landscapes have been impacted by these land-use changes.

In the 1970s timber companies began moving into Sarawak, a state in the Malaysian part of the island of Borneo. Forested lands across Borneo have been converted from natural landscapes to anthropogenically modified landscapes. Previously natural environments were harvested for wood, destroyed by fire and converted to plantations. The conversion of forested lands to palm oil plantations was the most common, but rubber and acacia plantations were also established. By 2014, 11% of Sarawak's primary rainforests ecosystem remained, with nearly 90% converted to other uses. There has been a long-term resistance to deforestation by local Indigenous peoples.

== List of resistance activities and blockades ==
- 1987 - Communities in Sarawak, such as Penan and Kayan, resisted logging by putting up a blockade in the Baram region - 42 activists were arrested.
- 1990 - The Voices for the Borneo Rainforest World Tour, brought Indigenous perspectives to forums across the globe, with the goal of raising awareness about the logging in Sarawak, and calling for an end to deforestation in primary rainforests in Sarawak. Participants included Mutang Urud from the Kelabit people; Mutang Tu'o and Unga Paran from the Panan people; Bruno Manser from Switzerland, as translator; and Thom Henley, tour director from Canada.
- March 1993 to November 1993 - Ba Mubui area of the Baram constituency in Sarawak - Resulted in the dismantling of the blockade by police as well as implementation of a new law allowing for the arrest and conviction of anyone near any future blockades.
- 1998 - Blockade of oil palm plantations located on Iban territory. One protester is killed and another injured by armed forces.
- September to October 2012 - Penan Indigenous people blockaded the construction site of the new Murum dam after hearing of the conditions for their resettlement.
- September 19, 2013 - The Penan Indigenous people affected by the Murum dam in Sarawak reinstated their blockade of the dam site claiming that the Malaysian government had failed to adequately compensate them.
- 2016 - Blockades in Sarawak continue even following the government of Sarawak's decision to withdraw its claim to the land designated for the Baram Dam.
- 2019 - Conflicts around two logging projects by the Samling Group caused Penan, Kenyah and Jamok communities to raise dozens of formal complaints.

== Local reactions to deforestation ==
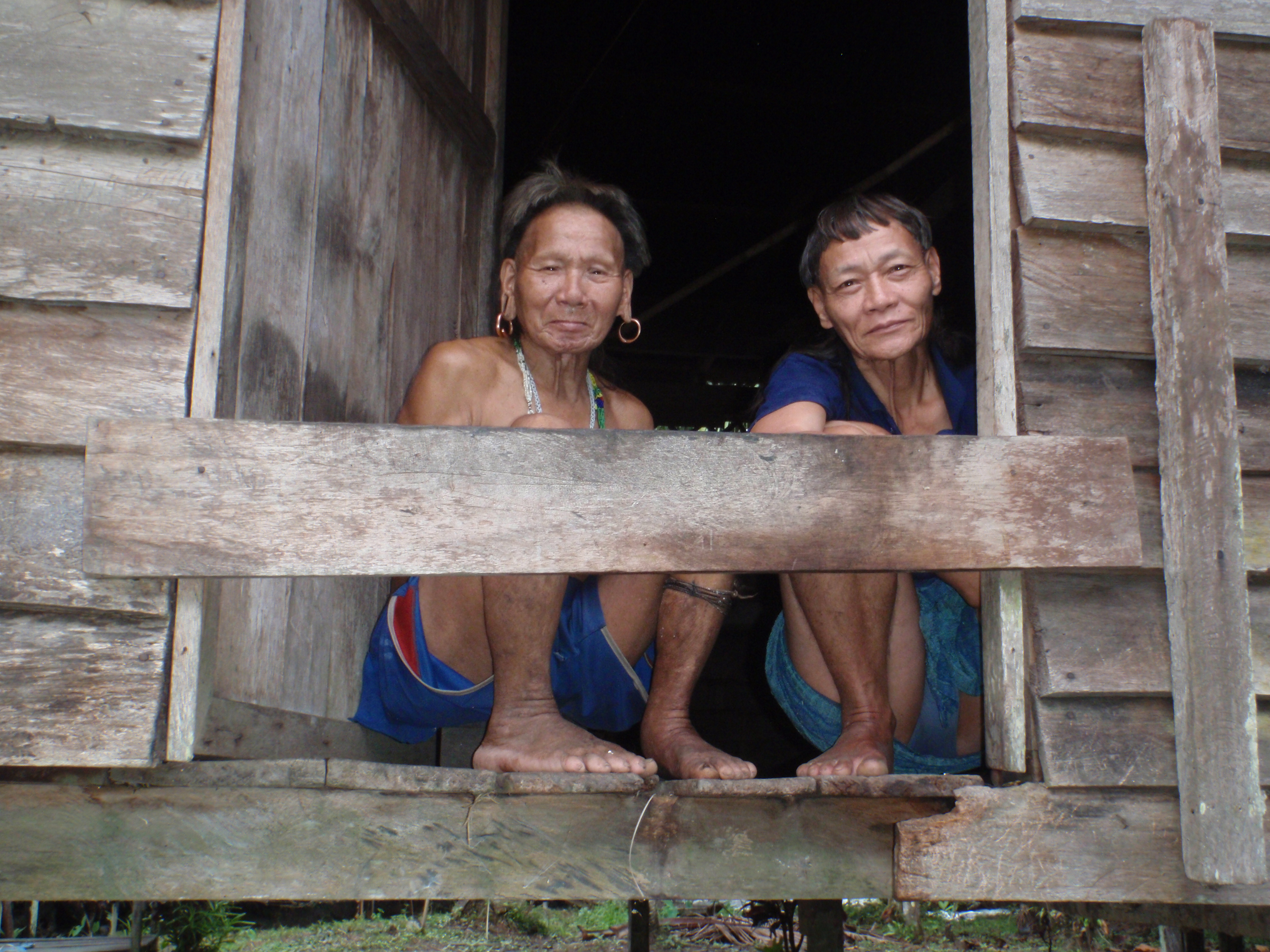
Penan Elders in traditional house

=== The Penan people ===
The Penan people are an Indigenous group native to the Borneo lowland rain forests in Sarawak and have been facing direct consequences of the logging activities for decades. This group consists of the East Penan living northeast of the Baram River and the West Penan living to the southwest. These two groups both oppose the logging and blame the government and logging companies for the destruction of their lands. The East Penan organized the majority of the blockades in the late 20th century.

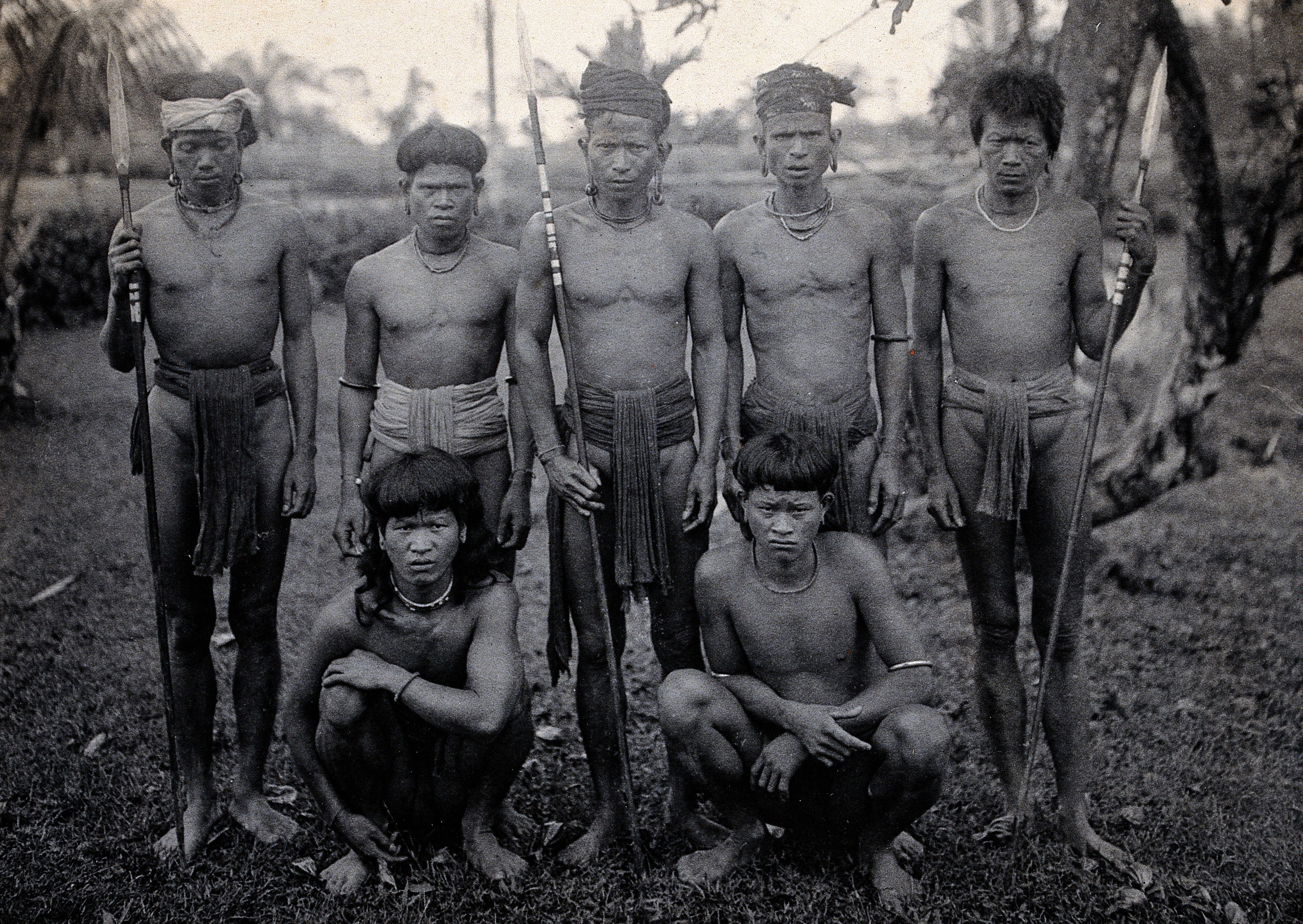
A group of Kelabit men

=== Kelabit ===
The Kelabit are an Indigenous group from the interior of Borneo inhabiting the Kelabit Highlands. The Kelabits in Long Napir, Long Seridan and Long Lelang have all been adversely affected by logging operations since the early 1970s. Kelabit territory includes Pulong Tau National Park. Currently, their territory is at risk as logging moves inland and roads are constructed toward their settlements. The Bario Highland Kelabit territories have not yet been affected by logging, as they have been protected by the historical significance of the area. Allied forces during WWII and they live in remote highlands with area ecological evidence showing inhabitation for at least 2000 years. Similar to the Penan people, the Kelabit can also be divided into two communities: the urban Kelabit and the rural Kelabit.

==== Urban Kelabit ====
Many urban Kelabit have had a negative perception of the blockades, with the concern that they will anger the government who may revoke their status as a nature preserve and decide to use the area for logging rather than tourism. The urban population also benefits from the logging activity approaching their settlements as this means proper roads will be constructed to their villages allowing for more cost-effective delivery and exportation of goods.

Urban Kelabit have also expressed their approval of an increase in accessibility and subsequent modern benefits, citing the need for more schools, hospitals and modern conveniences like electricity, television and fast food.

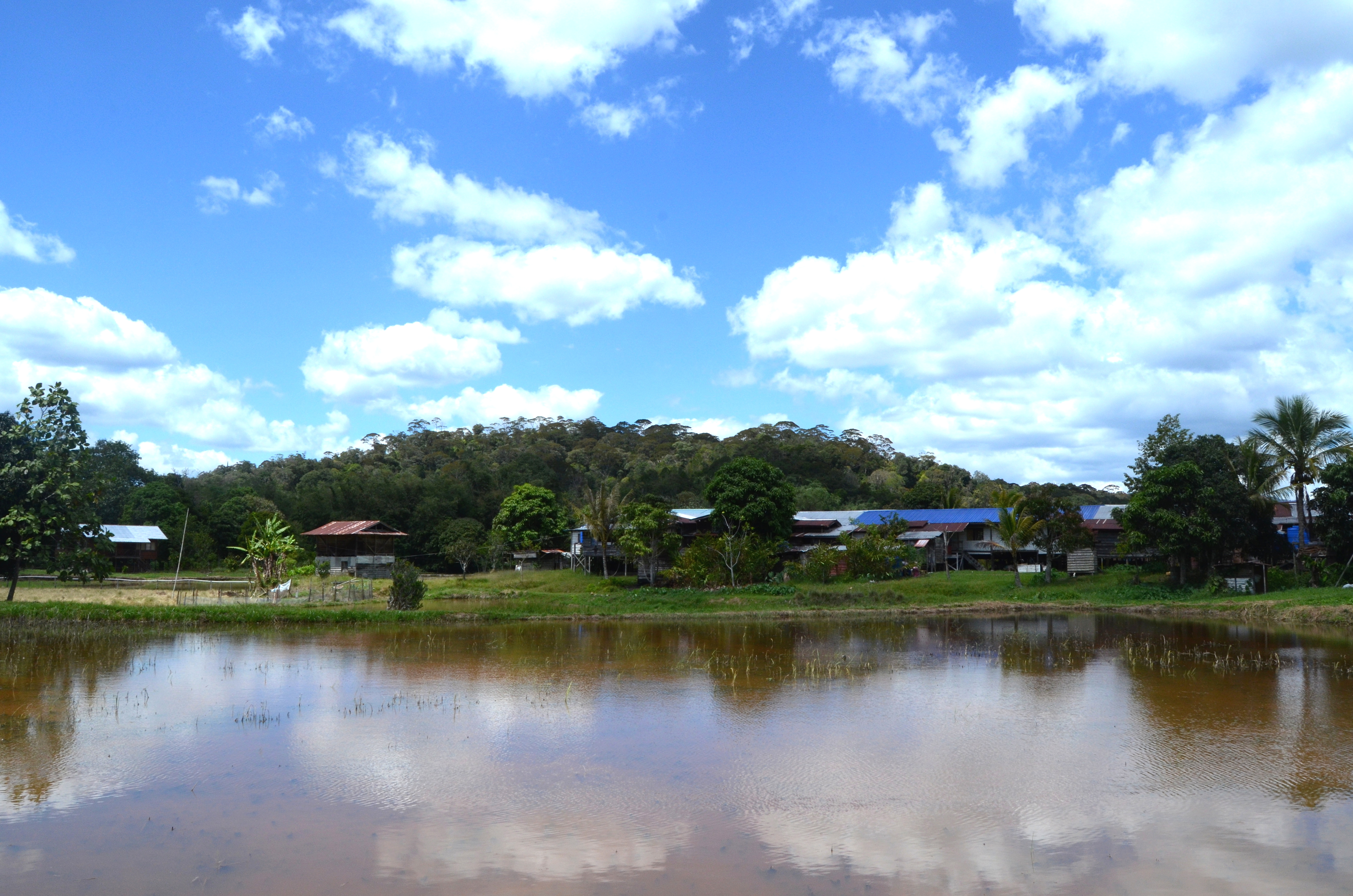
Village in the Kelabit Highlands

==== Rural Kelabit ====
Many rural Kelabit have supported the logging blockades, seeing them as part of a larger struggle to preserve their culture and way of life. There exist larger concerns about the logging in the rural communities than in the urban ones, as the logging threatens the resources required for rural Kelabit to continue their traditional livelihoods.

=== Malaysian Government ===
The Malaysian government has blamed western environmentalists for the blockades and equated the actions of western media outlets and important figures such as Al Gore to neocolonialism. They have argued that western governments use critique of their resource extraction practices as a means of gaining control of the internal affairs of countries in the global south.

== Local impacts ==
=== Subsistence ===
==== Farming ====
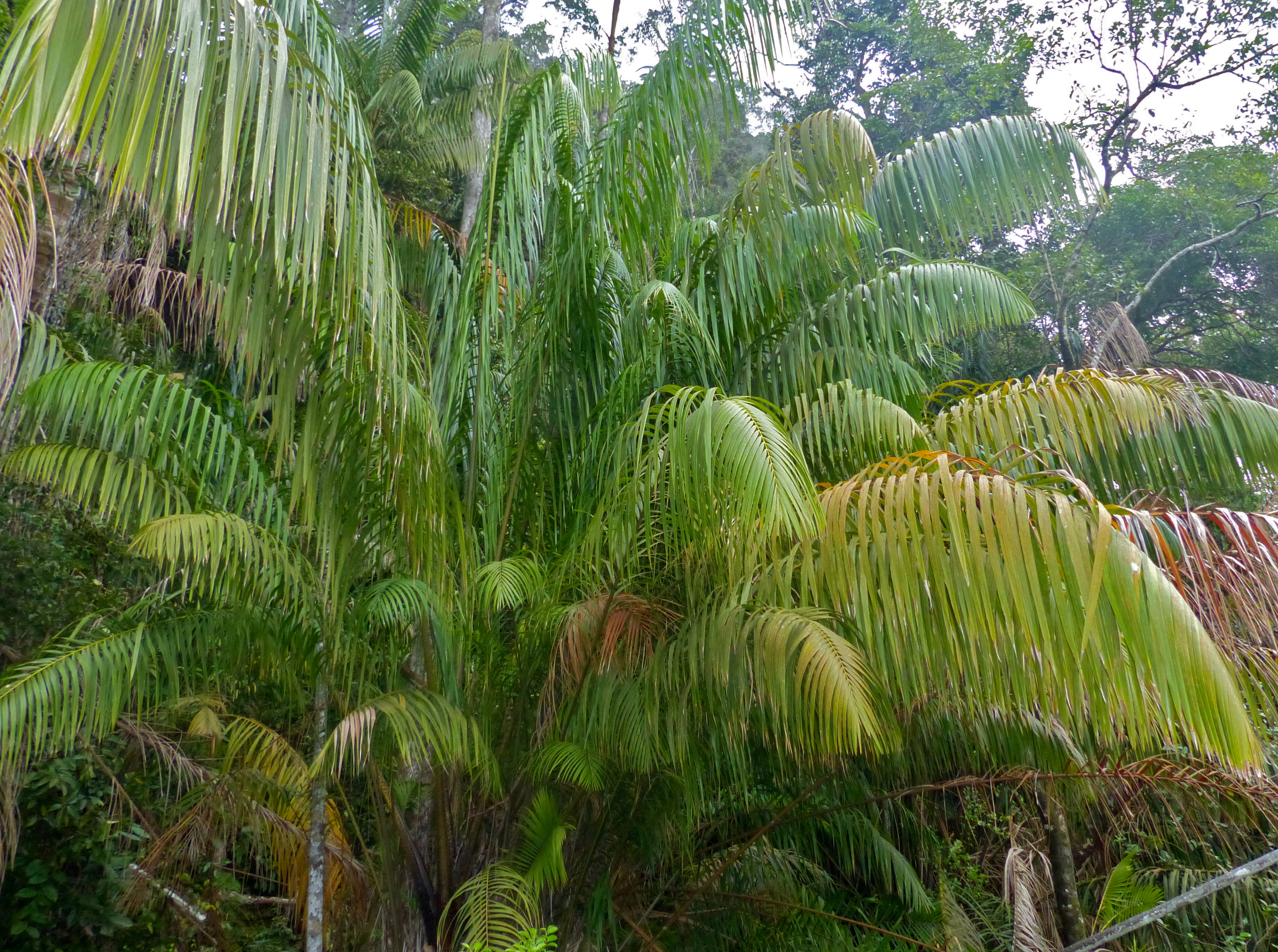
Wild Hill Sago Palm in Sarawak

A major part of the local diet is the sago palm which grows on steep slopes, where logging roads are often built. This construction causes landslides and the destruction of the crops. The logging activity also causes influxes of sediment into the rivers, making cleaning the sago difficult.

==== River Resources ====
Increased sedimentation resulting from deforestation, construction operations and traffic has made finding clean drinking water difficult. It has also impacted fish stocks as water pollution disrupts their habitat, impacts their breeding cycles, and in some cases kills them outright due to poor oxygenation of the water.

==== Hunting ====
Many of the local Penan have complained that the trees from which they harvest hunting poison have been cut down without being harvested for timber products. The logging activities have also driven many of the wildlife they hunt from the area and destroyed the habitats where they would settle. There have also been complaints of loggers using shotguns to hunt, further pressuring the local wildlife.

=== Economical ===
Another local crop that is being destroyed is the rattan, which is a principal source of fiat currency for many local Indigenous people.

=== Cultural ===
The Penan people also bury their dead on the mountain slopes which are impacted by road construction, leading to the destruction of cultural graves and sacred places.

== See also ==
- Deforestation in Borneo
- Deforestation in Malaysia
- Clare Rewcastle Brown
- Radio Free Sarawak
- Bruno Manser
- Long Napir
- Adbul Taib Mahmud
- Tong Tana
