= Sochaczewski =

Sochaczewski is a surname. Notable people with the surname include:

- Aleksander Sochaczewski (1843–1923), Polish painter.
- Deborah Sochaczewski Evelyn (born 1966), Brazilian actress.
- Paul Spencer Sochaczewski (born 1947), American writer, conservationist and communications advisor.
- Renata Sochaczewski (Sorrah) (born 1947), Brazilian actress.
