= Stranger in the Forest =

1988 book

- Author: Eric Hansen
- Genre: Travel book
- Publication date: 1988

Stranger in the Forest: On Foot Across Borneo (1988) is a travel book by American writer Eric Hansen, about a seven-month, 4000 km long journey (of which 2300 km on foot) through the heartland of Borneo in 1982. Hansen became one of the few westerners to walk across the island. He did so largely with the aid of local Penan, who took him away from the rivers, the most used transportation routes in Borneo, to walk through the jungle. The journey started in Marudi in Sarawak, Malaysia, at the northwest coast of the island. When, after an illegal border-crossing, he eventually emerged near the east coast in Kalimantan, Indonesia, the confrontation with western civilisation gave him such a culture shock that he turned around for another crossing of the island.

== Summary ==
=== Preparation ===
Hansen had spent many years preparing for the journey, through research at the University of California, which also had a complete collection of the Sarawak Museum Journals from 1912 onwards. His aim was to cross the island, following old trade routes, collecting jungle products and medicinal plants of value, and exchanging these and western goods for what he needed. This was based on what he had learned during a visit six years earlier. But when he arrived it turned out he was completely unprepared and his source had not been to the highlands. The reason there were no passport checks there was that it was almost impossible to move through that uninhabited, wild, jungle-clad country. He had also learned Malay, which helped him a lot. There were many languages spoken in Borneo, but it turned out that a version of Malay called 'bahasa pasar' (a lingua franca) was spoken throughout the interior. He flew across Borneo several times to familiarise himself with the landscape. He had also taken along seemingly very detailed British military survey maps. But these turned out to be far too outdated and inaccurate. The few Malay, Indonesian, English and Dutch surveyors who had managed to reach the centre of the island had never agreed on their findings. According to Hansen:

Dr A. W. Nieuwenhuis, two associates and 110 porters and bodyguards had preceded me to succeed in crossing the island, but that had been in 1897, and it had taken them a year. Certainly some local people and perhaps even some westerners have crossed the island. There are many stories, but the point of my trip was not to be the first, or the fastest, or the straightest. The challenge was to do it alone, to make myself completely vulnerable, and to be changed by the environment.

However, he could only carry enough food for 3 or 4 weeks, and he figured he needed 3 months for the crossing. So he had to take along tradable items to exchange for food and whatever else he would need on the way.

=== First crossing ===
For the first eight weeks Hansen made several attempts, going up one river after another, which drained his budget and for which he took along all the wrong trade-items, such as 10 kg of salt, which he ended up giving to a hotel owner, who sympathised with him because he had already seen many westerners try to go so far upriver and failed. In the end, it turned out the best trade item was shotgun shells, of which he took along 250 rounds. These, he gave to his Penan guides. These Penan still used blowpipes, but also had self-made guns, made out of reinforced water pipe, umbrella springs, bicycle inner tubes, metal from flattened oil drums, nails, nuts and bolts and hand-carved hardwood stocks and grips. He gave one shell per day of traveling, which were used instantly and also provided him with the food he couldn't carry. Other good trade items were tobacco and, strangely, beads, the sort of thing one would expect ignorant missionaries to take along. It turned out beads have long been a form of currency in Borneo.

When he finally entered the rainforest proper, cool and dark, with his two guides, he would not see the sun for 4 weeks. The only food they took along was rice and tea leaves. His diet consisted of, among other things, bee larvae, rice soup, roasted rattan shoots, boa constrictors, lizards, monkeys, bats and the large animals - pigs and deer. He never got sick. However, some small cuts developed into festering wounds in ten days time and later in the journey he got bitten by a dog and that wound would also cripple him. "Falling branches and trees and a fuzzy red caterpillar are the most dangerous things in the jungle."

He also had to adapt to a completely different culture. For example, the Penan could understand theft, but rape, mugging, suicide and murder were completely foreign to their way of living. When he asked what would be considered a serious crime in the Penan community, he was told that would be see-hun, meaning being stingy or not to share. He was met with disbelief when he told that in the US there are no laws against stinginess and that hoarding for oneself is even esteemed and rewarded. Measurements were also quite different. For example, he was regularly frustrated by not getting a clear answer to how far a certain destination was. He thought about miles and hours, but they thought in terms of hunting, mood and need. 'Not too far away' could mean a five-day walk through difficult terrain to a friendly village where they could buy tobacco, while 'a long journey' could turn out to be a four-hour walk through in the hated sunlight through flat farmland. So when he surprised his guides by asking where they wanted to go, they decided to go west, to an area where they had never been before, despite the final destination being eastward.

When he finally arrived in Long Bia, near the east coast, 137 days after entering the rainforest, he was greeted in a very unfriendly manner by a Mission Aviation Fellowship (MAF) pilot named Ian, and when he checked into a hotel and looked into the mirror he noticed he had "a penetrating half-mad look to [his] eyes, a look of such unblinking intensity that immediately [he] realised why Ian hadn't been eager to invite [him] into his house." When he went further downriver, for what he thought would be the last day, he was shocked to see the river all muddy from logging and the bare shores, motorised longboats and locals in western T-shirts. He also worried about how he would deal with the police, having an expired passport and no visa. But the sores on his feet were erupting again and he wanted to go to a hospital. "I was exhausted, depressed and half-crippled. The jungle had just spat me out like a piece of old chewing gum. And what were my chances of making it through another 800 miles of jungle in my condition? I could be back in San Francisco in a week, and the temptation to go was great. Get on a plane, I tried to convince myself. Don't be a fool!" Yet, just a day from reaching the coast, he decided to turn back.

=== Second crossing ===
After taking 10 days to let his wounds heal in Long Bia, he set off for the return trip. Confident that he had learned enough by the first crossing, he decided to test himself by taking a more difficult and uncertain route, through the central Kenyah highlands. Getting there would have to be done by plane, to avoid the notoriously dangerous rapids on the Kayan River. He earned this trip on the MAF plane by repairing it (taking it completely apart), despite having no knowledge of airplanes.

What he didn't know was that a rumour was going around about an evil spirit wandering around, and he was regularly taken for this spirit, especially when he entered Dayak villages alone at night. Dayaks never travel through the forest at night, and most certainly not alone, and on top of that his looks fit the description rather too well, which led to some harrowing moments when he had to explain his unlikely appearance at spearpoint.

== Reception ==
Stranger in the Forest was ranked #50 in National Geographic Adventure's "100 Greatest Adventure Books of All Time" (2004). It was also included in National Geographic Traveler's "Ultimate Travel Library" (2008), and the "Penguin Travel Library" series.

The book was reviewed in the New York Times (1988) by Deborah Stead who said "Stranger in the Forest is a gracefully written and passionate book that is full of such unexpected delights. It is an account of a strange world made palpable, written with disarming modesty and rare sensitivity." Jack Mathews writing in the Los Angeles Times (1988) criticized Hansen for going native and hunting local wildlife, "A few more fascinated visitors like him and the jungles of Borneo won't be quite so fascinating, to Hansen or anyone else."
