= Paul Spencer Sochaczewski =

American writer

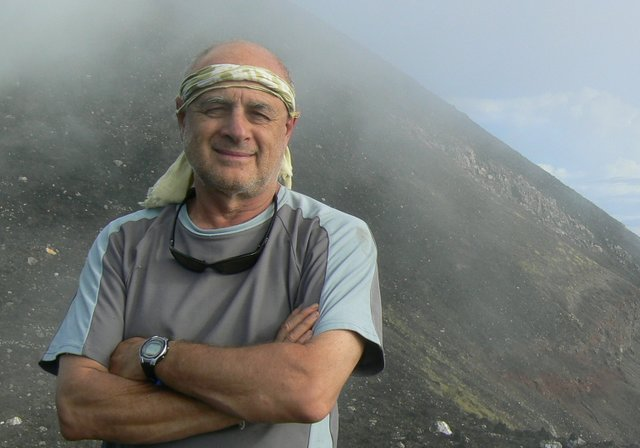
Paul Sochaczewski

Paul Spencer Sochaczewski (born August 1, 1947 in Brooklyn, New York) is an American-French writer, writing coach, conservationist and communications advisor to international non-governmental organizations. He lives in Geneva, Switzerland, and has lived and worked in more than 80 countries, including long stints in Indonesia, Singapore, Malaysia and Thailand.

In 1992, Sochacazewski changed his name from Paul Spencer Wachtel to Paul Spencer Sochaczewski; he wrote about the name change for an article in the International Herald Tribune.

== Themes and style ==
Sochaczewski is particularly interested in Asian stories that defy western Cartesian logic. He writes about the love affair between the Sultan of Yogyakarta (Java) and the mystical Mermaid Queen. His books and articles have exposed the cultural genocide of the Penan people of Sarawak, Malaysia.
