= Eric Hansen (travel writer) =

American travel writer

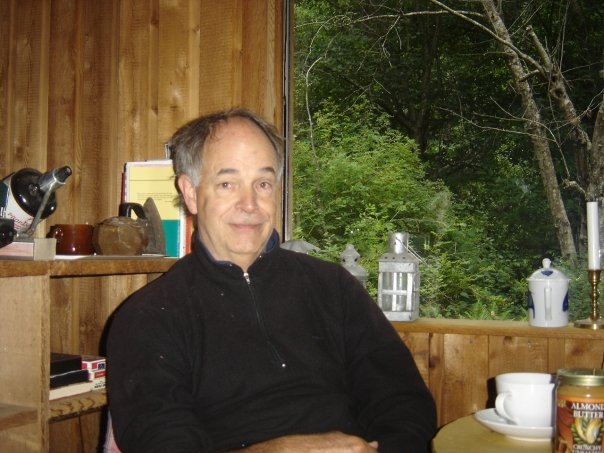
Eric Hansen.

Eric Hansen is an American travel writer, most famous for his book Stranger in the Forest: On Foot Across Borneo, about a 4,000 km trek through the heartland of Borneo. He lives in San Francisco. For 25 years he has traveled throughout Europe, the Middle East, Australia, Nepal, and Southeast Asia. He lived in the deserts, jungles, rain forests and islands of the Middle East and Asia throughout the 1980s and has worked as a goldsmith, a buffalo catcher, a pig farmer, a wild dog hunter and as a barber in Mother Teresa's 'Home for the Destitute Dying' in Calcutta. His articles, photographs, and reviews have appeared in The New York Times, National Geographic, Travel and Leisure, Condé Nast Traveler, and Outside, among other publications worldwide.

Hansen is a graduate of the University of California, where he studied industrial art and environmental design.

Hansen was interviewed by Michael Feldman on the latter's Whad'Ya Know? radio show.

== Awards and honors ==
Stranger in the Forest (1988) was ranked #50 in National Geographic Adventure's "100 Greatest Adventure Books of All Time" (2004). The Bird Man and the Lapdancer (2004) was included in Condé Nast Traveler's "The 86 Greatest Travel Books of All Time" (2007).

== Works ==
- Stranger in the Forest (1988)
- Motoring with Mohammed (1991)
- The Traveler: An American Odyssey in the Himalayas (1993)
- Orchid Fever (2000)
- The Bird Man and the Lap Dancer (2004)

== Sources ==
- Tim Cahill (1988-03-06). "Taken for a Beast in the Jungle". The New York Times.
