= Mutang Urud =

Indigenous environmental activist, Malaysia

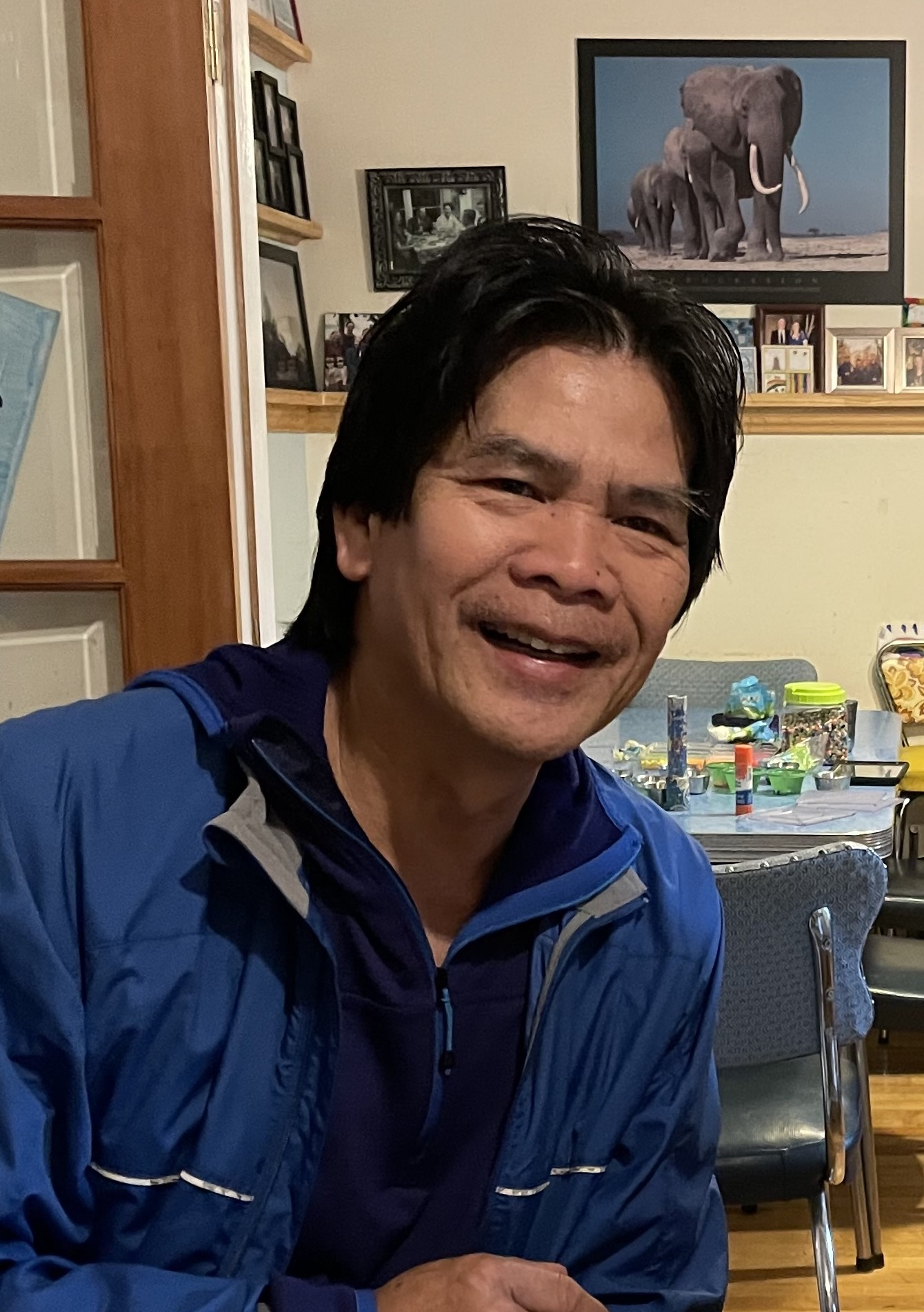
Mutang Urud in Montreal, Canada, 2021

Mutang Urud (20 October 1958) is an Indigenous Kelabit environmental activist, born in Long Napir in Sarawak, a state of Malaysia located on the island of Borneo. Urud is known for helping to organize anti-logging blockades in Sarawak, and as the founder of the Sarawak Indigenous Peoples’ Alliance. He was a member of the Voices for the Borneo Rainforest World Tour in 1990, and spoke to the UN to ask for a halt to logging on Indigenous lands in Borneo. Urud serves as the executive director of the Kalio Conservation and Development Society, and is working to record the oral history of the Kelabit people, create a dictionary of the Kelabit language, and map the Kelabit cultural boundaries.

== Biography ==
=== Early life ===
Urud was born in a small Kelabit village known as Long Napir in the highlands of Sarawak. His father was a farmer, but died when Urud was young, leaving Urud and his eight brothers and sisters to be raised by their mother and older brother. He chose the name Anderson for himself when his village converted to the Borneo Evangelical Church. He briefly lived in the Malaysian capital of Kuala Lumpur, where he obtained a diploma in business at a vocational school. Following his time in school in Kuala Lumpur, he returned to Sarawak where he started a successful landscaping company with one of his brothers.

=== Activism ===
Inspired by the anti-logging activism of his older brother, Mutang began using his earnings from his landscaping company to travel to Indigenous communities around Sarawak, helping them to write petitions to the government protesting logging that violated their land rights. With the Sarawak Indigenous People's Alliance, Mutang helped to organize and support blockades led by the Penan Indigenous people. Mutang Urud participated as a member of the Voices for the Borneo Rainforest World Tour, along with other Indigenous representatives, Mutang Tu'o and Unga Paran from the Panan people; as well as Bruno Manser from Switzerland, as translator; and Thom Henley, tour director from Canada. The tour visited Australia, Japan and countries in Europe and North America. In December 1992, Urud spoke at the United Nations General Assembly in New York, advocating for the land rights of Indigenous peoples.

Urud is currently the executive director of the Kalio Conservation and Development Society, an organization dedicated to documenting Indigenous Malaysian culture and raising awareness of the issues facing Indigenous peoples in Malaysia. Urud appeared in the 2016 film The Borneo Case and his life story was featured in Ashley Duong's 2017 film A Time to Swim.

=== Response from Malaysian authorities ===
On February 5, 1992, Urud was arrested by Malaysian Police for failing to register the Sarawak Indigenous People's Alliance. He was held and interrogated for 28 days, 10 of which were spent in solitary confinement. Once he was released, Urud left the Malaysia, but planned to return the following September to attend his trial. However, when speaking at the Earth Summit in Rio de Janeiro in June, he mentioned that he felt "privileged" to be able to safely return home after speaking out against the logging practices in Malaysia, but was misquoted in a newsletter documenting the conference and was made to look as though he was attacking the Malaysian government, causing a rush of negative press in the Sarawak media. Returning to Vancouver from the Earth Summit, Urud learned there was another warrant for his arrest in Malaysia charging him under the Internal Security Act, which would have allowed for him to be held for up to two years without trial. In response to this, Urud elected to remain in exile in Canada. Urud has recently been able to return to Malaysia to visit, and has conducting mapping and language related research work in his community.

=== Personal life and education ===
After being incarcerated in Malaysia, Urud came to Canada as a refugee, where he lives with his partner, Natasha Blanchet-Cohen, and their two children. Urud received a BA degree in anthropology at Concordia University in Canada.
