= Penan people =

Indigenous people of Borneo

Penan
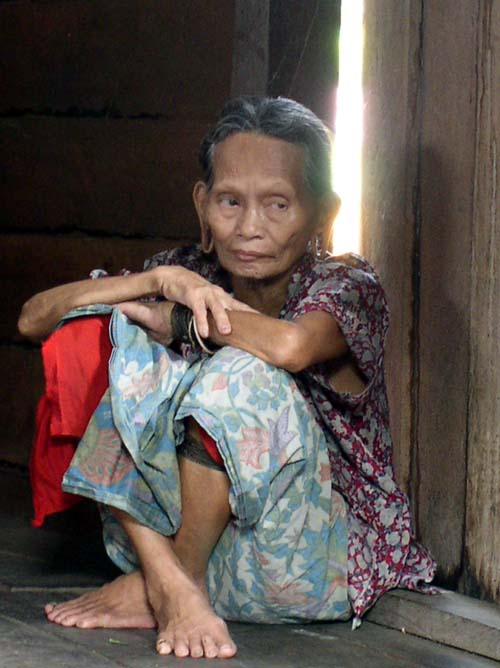
- An old Penan woman from Ulu Baram, Sarawak.

Total population
- 21,367

Regions with significant populations
- Borneo
- Malaysia (Sarawak): 16,281 (2010)
- Brunei: 300

Languages
- Penan, Malay (Sarawakian Malay), English

Religion
- Christianity (predominantly); Bungan (Folk religion), Islam

Related ethnic groups
- Kenyah people

The Penan are a nomadic indigenous people living in Sarawak and Brunei, although there is only one small community in Brunei; among those in Brunei half have been converted to Islam, even if only superficially. Penan are one of the last such peoples remaining as hunters and gatherers. The Penan are noted for their practice of 'molong' which means never taking more than necessary. The originally animistic hunter gatherers Penan were Christianised by missionaries of the Borneo Evangelical Mission and were baptised and settled. They eat plants, which are also used as medicines, and animals and use the hides, skin, fur, and other parts for clothing and shelter.

== Demographics ==
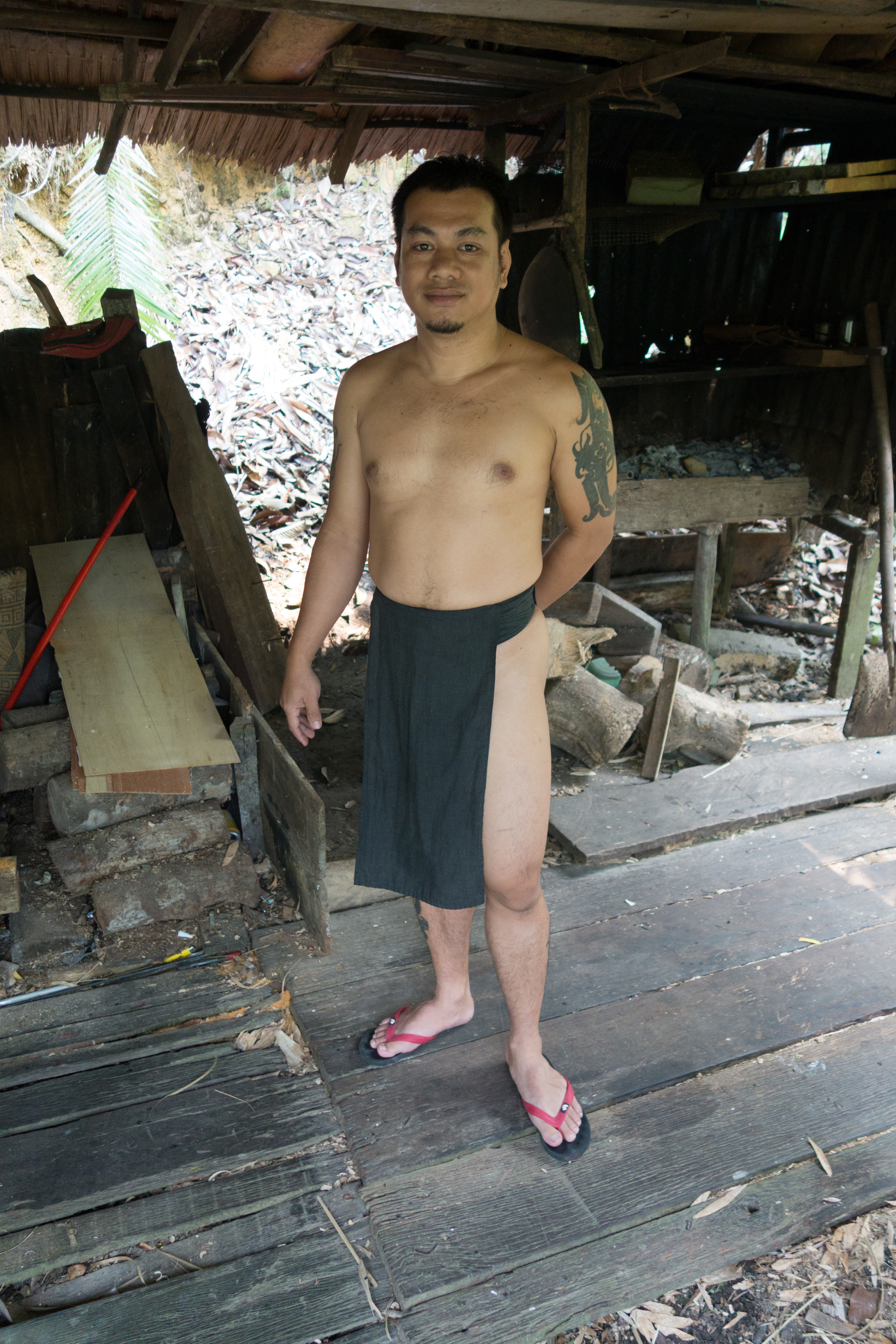
A Penan man from Sarawak, Malaysia.

The Penan number around 16,000; of which only approximately 200 still live a nomadic lifestyle. Penan numbers have increased since they began to settle. The Penan can be described as two loosely related geographical groups known as either Eastern Penan or Western Penan; the Eastern Penan reside around the Miri, Baram, Limbang and Tutoh regions and the Western Penan in and around Belaga district.

They can be considered as a native group or 'tribe' in their own right, with a language distinct from other neighbouring native groups such as the Kenyah, Kayan, Murut or Kelabit. However, in government censuses they are more broadly classified as Orang Ulu which translates as "Upriver People" and which contains distinct neighbouring groups such as those above. Even more broadly they are included in the term Dayak, which includes all of Sarawak's indigenous people.

== Language ==
The Penan language belongs to the Kenyah subgroup within the Malayo-Polynesian branch of the Austronesian language family.

== Lifestyle ==
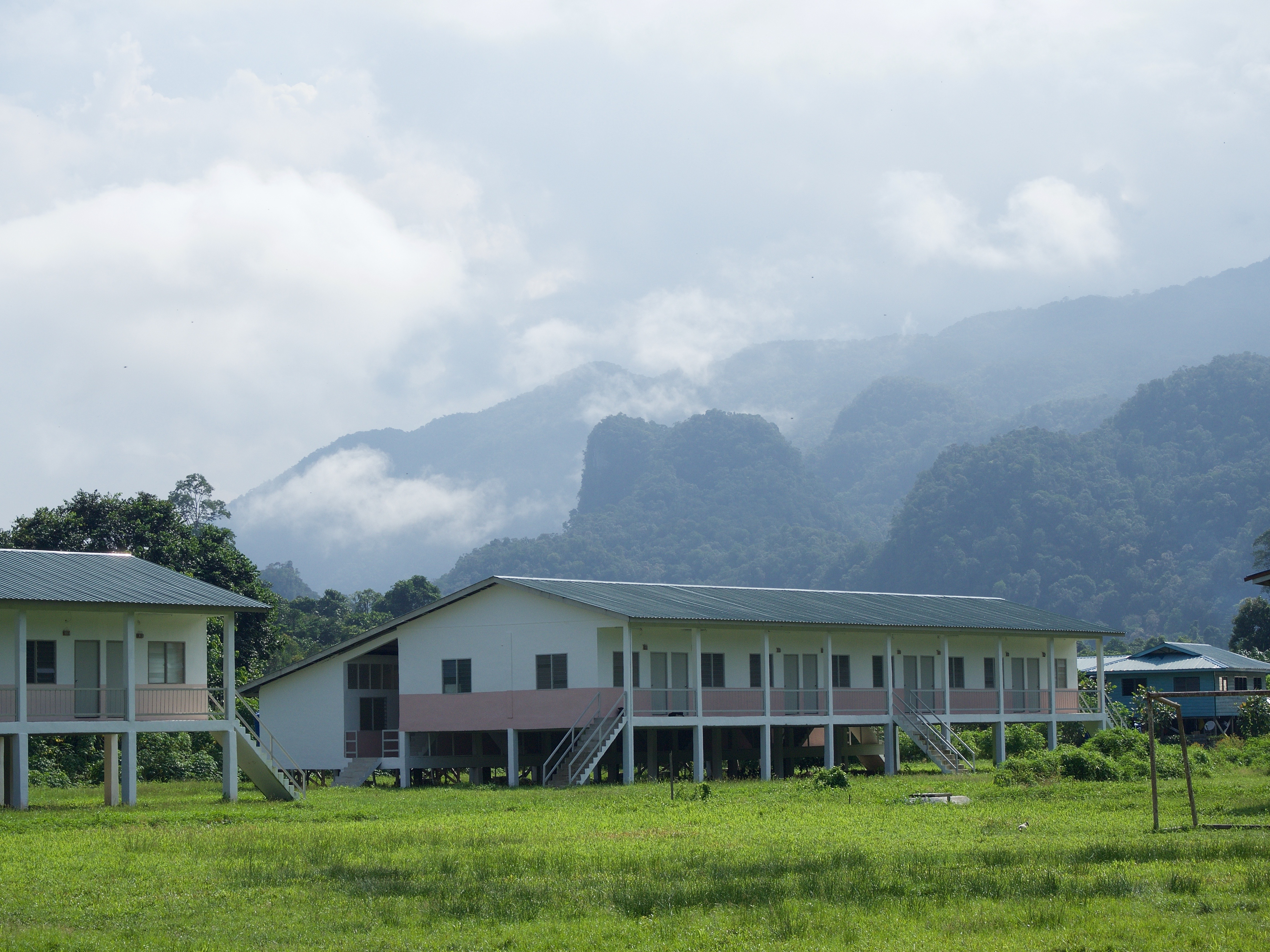
A government sponsored longhouse in a Penan Village on the Melinau River, adjacent to Gunung Mulu National Park, Sarawak.

Penan communities were predominantly nomadic up until the 1950s. The period from 1950 to the present has seen consistent programmes by the state government and foreign Christian missionaries to settle Penan into longhouse-based villages similar to those of Sarawak's other indigenous groups.

Very few Penan live in Brunei any more, and their way of life is changing due to pressures that encourage them to live in permanent settlements and adopt year-around farming.

== Standard of living ==
According to the Sarawak Premier, Tan Sri Abang Johari Tun Openg there were 266 Penans with formal education of which 3 have master's degrees, 142 have bachelor's degrees and 81 have high school diplomas, counted from 1998 to 2002. 2 Penans are finishing their doctoral degrees on 4 July 2023.

== Resistance to deforestation in Sarawak ==
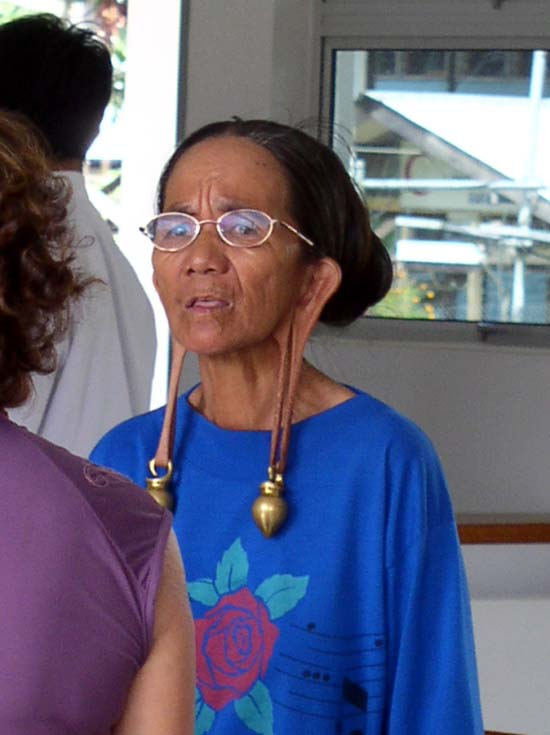
A Penan woman from Baram, Sarawak.

"The army and the police came to our blockade and threatened us and told us to take down our barricade. We said 'we are defending our land. It is very easy for you as soldiers and policemen. You are being paid. You have money in your pockets. You can buy what you need; rice and sugar. You have money in the bank. But for us, this forest is our money, this is our bank. This is the only place where we can find food." (Penan spokesman, 1987)

The Penan came to national and international attention when they resisted logging operations in their home territories of the Baram, Limbang, Tutoh and Lawas regions of Sarawak. The Penan's struggle began in the 1960s when the Indonesian and Malaysian governments opened up large areas of Borneo's interior to commercial logging. In most cases, the largest and most lucrative logging concessions went to members of the island's political and business elites. With an increase in the global demand for timber at the time, these concessionaries began to procure all marketable trees from their holdings. Since both the settled, semi-nomadic and nomadic Penan communities were and are reliant on forest produce, they were hit hard by the large scale logging operations that encroached on their traditionally inhabited territories. The logging caused the pollution of their water catchment areas with sediment displacement, the loss of many sago palms that form the staple carbohydrate of Penan diet, scarcity of wild boar, deer and other game, scarcity of fruit trees and plants used for traditional forest medicine, destruction of their burial sites and loss of rattan and other rare plant and animal species. For the forest people of Borneo, like other native tribes, such plants and animals are also viewed as sacred, as the embodiment of powerful spirits and deities. Thus, the Penan made numerous verbal and written complaints to the logging companies and local government officials. They argued that the logging companies were located on land given to the Penan in an earlier treaty, recognised by the Sarawak state government, and were thus violating their native customary rights. It was also claimed that logging plans were never discussed with the Penan before felling began. However, these complaints fell on deaf ears. Beginning in the late 1980s and continuing today the Penan and other indigenous communities such as the Iban, Kelabit and Kayan (collectively referred to as Dayak) have set up blockades in an attempt to halt logging operations on their land. These succeeded in many areas but the efforts were hard to sustain and ended in large-scale clashes between the indigenous communities and the state-backed logging companies, supported by the police and Malaysian army. In 1987, the state government passed the amendment S90B of the Forest Ordinance, which made the obstruction of traffic along any logging road in Sarawak a major offence. Under this law, The confrontations ended with several deaths, many injuries and large-scale arrests of indigenous people. Many of the detained reported being beaten and humiliated while in custody. An independent Sarawakian organisation IDEAL documented such claims in a 2001 fact-finding mission entitled "Not Development, but Theft".

However, confrontation with state authorities has not been the only source of conflict for the Penan or the Dayaks. In the late 1990s, in neighbouring Kalimantan, the Indonesian government set aside millions of acres of forest for conversion into commercial rubber and palm oil plantations. Much of these areas have been traditionally occupied by indigenous groups. Crucially, to provide labour for such developments, the Indonesian government subsidised the relocation of unemployed labourers from other parts of Indonesia (particularly Java and Madura) to Kalimantan. As part of their contracted obligations, these settlers have participated in the clearing of forests. This has resulted in (increasingly) frequent and violent conflicts between the settlers and the Dayak population. Hundreds of people have been killed in these encounters and thousands more have been forced to live in refugee camps. Because the two warring factions have different racial and religious backgrounds, the international media has often reported this conflict as ethnic animosity. Rather, it is the pursuit of resource wealth by powerful governments and businesses, despite strong resistance by local residents, which has caused the fighting.

In the mid-1980s, when the plight of the Penan had been exposed on the world stage, the Sarawak State Government began making many promises to the Penan in an attempt to quell international protests and embarrassment. Global support for the Penan had included boycotts and blockades of ships carrying rainforest timber in countries such as Australia. Among these were the promise of infrastructure facilities (for those who had been forced to resettle in government encampments due to deforestation) and the Magoh Biosphere Reserve. Magoh Biosphere Reserve is an environmental ‘no intrusion’ zone introduced by Chief Minister Abdul Taib Mahmud in 1990. However, in reality, this reserve has only ‘proposed boundaries’ within which logging companies continue to fell the forest.

The Penan explicitly outlined their wants and requirements to the Sarawak State Government of Abdul Taib Mahmud in the 2002 Long Sayan Declaration. The confrontation between the Penan and Sarawak State Government has continued to the present day. The blockade set up by the Penan community of Long Benali was forcefully dismantled on 4 April 2007 by the Sarawak Forestry Corporation (SFC), with support from a special police force unit and overlooked by Samling Corporation employees.

As of 2021 the Penan continue to fight development aggression in their ancestral domain.

=== Bruno Manser ===
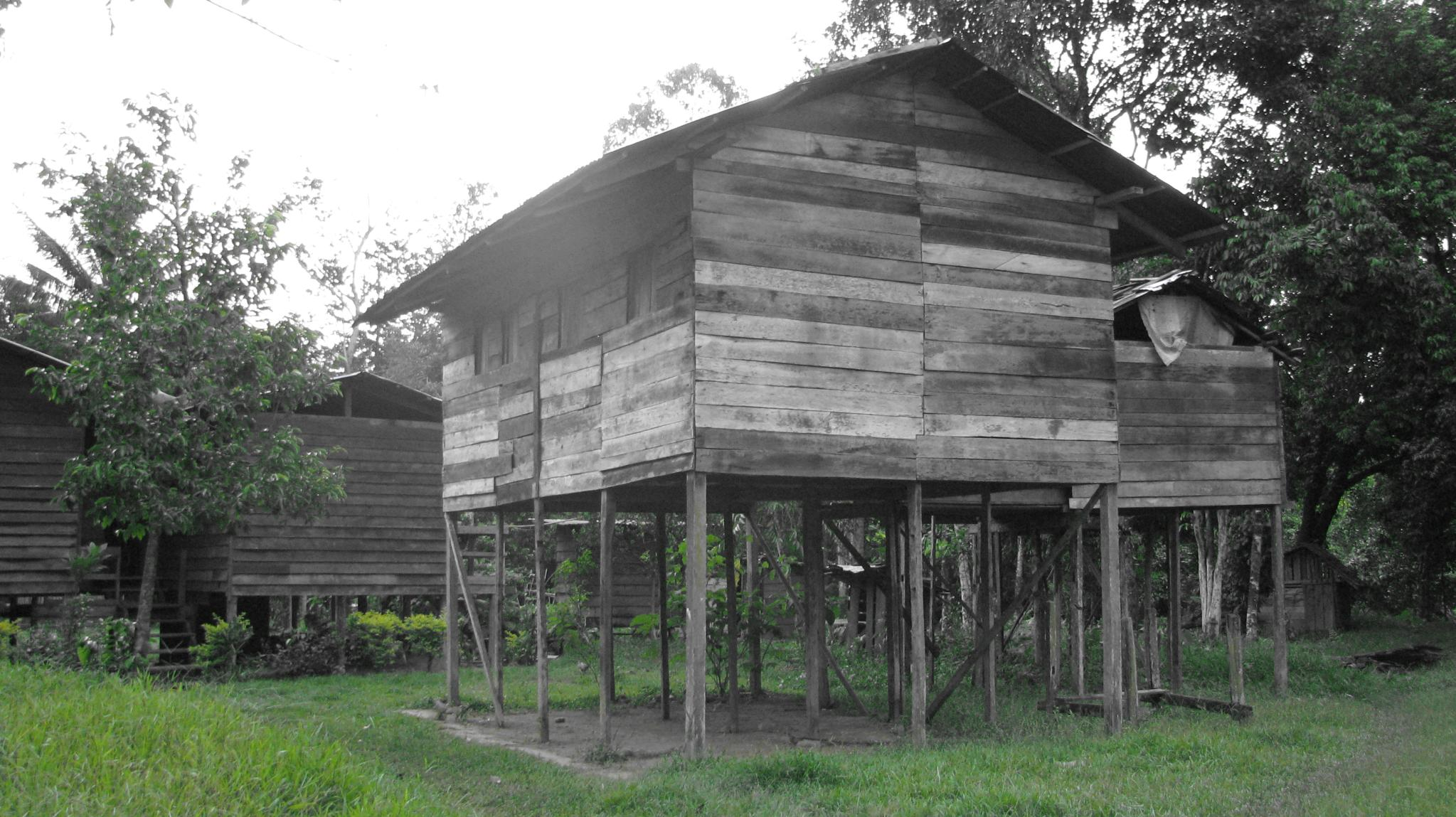
A traditional Penan house.

Bruno Manser was an environmental activist and champion of the Penan's plight during their struggle in the 1990s. Manser lived with the Penan for six years; in that time he learnt their language, survival skills and customs. Named lakei Penan (Penan man) by the Penan, he helped communicate the Penan's cause to the outside world, firstly writing letters to Chief Minister Abdul Taib Mahmud and later leaving Sarawak to educate the outside world (especially timber importing countries in Europe and Japan) about the deforestation and related social problems in Sarawak. He later conducted public awareness stunts such as paragliding onto the lawn of Chief Minister Abdul Taib Mahmud and attempting a hunger strike outside the offices of Japanese shipping companies in Tokyo.

In 1990, in response to Manser's protests, Sarawak's Chief Minister declared Manser an ‘enemy of the State’ and dispatched a Malaysian army unit to find and capture him. In 1990, Manser returned to his home country of Switzerland and founded the Bruno Manser Fonds (BMF), a non-profit organisation dedicated to the plight of the Penan. In 2000, Manser went missing after returning to Sarawak with a Swedish film team and an associate from BMF to reunite with a Penan group. Manser's body and belongings have never been found despite intensive searches. Theories of assassination by the Sarawak government or logging companies have sprung up because of his status as an ‘enemy of the State’. Other rumours include those of suicide after years of unsuccessful campaigning or getting lost in the dense mossy forests around Bukit Batu Lawi in the Kelabit Highlands, close to the border with Kalimantan. However, Manser had lived for several years in the region with the nomadic Penan and was thus highly experienced.

Five years after his disappearance in the rainforest of Borneo, Manser was officially declared as lost by the Basel Civil Court in Switzerland. Personalities from politics, science and culture remembered the life of Manser in a commemoration ceremony held on 8 May 2010.

=== Response by Malaysian authorities ===
In 1987, Mahathir used the Internal Security Act (ISA) to jail critics of the regime and to neutralise Penan campaigners. Over 1,200 people were arrested for challenging logging and 1,500 Malaysian soldiers and police dismantled barricades and beat and arrested people. During a meeting of European and Asian leaders in 1990, Mahathir said, "It is our policy to bring all jungle dwellers together into the mainstream. There is nothing romantic about these helpless, half-starved, and disease-ridden people."

Malaysian authorities also argued that it is unfair to accuse Malaysia of destroying their own rainforests while the western civilisation continued to cut their own forests down. Preservation of rainforests would mean closing down factories and hinder industrialisation which would result in unemployment issues. Instead of focusing on human rights of Penans, the western activists should focus instead on minorities in their own countries such as Red Indians in North America, Aboriginal Australians, Māori people in New Zealand and Turks in Germany. Malaysian Timber Industry Development Board (MTIB) and Sarawak Timber Industry Development Cooperation (STIDC) spent RM 5 to 10 million in producing a research report to counter allegations by foreign activists.

The Economist was banned twice in 1991 for articles that commented critically on the Malaysian government. Its distribution was deliberately delayed three times. Newspaper editors would receive a phone call from Ministry of Information, warning them to "go easy" on particular topic. Few negative reports, such as logging, appeared on domestic newspapers because of the high degree of self-censorship. Mingguan Waktu newspaper was banned in December 1991 because of publishing criticisms of Mahathir administration. Mahathir defended the press censorship. He told ASEAN that foreign journalists "fabricate stories to entertain and make money out of it, without caring about the results of their lies".

=== Logging today ===
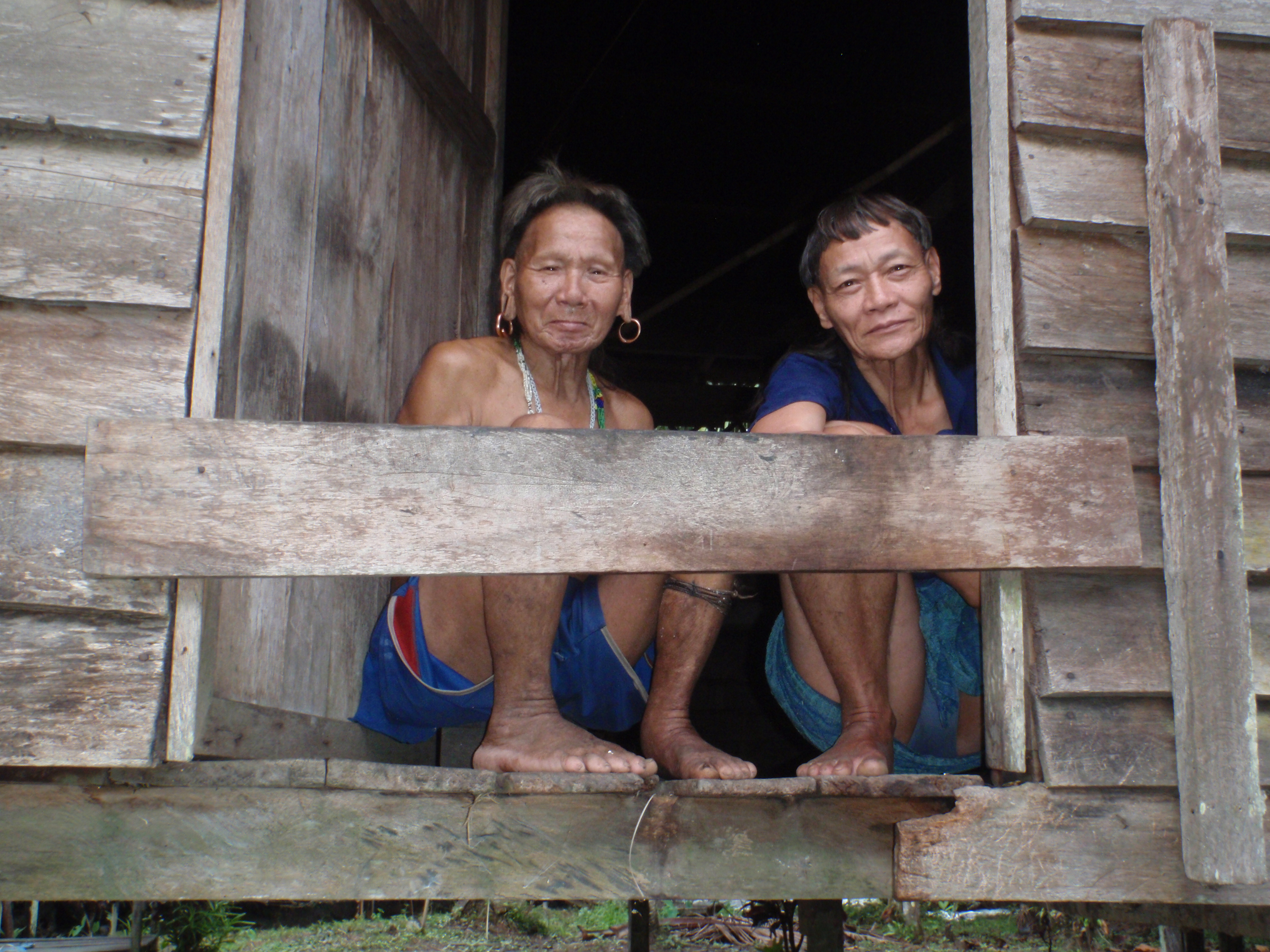
Penan elders.

Logging continues to dominate politics and economics in Sarawak and the government's ambition on timber from proposed Penan ancestral land also continues. Malaysia's rate of deforestation is the highest in the tropical world (142 km^{2}/year) losing 14,860 square kilometres since 1990. The Borneo lowland rain forest, which is the primary habitat of the Penan, and also the most valuable trees have disappeared.

"Despite the (Malaysian) government's pro-environment overtones, the… government tends to side with development more than conservation." — Rhett A. Butler

The government's defence of large-scale logging as a means to economic development has also been challenged as unsustainable, indiscriminate of indigenous rights, environmentally destructive and mired in invested interests, corruption and cronyism. Examples of this have been highlighted by the former Minister for Environment and Tourism Datuk James Wong also being one of the state's largest logging concessionaires. Most recently, the Chief Minister Abdul Taib Mahmud himself is under investigation by Japanese tax authorities for corruption over RM32 million in timber kickbacks allegedly paid to his family company in Hong Kong to lubricate timber shipments. Such allegations are not new, as Malaysia Today claimed in 2005:

There is often a mutually beneficial relationship between logging companies and political elites, involving the acquisition of large private wealth for both parties through bribery, corruption and transfer pricing, at the expense of public benefit through lost revenues and royalty payments and at the expense of social, environmental and indigenous communities' rights ... The awarding of concessions and other licences to log as a result of political patronage, rather than open competitive tender, has been the norm rather than the exception in many countries.

== Threats to the Penan today ==
In August 2009, hundreds of the Penan of Borneo rainforest protested with road blockades against new palm oil and acacia plantations in Sarawak. Their primary concern was the plantation of acacia monocultures which will cause a loss of species biodiversity and soil degeneration.

In August 2010, the Penan spoke out about the Murum hydroelectric dam being built on their land. The construction of the dam is already well underway and will see the flooding of at least six Penan villages once completed. The Penan have argued that they were (once again) not consulted before the project began, nor was a social and environmental impact assessment prepared. Already forests, rivers and natural resources have been destroyed by the build. This time, the Penan have requested that if they must move to make room for the dam then they should have the right to choose where they move to and in what lifestyle capacity. Unfortunately the palm oil company Shin Yang has illegally moved into the area the Penan suggested, without their consent, to create a palm oil plantation. Importantly, the Penan claim that if Shin Yang are allowed to extensively fell the forest, there will not be enough forest left for their community to sustain their livelihood. Furthermore, the Murum dam is the first in a series of large-scale hydroelectric projects being planned by the Sarawak State Government, which will see the displacement of thousands of indigenous people.

In this same month, the Penan tribes in Sarawak's northern region set up blockades to prevent the implementation of a 500 km-long Sarawak-Sabah Gas Pipeline (SSGP). It is said that the SSGP will be built and operational by the end of 2010. It will allow natural gas sourced from Sabah's offshore gas reserves to be delivered to the liquefied natural gas complex in Bintulu. This project particularly affects Penan communities as the SSGP will claim large tracts of their Native Customary Rights land. Furthermore, the laying of this pipeline is only one component of many, set for construction on the Penan's land, with the construction of a proposed onshore Sabah Oil and Gas Terminal (SOGT) and a gas compression station due for completion in 2012.

== Future of the Penan ==
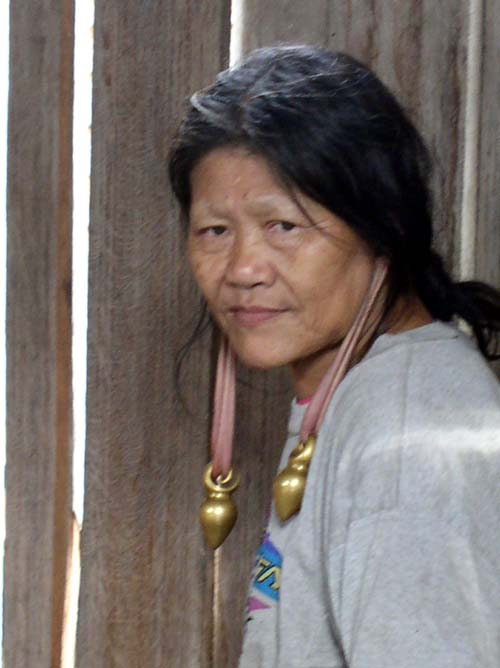
Old woman from Baram in Penan in Sarawak, Malaysia with extremely elongated earlobes carrying brass pendants.

The future of the Penan has been a controversial subject since the confrontation between indigenous rights and state land use began. National and International Non-Governmental Organisations have been pressing for indigenous self-determination and respect for Penan human and land rights in accordance with UN International Labour Organisation Convention N. 169 (1989) that removes “assimilationist” orientated international standards towards indigenous rights, a convention that Malaysia has not adopted. However, many Malaysian politicians have criticised NGOs for meddling in Malaysian domestic affairs and have accused them of attempting to inhibit development projects and keep the Penan 'undeveloped' and unassimilated into mainstream Malaysian society. Most see the Penan's lifestyle as uncivilised and antiquated (compare White man's burden), an example of this is a regularly recited poem by ex Minister for Environment and Tourism Datuk James Wong.

"O Penan - Jungle wanderers of the Tree
What would the future hold for thee?....
Perhaps to us you may appear deprived and poor
But can Civilization offer anything better?....
And yet could Society in good conscience
View your plight with detached indifference
Especially now we are an independent Nation
Yet not lift a helping hand to our fellow brethren?
Instead allow him to subsist in Blowpipes and clothed in Chawats [loincloths]
An anthropological curiosity of Nature and Art?
Alas, ultimately your fate is your own decision
Remain as you are - or cross the Rubicon!"

Many Malaysian organisations have joined the debate such as Sahabat Alam Malaysia (SAM), Borneo Resource Institute (BRIMAS) and Rengah Sarawak. These grassroots organisations have supported indigenous rights and accused the Sarawak state government of repeated neglect of Sarawak's indigenous citizens and exploitation of Sarawak's natural resources. The Penan are more impoverished than ever, confined in sub-standard living conditions that, despite government promises, lack the most basic of facilities and infrastructure. Those who are forced to live in government settlements are constantly fatigued by frequent food shortages and poor health, with little access to (inadequate) health care. Many of the Dayak population have also struggled to get accustomed to a settled lifestyle and adopt agricultural skills, which they must employ more and more as their forests increasingly dwindle.

The opposition party Parti Keadilan Rakyat has also taken up the cause of the indigenous people's plight, claiming that they are "living lives of quiet desperation that now and then flares up in action that invites police attention, not to mention the notice of the rest of Malaysians who don't quite know what it is to be under the tyranny of geography." With the help of such NGOs many Penan communities have mapped their proposed ancestral lands and filed claims in Sarawak's courts in the hope of preventing and deterring illegal logging of their forests. A precedent was set in 2001 when an Iban village of Rumah Nor won a court victory against Borneo Pulp and Paper and the Sarawak Government for violating their Native Customary Right (NCR) or adat. The victory was recently publicised in a short documentary, named Rumah Nor, by the Borneo Project. The verdict is being threatened by a Federal Court appeal by the state government and Borneo Pulp and Paper. However, 19 Penan communities have now mapped their NCR and four are beginning litigation and in others the logging has more or less stopped in the territory where litigation is pending. Indigenous action has therefore shifted from the human blockades of logging roads to empowerment through the political and legal system and international publicity.

The Penan's future also hangs on Taib Mahmud's decision to either adhere or extinguish plans for the Magoh Biosphere Reserve. However, it is Taib Mahmud who is responsible for approving and denying all logging licences. It is he and his closest friends, political associates, senior military offices and family relatives who own more or less the entire logging industry. Thus, the logging of the Sarawak has generated enormous wealth for these principle elites. Mahmud therefore, has a strong economic interest in continuing to allow illegal logging in the proposed biosphere reserve areas.

In a 2010 media release, the Malaysian logging company Samling Global Ltd. was excluded from the Government Pension Fund Global (GPFG). This decision was made on the recommendations from the Council of Ethics’ assessment that Samling Global, and two other companies, “are contributing to or are themselves responsible for grossily [sic] unethical activity”. The committee documented “extensive and repeated breaches of the licence requirements, regulations and other directives in all of the six concession areas that have been examined. Some of the violations constitute very serious transgressions, such as logging outside the concession area, logging in a protected area that was excluded from the concession by the authorities in order to be integrated into an existing national park, and re-entry logging without Environmental Impact Assessments.” If more investors, finance institutions and timber traders worldwide follow suit and cut business ties with Samling Global, this could also make the Penan's future a little brighter.

== Notable Penan ==
- Ezra Uda - the first Penan graduated from University, first penan work as Administrative staff in Sarawak Minster Department and Telang Usan District Officer in Sarawak.

== See also ==
- Stranger in the Forest, a travel report by Eric Hansen
- Redheads, a comic eco-thriller novel set in a fictional sultanate in Borneo, which describes the Penan plight, by Paul Spencer Sochaczewski
- Tawai: a Voice From The Forest, a documentary by Bruce Parry

== Notes ==
1. Sarawak Peoples Campaign, Ian Mackenzie, accessed 2005-04-05
2. Nomads of the Dawn, The Penan of the Borneo Rainforest, Chapter
