= Bruno Manser =

Swiss environmental activist

- Manser, ca. 1987
- Born: 25 August 1954; Basel, Switzerland
- Disappeared: 25 May 2000 (aged 45); Bukit Batu Lawi, Sarawak, Malaysia
- Status: Missing for 26 years, 4 months and 21 days; Legally dead on 10 March 2005
- Other names: Laki Penan; Laki Tawang; Laki e'h metat
- Occupations: Human rights activist Environmentalist
- Organization: Bruno Manser Fonds
- Title: Chairman
- Predecessor: Post created

Bruno Manser (25 August 1954 – presumed dead 10 March 2005) was a Swiss environmentalist and human rights activist. From 1984 to 1990, he stayed with the Penan people in Sarawak, Malaysia, organising rainforest blockades against timber companies. After he emerged from the forests in 1990, he engaged in public activism for rainforest preservation and the human rights of indigenous peoples, especially the Penan, which brought him into conflict with the Malaysian government. He also founded the Swiss non-governmental organization (NGO) Bruno Manser Fonds in 1991. Manser disappeared during his last journey to Sarawak in May 2000 and is presumed dead.

== Early life and education ==
Bruno Manser was born in Basel, Switzerland, on 25 August 1954, in a family of three girls and two boys. During his younger days, he was an independent thinker. His parents wanted him to become a doctor, and he studied medicine informally. Manser later completed his upper secondary school, the first in his family to do so.

At age 19, Manser spent three months in Lucerne prison because, as an ardent follower of non-violent ideologies espoused by Mahatma Gandhi (Satyagraha), he refused to participate in Switzerland's compulsory military service. After leaving prison in 1973, he worked as a sheep and cow herder at various Swiss Alpine pastures for twelve years. During this time, Manser became interested in handicrafts, therapeutics, and speleology. He laid bricks, carved leather, kept bees, and wove, dyed, and cut his own clothes and shoes. He also regularly pursued mountaineering and technical climbing.

At the age of 30, Manser went to Borneo, looking to live a simpler life.

== Searching for Penans ==
In 1983, Manser went to the Malaysian state of Terengganu and stayed with a family. In 1984, while learning more about the rainforests, Manser learned of a nomadic tribe known as the Penan. After learning more about the tribe, he decided to attempt to live amongst them for a few years and travelled to the East Malaysian state of Sarawak in 1984 on a tourist visa.

In Malaysia, Manser first joined an English caving expedition to explore Gunung Mulu National Park. After the expedition, he stepped deeper into the interior jungles of Sarawak, intending to find the "deep essence of humanity" and "the people who are still living close to their nature." However, he quickly became lost and ran out of food while exploring the jungle, then fell ill after eating a poisonous palm heart.

After these setbacks, Manser finally found Penan nomadic tribes near the headwaters of the Limbang river at Long Seridan in May 1984. Initially, the Penan people tried to ignore him. After a while, the Penan accepted him as one of their family members.

In August 1984, Manser went to Kota Kinabalu, Sabah, to obtain a visa to visit Indonesia. On the Indonesian visa, he entered Kalimantan, then illegally crossed the border back into Long Seridan. His Malaysian visa expired on 31 December 1984.

== Life with the Penans ==
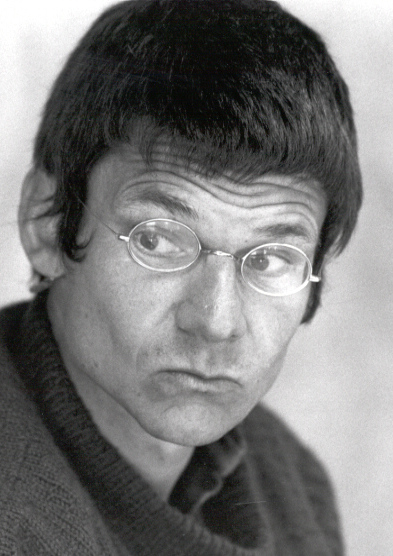
Manser, 1993

Manser learned about survival skills in the jungle and familiarised himself with the Penan's culture and language. The Penan tribal leader in Upper Limbang, named Along Sega, became Manser's mentor. During his stay with the Penan, Manser adopted their way of life. He dressed in a loincloth, hunted with a blowgun, and ate primates, snakes, and sago. Manser's decision to live as a member of the Penan was ridiculed in the West, and he was dismissed as a "White Tarzan". Within the Penan, however, Manser was known as "Laki Penan" (Penan Man), having earned the respect of the tribe that adopted him.

Manser created notebooks that were richly illustrated with drawings, notes, and 10,000 photographs during his six-year stay from 1984 to 1990 with the Penan people. Some of his sketches include cicada wing patterns, how to carry a gibbon with a stick, and how to drill holes on a blowpipe. These notebooks were later published by Christoph Merian Verlag press in Basel. Manser also created audio recordings of oral histories told by Penan elders and translated them. He claimed that the Penan people were never argumentative or violent during his time with them.

In 1988, Manser tried to reach the summit of Bukit Batu Lawi but was unsuccessful, finding himself hanging on a rope without anything to grab on for 24 hours. In 1989, he was bitten by a red tailed pit viper but was able to treat the snake bite himself. He also got a malaria infection while living in the jungles.

Unfortunately, deforestation of Sarawak's primaeval forests started during Manser's stay with the Penan. As a result, the Penan suffered from reduced vegetation, contaminated drinking water, fewer animals available for hunting, and the desecration of their heritage sites. Manser worked with Along Sega to teach the Penan how to organise road blockades against advancing loggers. Manser organised his first blockade in September 1985.

== Activism ==
Manser gave many lectures in Switzerland and abroad, making connections to people within the European Union and the United Nations. As an activist, he visited American and African jungles, staying in various locations for a few weeks.

He returned almost every year after leaving the Penan to follow up with the logging activities and to provide assistance to the tribe, often entering these areas illegally, crossing the border with Brunei and Kalimantan, Indonesia. He discovered that logging conglomerates such as Rimbunan Hijau, Samling, and the WTK Group continued their operations in Sarawak rainforests. As a result, Manser organised the Voices for the Borneo Rainforests World Tour after he left the Sarawak forests in 1990. Manser, Kelabit activist Anderson Mutang Urud, and two Penan tribe members travelled from Australia to North America, Europe, and Japan.

On 17 July 1991, during the 17th G7 summit, Manser climbed unaided to the top of a 30-foot high lamp post outside of the summit's media centre in London. After reaching the top, he unrolled a banner that displayed a message about the plight of Sarawak rainforests. He chained himself to the lamp post for two and a half hours. His protest also coincided with protests by Earth First! and the London Rainforest Action Group. Police used a hoist to reach the top of the lamp post and cut his chains. Manser climbed down the lamp post without force at 1:40 PM. He was then taken to the Bow Street police station and held until the summit ended at 6:30 PM, when he was released without being charged with an offence.

Later in 1991, Manser set up Bruno Manser Fonds (BMF), a fund designed to help conserve the rainforests and the indigenous population in Sarawak. He ran the fund from his home at Heuberg 25, Basel, Switzerland.

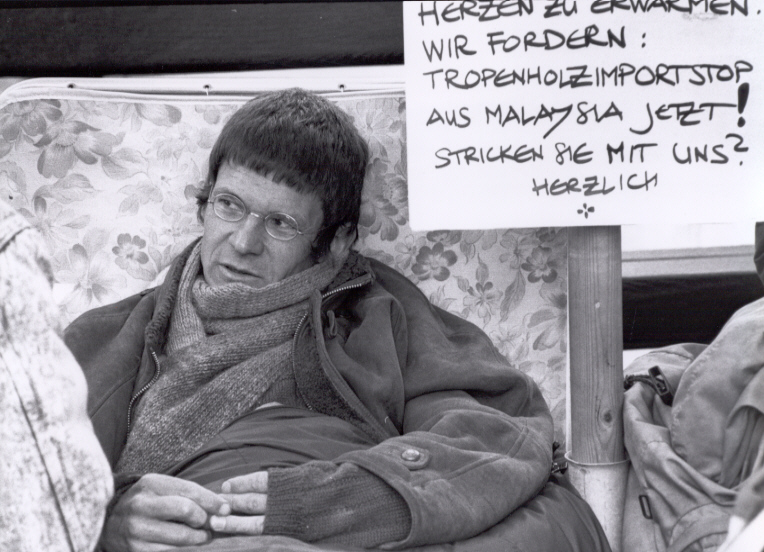
Manser in 1993, during a hunger strike

In June 1992, Manser parachuted into a crowded stadium during the Earth Summit in Rio de Janeiro, Brazil. In December 1992, he led a twenty-day hunger strike in front of the Marubeni Corporation headquarters in Tokyo. In 1993, he went on a sixty-day hunger strike at the Federal Palace of Switzerland ('"Bundeshaus") to press the Swiss Federal Assembly on enforcing a ban on tropical timber imports and mandatory declarations of timber products. The hunger strike was supported by 37 organisations and political parties. Manser only stopped the hunger strike after his mother requested that he do so. After Manser's disappearance, the Federal Assembly finally adopted the Declaration of Timber Products on 1 October 2010, with a transition period allowed until the end of 2011.

In 1995, Manser went to Congo rainforests to document the effects of wars and logging on Mbuti people. In 1996, on the German-language programme fünf vor zwölf (At the Eleventh Hour), Manser and his friend Jacques Christinet used auxiliary cable to drop themselves down 800 meters onto the Klein Matterhorn aerial cable car and hung sizable banners there. They reached the dangerous speed of 140 kilometres per hour while riding on a self-made rider with steel wheels and ball bearings.

In 1997, Manser and Christinet tried to enter Peninsular Malaysia from Singapore to fly a motorised hang-glider during the 1998 Commonwealth Games in Kuala Lumpur. However, he was recognised at the border and denied entry into Malaysia. They then decided to swim across the Straits of Johor into Malaysia, but later abandoned the plan as it involved a lengthy 25-kilometre swim and a passage through a swamp across the straits. They planned an alternative route, opting to row a boat from an Indonesian island into Sarawak. However, BMF received a warning from the Malaysian embassy warning of the consequences for such an act. In 1998, Manser and Christinet travelled to Brunei and swam across the 300-metre-wide Limbang river at night. Christinet was almost fatally injured by drifting logs along the river. They spent three weeks in Sarawak hiding from the police. During that period, they attempted to order four tons of 25-centimetre nails for the Penan to hammer into the tree trunks, which could have caused serious injuries to loggers when the embedded nails inevitably came into contact with chainsaws.

=== Impact ===
In 1986, Manser's representative in Switzerland, Roger Graf, wrote about sixty letters to Western media outlets, but none took notice of them. It was only in March 1986 that Rolf Bökemeier, an editor for the GEO magazine based in Hamburg, Germany, who also specialised in indigenous people, wrote a letter of reply to Graf. In October 1986, GEO published a 24-page article entitled: "You have the world - leave us the wood!" which included photos taken during their undercover tours with Manser, as well as Manser's drawings. The article was later reprinted all over the world in Australia, Japan, and Canada, leading to the attention of human rights and environmental organisations and green parliamentarians around the world.

After hearing of Manser's actions, then-Congressman Al Gore condemned logging activities in Sarawak. Prince Charles also described the treatment for the Penan as "genocide." The BBC and the National Geographic Channel produced documentaries about the Penan, and Penan stories were also featured on ABC's Primetime Live. Universal Studios started to develop an action-adventure horror script where the Penan used their forest wisdom to save the world from catastrophe. The Penan also received coverage in Newsweek, Time, and The New Yorker. Warner Bros screenwriter David Franzoni also developed a script named My Friend Bruno after they signed a contract with Manser in January 1992. Manser received $20,000 a year until 1998 for the rights to film his life. However, due to its unsatisfying ending, the script was not taken up by the studio.

== Response from Malaysian authorities ==
Manser's actions drew anger from Malaysian authorities, who declared him persona non grata in the country. A reported bounty for his capture ranging from US$30,000 to US$50,000 has been circulated by word-of-mouth, but the source of the bounty is unknown. By 1990, Malaysia declared Manser as the "number one enemy of the state" and sent special units to search for him. Using a forged passport and styling his hair differently, Manser returned to Switzerland in 1990 to inform the public about the situation in Sarawak through the Swiss media.

=== Response by Malaysian federal government ===
Malaysian Prime Minister Mahathir Mohamad blamed Manser for disrupting law and order. Mahathir wrote a letter to Manser, telling him that it was "about time that you stop your arrogance and your intolerable European superiority. You are no better than the Penan." In March 1992, Mahathir wrote another letter to Manser:

As a Swiss living in the laps of luxury with the world's highest standard of living, it is the height of arrogance for you to advocate that the Penans live on maggots and monkeys in their miserable huts, subjected to all kinds of diseases.

— Mahathir Mohamad on 3 March 1992

=== Response by Sarawak state government ===
The Sarawak government defended its logging policy by stating that revenue from timber sales is needed to feed more than 250,000 of the state's population. Sarawak Chief Minister Abdul Taib Mahmud said, "It is hoped that outsiders will not interfere in our internal affairs, especially people like Bruno Manser. The Sarawak government has nothing to hide. Ours is an open liberal society." Sarawak Minister of Housing and Public Health James Wong said that, "We don't want them [the Penan] running around [in jungles] like animals. No one has the ethical right to deprive the Penans of the right to assimilation into Malaysian society." The Sarawak government tightened the entry of foreign environmentalists, journalists, and film crews into the state, and allowed logging companies to hire criminal gangs to subdue the indigenous people.

=== Arrest attempts ===
Manser was first arrested on 10 April 1986 after being spotted by police inspector Lores Matios. He was delivering a document for Kelabit chiefs at Long Napir to sign to confirm their wish of further protecting their territories. At the same time, Matios was also on holiday at Long Napir. He immediately arrested Manser for breaking immigration law and brought him to Limbang police station for interrogation. Manser was not handcuffed, as the inspector did not carry them while on holiday. During the 90-minute ride to Limbang, the Land Rover that carried Manser came close to running out of petrol. While the vehicle stopped to refuel after crossing a bridge, Manser was urinating at the side of the road. While Matios was steps away giving orders to subordinates, Manser took the opportunity to run away, dive into dense undergrowth, and run across the Limbang river by jumping from stone to stone. Matios shouted at him and used his pistol to fire two shots at Manser, but he successfully escaped capture.

On 14 November 1986, Manser met with James Ritchie, a reporter from the New Straits Times, in an isolated hut in the Limbang jungles. Ritchie came by helicopter to interview Manser. After the interview, Ritchie told Manser that: "As a human being, you are right. Yet as a citizen of this country I have to say no to you, Please don't be angry with me if the story doesn't sound too good." After Ritchie's team left, Manser stayed in the hut until the next day. As he went to the mouth of the Meté river to wash himself, he noticed a boat mooring at the river. He heard a friendly voice called him, "Oh, Laki Dja-au!" but instead saw two soldiers pursuing him. The soldiers were instructed to capture Manser alive without firing any bullets. Manser immediately put down his blowpipe and a rucksack on the river bank, then dove into the river and disappeared under the heavy undergrowth of the forest floor. Manser successfully evaded capture, but he lost seven months of his drawings and notebooks in the rucksack. Feeling betrayed, Manser wrote a complaint letter against Ritchie to the New Straits Times and it was published on 1 February 1987. However, Ritchie denied any involvement in Manser's arrest.

On 25 March 1990, Manser was disguised as "Alex Betge" to board MH 873 flight from Miri to Kuching. In the airport, Manser and his friend met police inspector Lores Matios at the boarding area. However, Matios was on his way to take a law exam at Kuching and he didn't notice the disguised Manser on board. Manser arrived in Kuching uneventfully and then took a flight on 26 March to Kuala Lumpur. On 27 March, Swiss ambassador to Kuala Lumpur Charles Steinhaeuslin made a surprise visit to the Sarawak chief minister in Kuching.

== Dealing with Abdul Taib Mahmud ==
In mid-1998, Manser offered an end of hostilities with the Sarawak government if Chief Minister Taib Mahmud would be willing to cooperate with him in building a biosphere around the Penan's territory. Manser also wanted the government to forgive him for breaking Malaysian immigration laws. The offer was denied. His successive attempts to establish communications with Taib Mahmud failed. Manser planned to deliver a lamb named "Gumperli" to Taib Mahmud by air as a symbol of reconciliation during the Hari Raya Aidilfitri celebration. However, the Malaysian consulate at Geneva pressured airlines not to transport the lamb to Sarawak. Manser later carried the lamb with him on a plane and parachuted over the United Nations Office at Geneva, hoping to bring international attention to Sarawak.

In March 1999, Manser successfully passed Kuching immigration by disguising himself in a business suit, carrying a briefcase, and wearing a badly knotted tie. On 29 March, he flew a motorised paraglider, carrying a toy lamb knitted by himself while wearing a T-shirt with the image of a sheep, and made a few turns above Taib Mahmud's residence in Kuching. There were ten Penan tribe members waiting on the ground to greet Manser. At 11:30 AM, he landed the glider beside a road just outside Taib Mahmud's residence and was immediately arrested. He was then transported to Kuala Lumpur, briefly imprisoned, then deported back to Switzerland via Malaysia Airlines Flight MH2683. Manser was seen playing with his knitted toy lamb by his jailers.

By 2000, Manser admitted that his efforts did not bring positive changes to Sarawak. His success rate in Sarawak was "less than zero" and he was deeply saddened by the result. On 15 February 2000, just before his last trip to Sarawak, Manser said that, "[t]hrough his logging license policies, Taib Mahmud is personally responsible for the destruction of nearly all Sarawak rainforests in one generation."

== Disappearance ==
On 15 February 2000, Manser left to visit his Penan friends via the jungle paths of Kalimantan, Indonesia, accompanied by BMF secretary John Kuenzli and a film crew. After a period of time, Kuenzli and the film crew left Manser in the Kalimantan jungles. At the time, Manser was still writing postcards to his friends. Manser continued his journey with another friend who knew the way around the territory. The trip continued for two weeks, crossing mountains and rivers on foot and by boat. Manser slept on a hammock while his friend slept on the ground. On 18 May, they reached the Sarawak/Kalimantan border, spending their final night there. Manser asked his friend to carry a postcard back to Charlotte, his girlfriend in Switzerland. According to his friend, Manser looked healthy when they parted ways. Manser complained about diarrhoea and a broken rib in the postcard.

According to Kuenzli, Manser crossed the Sarawak/Kalimantan border on 22 May with the help of a local guide. His last known communication was a letter mailed to Charlotte while hiding in Bario. In the letter, Manser said he was very tired while waiting for the sun to set before continuing his journey along the logging roads. The letter was deposited at the Bario post office and reached Switzerland with a Malaysian stamp, but without a post office stamp. Manser was last seen carrying a 30-kilogram backpack by his Penan friend, Paleu, and Paleu's son on 25 May 2000. They accompanied Manser until they saw Bukit Batu Lawi. Manser stated his intention to climb the mountain alone and requested Paleu to leave him there. Manser has not been seen since.

== Search expeditions ==
BMF and the Penan tried to search for Manser without any success. Areas around the Limbang River were searched by the Penan. Penan expedition teams tracked Manser to his last sleeping place. They followed Manser's machete cuts into the thick forests until the trail reached the swamp at the foot of Bukit Batu Lawi. There was no trace of him in the swamp, going back from the swamp, or a trace of anyone else coming into the area. BMF sent a helicopter to circle the limestone pinnacles. However, none of the search teams were willing to scale the last 100 metres of steep limestone that formed the peak of Batu Lawi. It is possible that Manser fell down the side of the mountain, but neither his body nor his belongings have been found. However, two local guides who brought Manser across the jungles of Sarawak were found. In desperation, fortune tellers and Penan necromancers were called. All of them agreed Manser was still alive. On 18 November 2000, BMF requested that the Swiss Federal Department of Foreign Affairs (FDFA) search for Manser. Investigations were carried out at the Swiss Consulate in Kuala Lumpur and the Swiss Honorary Consulate in Kuching.

== Aftermath ==
In January 2002, hundreds of Penan members organised a tawai ceremony to celebrate Manser. The Penan refer to Manser as Laki Tawang (man who has become lost) or Laki e'h metat (man who has disappeared), rather than his name, because speaking the names of the dead is taboo in Penan culture.

On 18 November 2001, eighteen months after his disappearance, he was awarded the International Society for Human Rights prize for Switzerland.

After search expeditions proved fruitless, a civil court in Basel-Stadt declared Manser to be legally dead on 10 March 2005. On 8 May 2010, a memorial service was held in Elisabethen church, Basel to mark the tenth anniversary of his disappearance. Roughly 500 people attended the service.

To celebrate Manser's 60th birthday on 25 August 2014, a species of goblin spider that was discovered by a Dutch-Swiss research expedition in Pulong Tau National Park in the 1990s is now named after Manser: Aposphragisma brunomanseri.

== Books ==
- Bruno Manser (1992). Voices from the Rainforests: Testimonies of a Threatened People. ISBN 978-9670960012. Written by Manser to introduce western readers to the life of a Penan.
- Carl Hoffman (2018). The Last Wild Men of Borneo: A True Story of Death and Treasure. William Morrow. ISBN 978-0062439024. Biography of Bruno Manser.

== Films ==
Manser made a film documentary:

- SAGO – A Film by Bruno Manser (1997), a documentation of the culture of the Penan

Several documentary films have been made about him. They are:

- Blowpipes and Bulldozers (1988)
- Tong Tana – En resa till Borneos inre (1989) (In the Forest – A Journey to the heart of Borneo)
- Lucky People Center International (1998)
- Tong Tana 2 – The Lost Paradise (2001)
- Bruno Manser – Laki Penan (2007)
- Bruno Manser – Die Stimme des Regenwaldes (2019), Swiss film by Niklaus Hilber [Paradise War – The Story of Bruno Manser]

== See also ==
- List of people who disappeared mysteriously: post-1970
- Missing person
