= History of Singapore Airlines =

History of Singapore Airlines

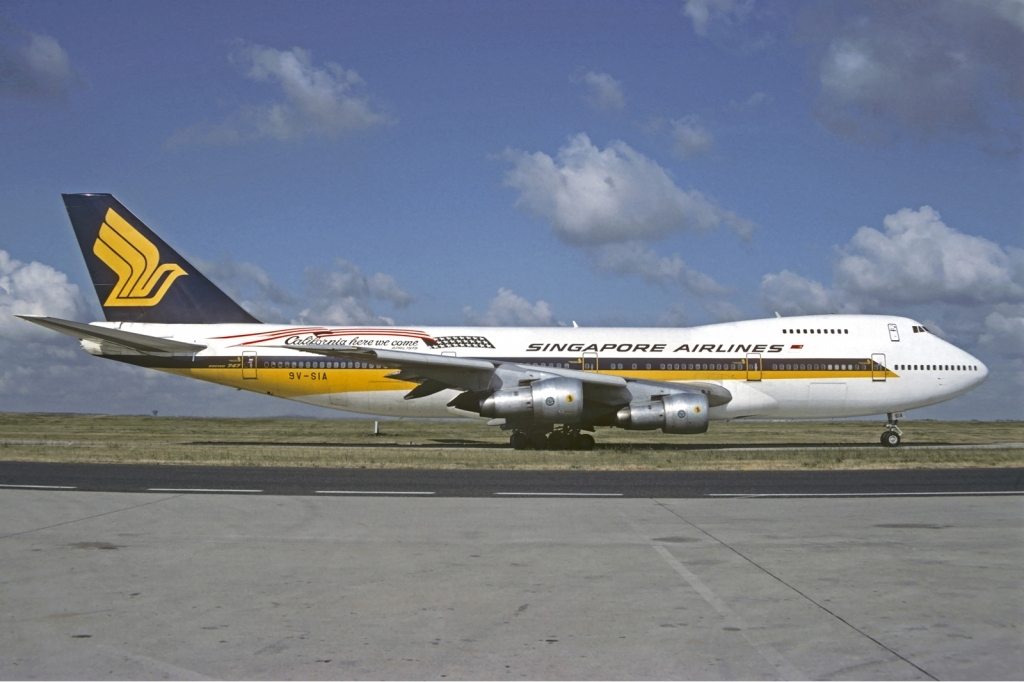
A SIA 747-200 at Paris Orly Airport in 1979

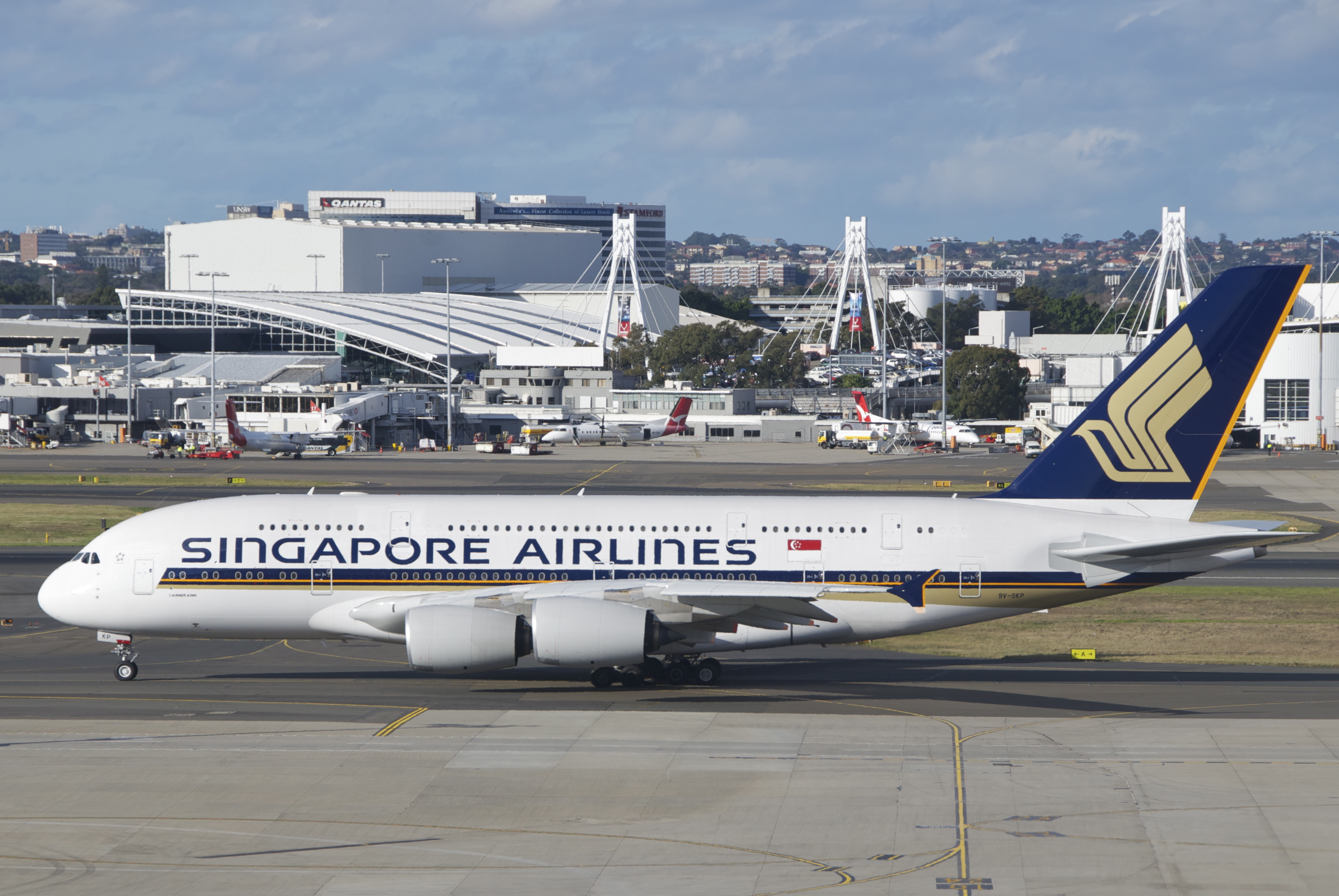
A SIA A380 at Sydney Airport in 2012

The History of Singapore Airlines, the flag carrier of the Republic of Singapore and based at the Singapore Changi Airport. Singapore Airlines, also known by its abbreviations of SIA or SQ, has often been ranked throughout its history as either amongst the best or the best airline in the world.

Ranked as a 5-star airline by Skytrax for the last 2 decades, It has also been ranked amongst the top 10 air carriers worldwide in terms of the scale of revenue-passengers-kilometres, and 10th in the world for the volume of international passengers carried.

Singapore Airlines is also one of the largest airline businesses in Asia, with nonstop or direct flights to destinations in Asia, Africa, Europe, the Middle East, and North America. The airline's slogan is "A Great Way To Fly". The airline is notable for not having significantly changed its livery throughout its history, as well as the Singapore Girl, which was first introduced in 1972.

== Origins ==
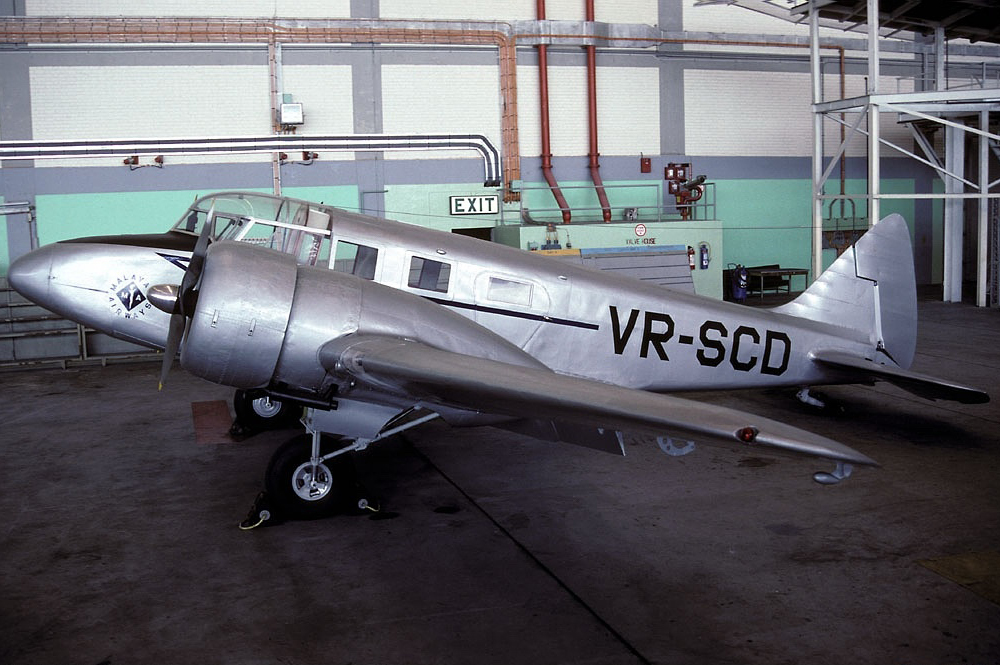
An Airspeed Consul (VR-SCD) – the first aircraft type operated by Malayan Airways, which was the forerunner of Singapore Airlines

Malayan Airways was established in 1937 through a collaboration between the Straits Steamship Company of Singapore and two British firms, the Ocean Steamship Company and Imperial Airways. The aim was to create a regional airline, which was formalised with the incorporation of Malayan Airways Limited on 21 October 1937. However, the airline faced a period of inactivity as its leadership recognized the challenges of competing with Wearne's Air Service, which already dominated the local air routes between Singapore and British Malaya. The small market size and the looming threat of World War II further delayed operations. As a result, the airline's leadership decided to conserve resources and postpone its launch until conditions became more favorable.

Following the disruptions of World War II and the cessation of Wearne's Air Service, the aviation sector in Southeast Asia underwent a significant transition. The gap left by the discontinuation of Wearne's Air Service provided an opportunity for the development of a new regional airline.

In response to this, Malayan Airways was launched on 1 May 1947. The airline's inaugural flight, a chartered journey from the British Straits Settlement of Singapore to Kuala Lumpur on 2 April 1947, set the stage for regular weekly scheduled flights to destinations such as Ipoh and Penang starting from 1 May 1947, utilizing Airspeed Consul twin-engined aircraft.

Continuing its expansion throughout the 1940s and 1950s, Malayan Airways received technical assistance from other Commonwealth airlines, including BOAC and Qantas Empire Airways. Joining IATA further propelled its growth. By 1955, Malayan Airways boasted a fleet featuring a substantial number of Douglas DC-3, and the company went public in 1957. The first two decades saw the operation of various aircraft, including the Douglas Douglas DC-4 Skymaster, the Vickers Viscount, the Lockheed 1049 Super Constellation, the Bristol Britannia, the de Havilland Comet 4 and the Fokker F27. This period of dynamic development set the stage for the emergence of two prominent carriers, Malaysia Airlines and Singapore Airlines, with Malayan Airways laying the foundation for their future success.

When Malaya, Singapore, Sabah and Sarawak formed the Federation of Malaysia in 1963, the airline's name was changed, from "Malayan Airways" to "Malaysian Airways". MAL also took over Borneo Airways. In 1966, following Singapore's separation from the federation, the airline's name was changed again, to Malaysia-Singapore Airlines (MSA). The next year saw a rapid expansion in the airline's fleet and routes, including the purchase of MSA's first Boeing aircraft, the Boeing 707s, as well the completion of a new high-rise headquarters in Singapore. Boeing 737s were added to the fleet soon after. In 1970, the airline began what turned out to be very lengthy negotiations aimed at obtaining approval to operate services to the US.

== Incorporation and growth ==
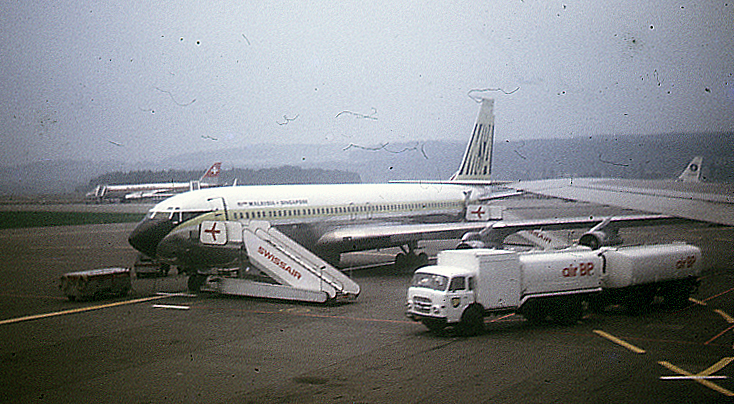
An MSA Boeing 707 at Zurich Airport (1972)

MSA ceased operations in 1972, and both Singapore Airlines and Malaysian Airlines System commenced operations in its place. The reason for this development was strategic: Singapore wanted to increase its international routes, but Malaysia wanted to develop its domestic network before moving on to international routes. Singapore Airlines kept all of MSA's Boeing 707s and 737s, and retained the international routes out of Singapore as well as the existing corporate headquarters in the city, with J.Y. Pillay, former joint chief of MSA, as its first chairperson. Female flight attendants continued to wear the sarong kebaya uniform, which had been first introduced in 1968. A local start-up advertising company, Batey Ads was given the right to market the airline, eventually selecting the sarong and kebaya-clad air stewardesses as an icon for the airline and calling them Singapore Girls. Its new name, callsign SIA and blue-yellow livery was officiated 1 July 1972.

SIA expanded almost overnight after the split from MSA in 1972, adding cities in the Indian subcontinent and Asia to its network, and new airliners, including Boeing 747s, to its fleet. The first two 747s arrived in the summer of 1973 and were deployed on the lucrative Singapore-Hong Kong-Taipei-Tokyo (Haneda Airport) run. As of 1976, SIA had an all-Boeing fleet of 21 aircraft: 5 Boeing 737-100s, 11 Boeing 707-300s, and 5 Boeing 747-200s. The airline's passenger network covered 28 cities in 23 countries, ranging from London in the north west to Auckland in the south east. The 737s flew regional services, including most of the company's 52 flights per week to Kuala Lumpur. The larger airliners operated on longer distance routes. Flights to London were operated daily by 747s, departing from Singapore International Airport at Paya Lebar at 8.30 pm each night, but with a variety of flight numbers and routings. On Tuesday and Saturday nights at 9.00 pm, a 707 flight departed for Amsterdam.

That year, SIA also operated daily 747 flights to Tokyo, daily 707 flights to Osaka, and daily flights to Sydney using a mix of 747s and 707s. Other flights went more frequently to Jakarta, Bangkok and Hong Kong, and less frequently to Perth, Melbourne and Auckland. The 707s were the company's workhorses; they flew 189 passenger flights per week. One of the 707s was configured as a 'pure' freighter, and each week it operated three out and back cargo services, to Amsterdam, Los Angeles and Paris, respectively. However, SIA passenger services to the US were still three years away.

In August 1976, negotiations between SIA and the US Civil Aeronautics Board (CAB) over possible SIA services to the US stalled over the key issue of the route any such services could take. SIA wanted to operate via Tokyo, the most lucrative transit point at the time, but the CAB thought that such a routing would have too significant an effect on the profits of SIA's US-based competitor, Pan Am. The CAB reportedly insisted that SIA would have to fly "in parallel" with Pan Am services to Singapore to earn approval, on a Singapore – Guam – Honolulu – San Francisco routing.

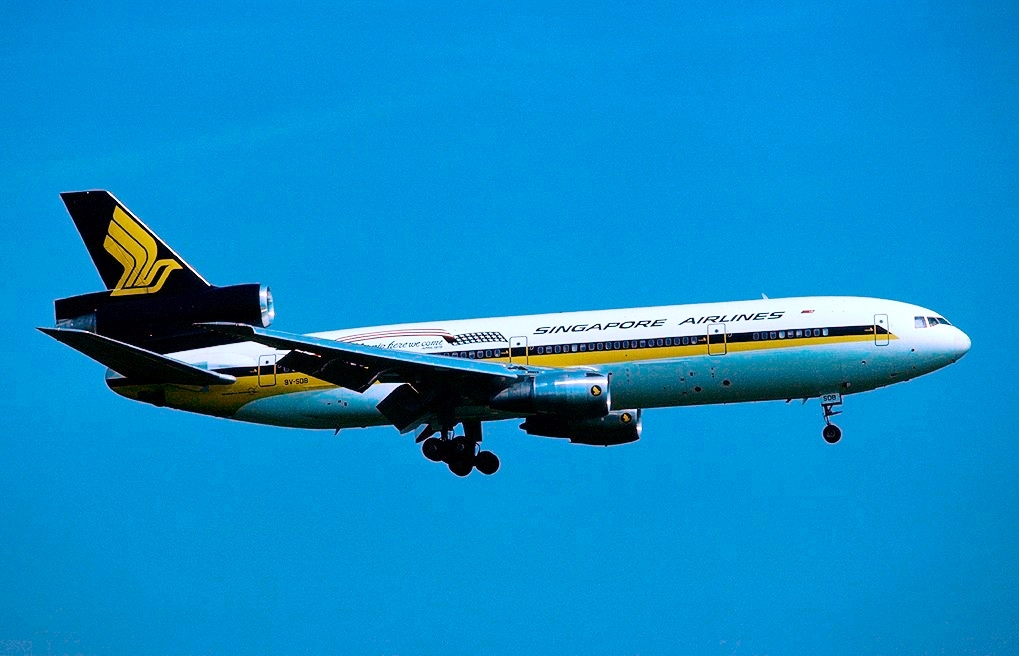
SIA DC-10-30 at Zürich in 1979

The following year, 1977, was SIA's 30th anniversary. To mark the occasion, the airline announced in late 1976 that it would be sponsoring the second running of the London–Sydney Marathon car rally, which was to take place in August-September 1977. In March 1977, negotiations between SIA and the CAB were resumed, and in August 1977 it was reported that the airline had placed an order for four McDonnell Douglas DC-10s. The same month, SIA took delivery of its first Boeing 727-200 Advanced, flying the aircraft on its inaugural service from Singapore to Manila. The B727 was SIA's successor to the B737-100s that it had inherited from MSA. In late September 1977, at the end of seven rounds of negotiations, SIA and the CAB finally agreed that the airline could operate passenger services to the US, on a route to San Francisco via Hong Kong, Guam and Honolulu, initially three times per week, and increasing to five times per week by 1980.

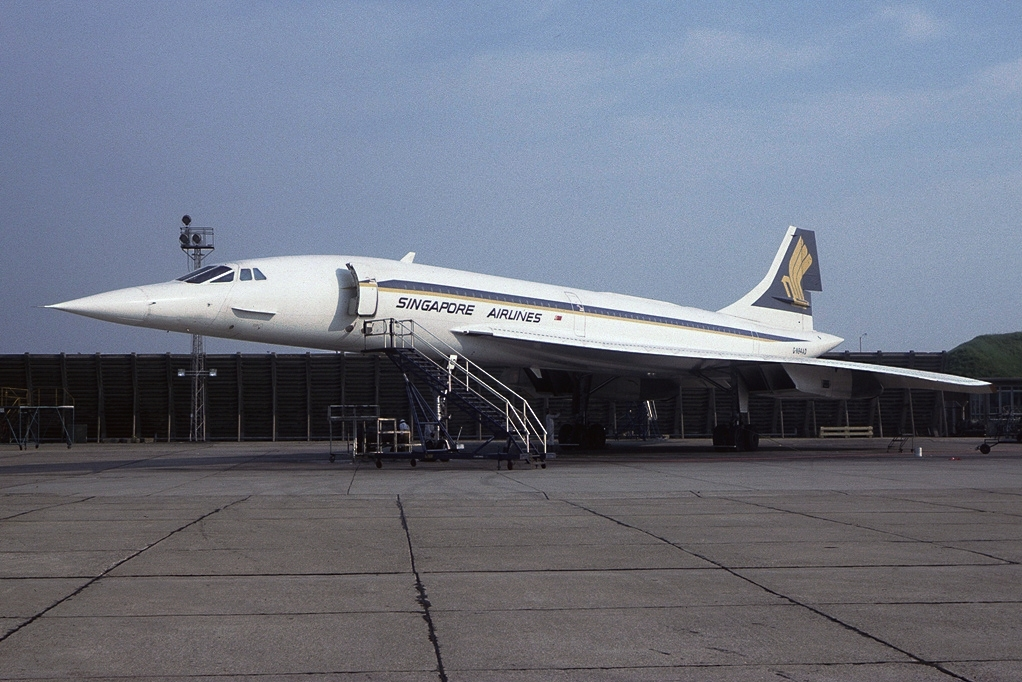
Concorde in Singapore Airlines livery at Heathrow in 1979

In December 1977, British Airways and SIA shared a Concorde for flights between London and Singapore via Bahrain. The aircraft, BA's Concorde G-BOAD, was painted in Singapore Airlines livery on the port side and British Airways livery on the starboard side. The service was discontinued after 4 days and three return flights because of noise complaints from the Malaysian government; it was reinstated on a new route bypassing Malaysian airspace. Then, India too cited problems with the boom and did not allow Concorde from reaching supersonic speeds in Indian airspace. Determined to make the route a success, British Airways and Singapore Airlines resumed flights on 24 January 1979, this time avoiding Malaysian airspace as well as Indian's. However, the service was discontinued for good on 1 November 1980. The two carriers cited decreasing traffic as one of the reasons, with the route estimated to be costing them around £2m a year.

Revenue passenger-miles/kilometers, in millions
Year	Traffic
1972	1,413 RPMs
1973	2,944 RPKs
1975	5,104 RPKs
1979	12,041 RPKs
1985	21,676 RPKs
1990	31,270 RPKs
1995	48,400 RPKs
2000	70,795 RPKs

Meanwhile, SIA extensively publicised and then introduced its new passenger services to the US. The marketing campaign, using the slogan "California here we come", included the painting of the slogan on many of SIA's airliners from July 1978. SIA initially planned to operate the US services using new Boeing 747-200 'Super B' aircraft, but the new jets were not going to arrive until approximately September 1979. Thus, when the airline inaugurated the route in April 1979, it did so with its new fleet of DC-10s, three of which had entered service. Operation of the first few of the US flights was hampered by a severe aviation fuel shortage in the US, due to production cuts by Iran. Then, on 25 May 1979, shortly after the fuel shortage had abated, an American Airlines DC-10 crashed in Chicago, causing 273 fatalities. Soon afterwards, and as a consequence of the crash, the US Federal Aviation Administration banned the flying of DC-10s in US airspace. SIA therefore had to switch its new US services to operation by 707s until late August 1979, when its new Boeing 747-200 'Super Bs' took over the route. The airline also sold all of its DC-10s by late 1983.

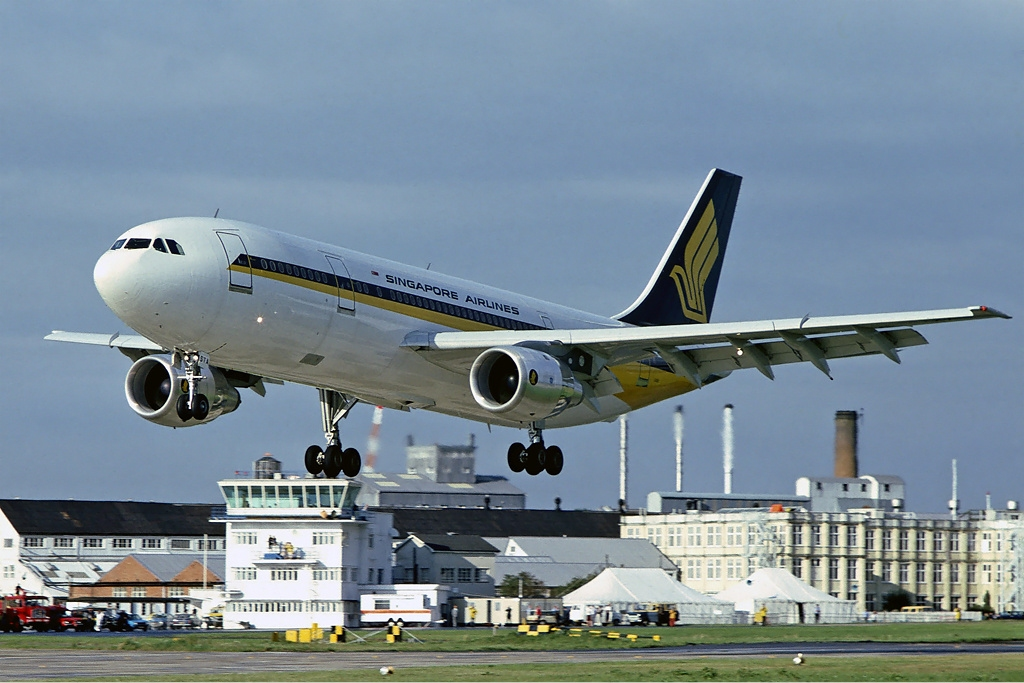
A Singapore Airlines Airbus A300 seen at the Farnborough Airshow in 1980

On 12 May 1981 at the stroke of midnight, Singapore Airlines' first ferry flight from London Heathrow Airport to the new Singapore Changi Airport . This flight was officially the world's first nonstop British commonwealth flight from London to Singapore. It was also Singapore Changi Airport's (including Terminal 1) very first commercial aviation flight with its first commercial plane, with Singapore Airlines SQ140 touching down at 00:00:00 Singapore Time/17:00:00 London Time with 140 passengers from London.

The 1980s saw the opening of the new airport and SIA corporate headquarters at Changi, along with expanded SIA services to United States, Canada, and additional European cities, with Madrid becoming the first Hispanic city to be served by the airline. Boeing 747-300s were leased and introduced into the SIA fleet in the early 1980s and named 'Big Tops'. The 747-300s replaced the 747-200s on all trans-pacific routes as well as the prime European destinations. Again a short-term affair was begun with a few Boeing 757s later followed by the addition of Airbus A310s and Airbus A300s The A310s became the Asian regional workhorse of the fleet, with the small A310-200 fleet serving until the late 1990s, and the much larger A310-300 fleet serving into the 2000s. In 1989, the first of 50 B747-400s was added to the fleet. The Airbus A340-300s augmented the 747-400s on long-range routes to Spain, Zürich, Copenhagen, San Francisco and cities not suitable for 747 service. Services extended to southern Africa in the 1990s when the airline began flights to Johannesburg in South Africa; Cape Town and Durban were later added. The 1990s also saw the opening of Terminal 2 in Changi Airport in 1991; all flight operations later moved to the new terminal. Police raided SIA's offices in Germany for offering tickets that were priced at such a low level they were allegedly illegal. The airline called a press conference condemning the police, which led to the raid being stopped.

== Twenty-first century ==
=== Overview ===
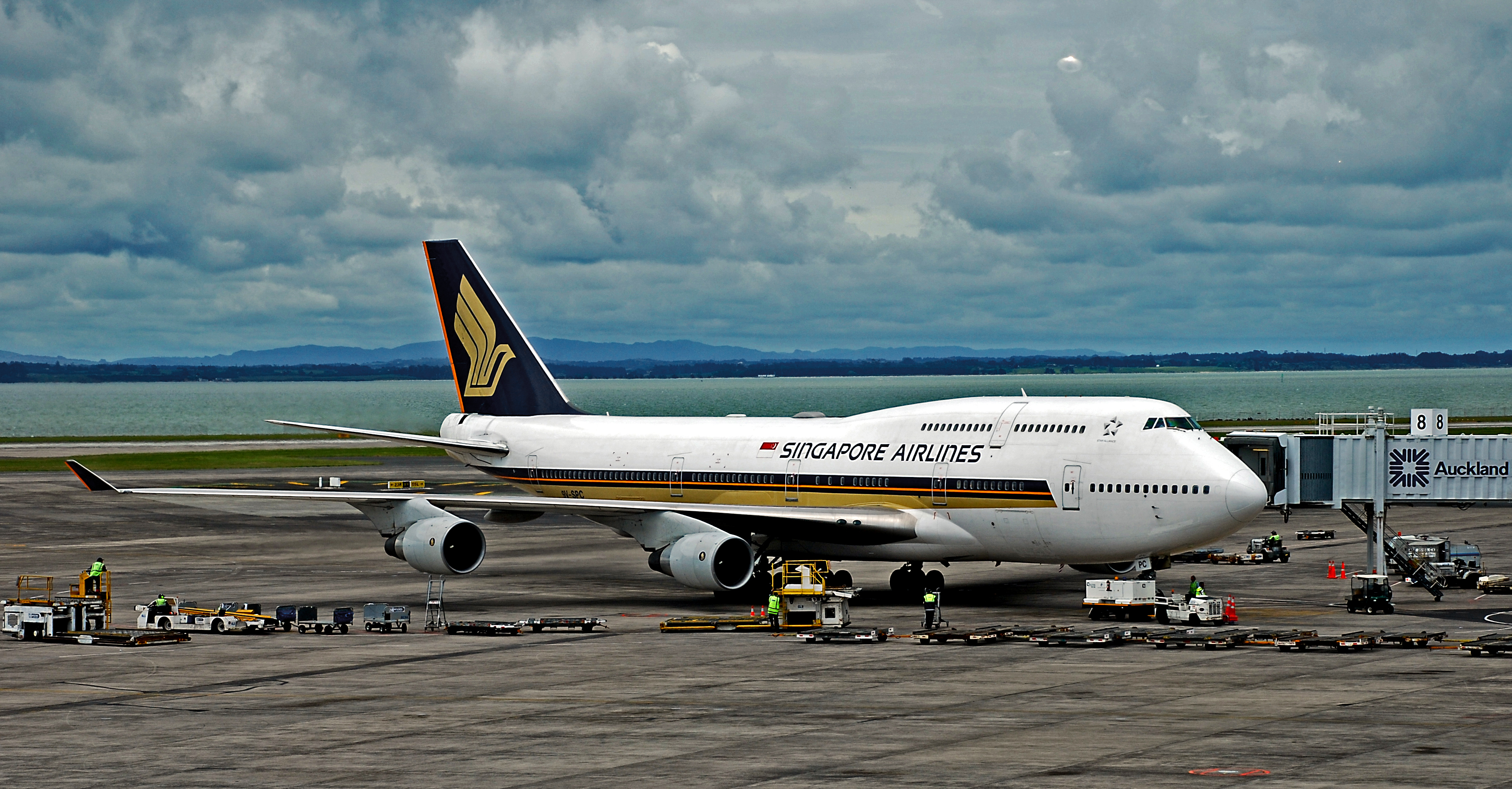
A Singapore Airlines Boeing 747-400, dubbed Megatop, at Auckland Airport, New Zealand. The Megatop was the flagship of the airline from 1989 until the introduction of the Airbus A380 in October 2007.

In 2004, SIA began non-stop trans-Pacific flights from Singapore to Los Angeles and Newark, utilising the Airbus A340-500. These flights marked the first non-stop air services between Singapore and the US. The Singapore to Newark flight held the record for the longest scheduled commercial flight, with a flying time of about 18 hours each way. Singapore Airlines converted its five Airbus A340-500 aircraft from a 64 Business Class/117 Premium Economy Class configuration to a 100-seat all-Business Class configuration for its routes to Newark and Los Angeles.

On 25 October 2007, SIA's first double decker Airbus A380-800 operated the type's inaugural revenue service, a flight from Singapore to Sydney. As of December 2023, Singapore Airlines is the world's second largest operator of the A380, after Emirates and alongside British Airways. SIA operates the A380 on routes to London, Zürich, Frankfurt, Paris, Mumbai, Beijing, Sydney, Melbourne, Los Angeles and New York. The airline is also currently a far reaching global carrier and a cornerstone member of Star Alliance.

In January 2009, SIA decided to stop its thrice weekly flights to Vancouver, Canada, due to less demand after the 2008 financial crisis. The last flight was scheduled to take place on 25 April 2009.

At a cabinet meeting on 22 February 2006, the government of Australia decided not to grant fifth freedom rights to Singapore Airlines on flights from Australia to the United States. Singapore Airlines had argued that transpacific flights from Australia suffered from under-capacity, leading to limited competition and relatively high air fares. The move was seen as a measure taken to protect Qantas from increased competition. SIA had encountered such protectionist measures in the past when SIA was shut out from the Toronto market after complaints from Air Canada, and was forced to stop flying Boeing 747-400s into Jakarta in the wake of protests from Garuda Indonesia when it could not use similar equipment to compete.

Singapore Airlines, along with Star Alliance partner South African Airways, was fined 25 million South African Rand (S$4.1 million) as an administrative penalty to partially settle a price-fixing investigation against the airline by the South African Competition Commission from 2008 to 2012.

On 6 April 2012, Singapore Airlines phased out the last passenger 747 in its fleet after 39 years of service. A final round-trip commemorative flight was operated from Singapore to Hong Kong and back with flight numbers SQ747 and SQ748 respectively. As well as an extended flying time, special meals, performances and inflight celebrations, passengers were given well stocked 747 goody bags. The airline continues to use dedicated freighter 747s to operate cargo flights.

The airline announced that it will end its direct flights from Singapore to both Newark and Los Angeles from 23 November 2013 and 20 October 2013, respectively. The flight to Newark was considered the longest flights in the world. However, Los Angeles will continue to be served from Singapore via Tokyo-Narita. On 13 October 2015, Singapore Airlines announced that it had signed an agreement with Airbus to be the launch customer of a new version of the Airbus A350 XWB called the A350-900ULR (for "Ultra Long Range"). The flights began on 11 October 2018, with regular daily commercially scheduled flights starting from 18 October 2018. This version of the A350 would have a 2 class layout, with 67 Business Class seats and 94 Premium Economy seats.

SIA was the launch customer for the Boeing 787-10, and it was delivered on 25 March 2018.

In June 2018, Singapore Airlines and its subsidiary Scoot began listing Taiwan as part of China (Taiwan, China) under the requirement of the China Civil Aviation Authority to all foreign airlines that operates flights into its country. Other airlines such as American Airlines, Delta Air Lines, United Airlines, Air Canada, Japan Airlines, All Nippon Airways, Lufthansa, Air New Zealand and Qantas, among others, also complied with this requirement.

=== Airbus A380 ===
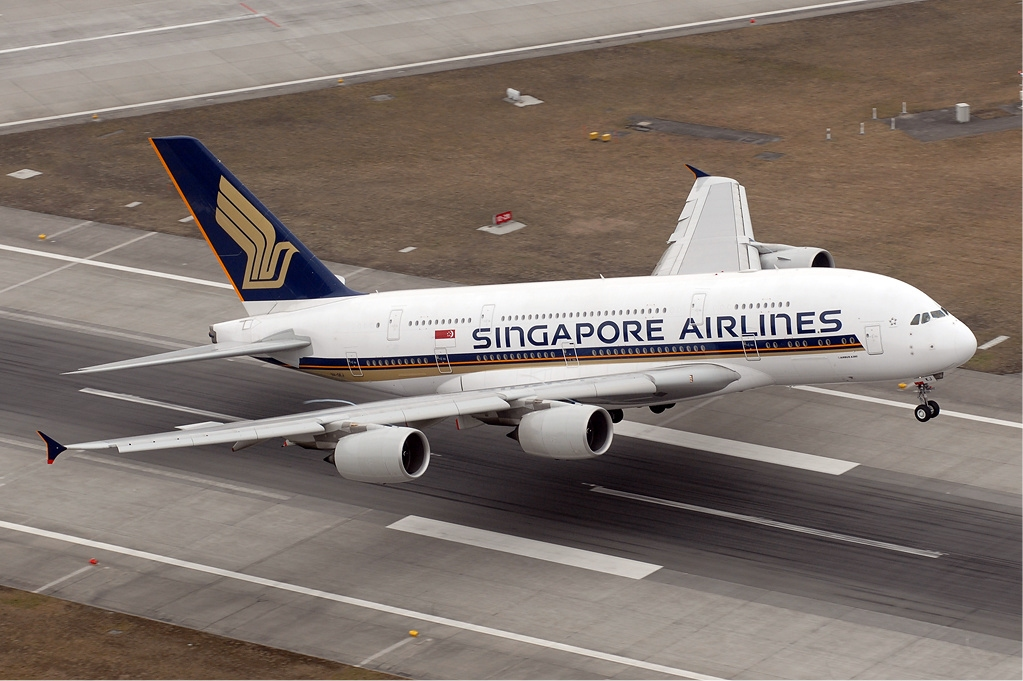
Singapore Airlines Airbus A380 taking off at Zurich Airport in March 2011

On 29 September 2000, SIA announced an order for up to 25 Airbus A3XX (as the A380 was known at the time). The US$8.6 billion order comprised a firm order of 10 aircraft, with options on another 15 airframes. The order was confirmed by Singapore Airlines on 12 July 2001. In January 2005, the airline unveiled the slogan "First to Fly the A380 – Experience the Difference in 2006", to promote itself as the first airline to take delivery of the A380-800, which was expected to take place in the second quarter of 2006. In June 2005, Airbus confirmed that due to unforeseen technical problems, initial deliveries of the Airbus A380 would be delayed by up to six months, with the first delivery now slated for November 2006. The announcement was met with fury by SIA's chief executive officer, Chew Choon Seng, who threatened to sue Airbus, saying: "Airbus took some time to acknowledge the delay in the timetable for the A380's entry into service...I would have expected more sincerity." He further stated that SIA would turn its attention to Boeing instead, since it would be receiving the Boeing 777-300ER before the A380. Nevertheless, SIA has indicated that this would not affect its promotional campaign.

In February 2006, the first A380 in full Singapore Airlines livery was flown to Singapore, where it was displayed at Asian Aerospace 2006. On 14 June 2006, Singapore Airlines placed an initial order for the Boeing 787 Dreamliner as part of its future aircraft expansion. The order consisted of 20 787-9s and rights for 20 more. This order came one day after Airbus announced that the A380 Superjumbo would be delayed by another 6 months. A third delay was announced on 3 October 2006, pushing the initial delivery of the first A380 to October 2007.

On 25 October 2007, the first commercial A380 service,SQ 380, carried 455 passengers from Singapore to Sydney, touching down in Sydney Airport at 3:24 pm local time, where it received significant attention from the media. The airline donated all revenue generated from the flight to three charities in a ceremony the next day in Sydney. SIA began regular services with the A380 on 28 October 2007. It eventually served London, Tokyo, Paris, Hong Kong, Melbourne, Zürich, Los Angeles, and New York JFK (via Frankfurt)

On 18 February 2009, SIA carried its one millionth A380 passenger.

In 2012, SIA announced that it would order a further five more A380 planes (along with an order for 20 Airbus A350 XWB orders).

In 2016 the airline confirmed that one A380 would be returned to its leasing company at the end of its 10-year lease in October 2017, with a decision still to be made regarding retention of four additional A380 aircraft whose leases expire between January and June 2018.

=== Fleet reductions ===
On 16 February 2009, the airline announced that it would remove 17 aircraft from its operating fleet between April 2009 and March 2010, as part of a cost-saving initiative to help counter falling passenger and cargo demand, having originally planned to phase out only four aircraft. The airline stated that it could not rule out delaying deliveries on aircraft already ordered.

=== Formula One ===
On 15 April 2014, Singapore Airlines announced that it would become the title sponsor for the Singapore Grand Prix, taking over Singtel, who had sponsored the event since 2008. In August 2015, the airlines announced that it would extend its sponsorship another 2 years until 2017. In April 2020 SIA announced that they would continue to sponsor the event until 2021, with SIA further extending its sponsorship for another 3 years until 2024.

=== Integration of SilkAir ===
On 18 May 2018, Singapore Airlines announced that the SilkAir fleet would undergo a major cabin product upgrade from 2020 before being fully merged into the parent company. As part of the merger, SilkAir's website was discontinued and integrated into Singapore Airlines' website on 31 March 2019. Cabin upgrades were expected to begin in 2020. On 11 February 2019, Singapore Airlines announced that Thompson Aero Seating had been selected for the upgrade of the SilkAir business class seats, prior to their incorporation into the Singapore Airlines fleet, with work beginning in May 2020.

On 28 January 2021, SilkAir officially ceased its operations and merged with Singapore Airlines.

=== COVID-19 pandemic ===
Like other airlines around the world, Singapore Airlines was badly hit by the effects of the global COVID-19 pandemic. As countries started to restrict international travel through their border controls, the airline began cutting capacity on 23 January 2020, up to 96% in March 2020. As a result, about 138 aircraft were grounded. The remaining flights were required to have everyone wearing face masks; social distancing was ruled out as it may incur high costs. Hot towels were replaced by wet wipes.

Operations at Changi Airport were consolidated to Terminal 3 in May 2020, with its service centre located at the ION Orchard shopping mall during the lockdown period of the government mandated "circuit breaker" from 7 April to 1 June 2020. On 10 April 2020, SIA announced that they would offer a full cash refund on Singapore Airlines, SilkAir and Scoot tickets bought during the COVID-19 pandemic. Alternatively, eligible passengers could choose a credit option for which they would be offered additional flight credits.

SIA's employees were affected as well. Flight crew were forced to take varying amounts of no-pay leave each month, with some also being retrenched. Retrenched staff were assisted through placements in other companies such as Lazada, Shopback and Shopee, and retained staff were allowed to be employed in healthcare or other essential COVID-19 prevention roles.

To help with its cashflow, the airline received additional financial support from the Singapore government with the Resilience Budget in March 2020, with the government providing industry wide co-funding of local workers' salary as well as operational costs. In addition, the airline announced on 27 March 2020 that it was raising some S$8.8 billion through a mixture of shares and bonds, which would be issued at a discount. As a result, the share ended the day down 43 cents or 6.6% from the end of the previous day's market close. On the same day, SIA received a rescue package of S$19 billion from its major shareholder Temasek Holdings which contained S$5.3 billion equity and S$9.7 billion convertible note. Singapore's biggest bank DBS lent S$4 billion to help SIA get over the crisis and position itself for expansion.

On 14 May 2020, Singapore Airlines announced a full year loss of S$212 million for the financial year 2019/2020, marking the airline's first loss in its 48 years of operation. The company recorded its worst ever results for the fiscal year ending in March 2021, posting a record US$3.2 billion annual loss and a decrease of 97.9% in passenger traffic due to border restrictions.

To ensure the safety of passengers amid the COVID-19 pandemic, Singapore Airlines launched an application that works like a Digital Health Passport. The application includes all passenger information along with COVID-19 diagnosis for easy passage via the airport.

==== Rebound ====
From June 2020 onwards, the airline progressively restarted flights that were declared safe to certain destinations, which would bring down flight reductions to 94% from the initial 96% cut reported in March. Transfers would only be allowed between airlines within the SIA Group and passengers would be segregated at Changi Airport between high-risk and low-risk zones. Over time, the number of additional destinations and frequency to certain destinations was adjusted.

On 11 September 2020, SIA decided to organise tours of SIA's training facilities, lunch services onboard A380s and delivery of meals to homes. On 12 October, bookings for meals on one of Singapore Airlines' A380s were sold out within 30 minutes. There would be four classes available for booking - economy ($50), premium economy ($90), business ($300) and suites ($600). The menus would include international cuisines and a Peranakan menu customised for the "restaurant". Each meal would come with two free alcoholic drinks and a free flow of other beverages. At the same time, diners would be entitled to other perks such as KrisShop discounts as well as a goodie bag. In addition, diners who wore traditional heritage wear would get an additional gift.

Over 2021 and 2022, SIA progressively resumed its destinations around the world as the aviation industry made a rebound, with some destinations returning to pre-pandemic flight frequencies. Cabin crew job applications have also rebounded to pre-pandemic levels.
