= Malaysia–Singapore Airlines =

National airline of Malaysia and Singapore (1966–1972)

- Logo used from 1967 to 1972

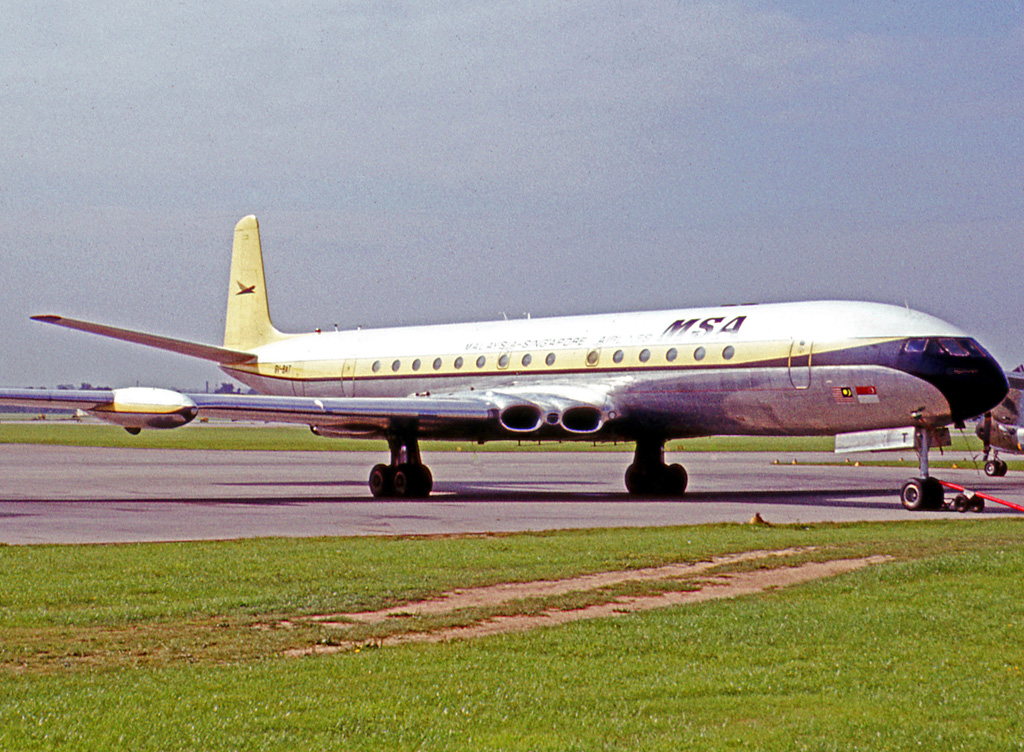
- De Havilland Comet 4 of Malaysia-Singapore Airlines
IATA	ICAO	Call sign
ML	MSA	MALAYSIAN
- Founded: 12 October 1937 (as Malayan Airways)
- Commenced operations: 1 May 1947 (as Malayan Airways); 27 November 1963 (as Malaysian Airways); 1 April 1965 (as Malaysia–Singapore Airlines)
- Ceased operations: 27 November 1963 (as Malayan Airways); 1 April 1965 (as Malaysian Airways); 30 September 1972 (restructured into Malaysian Airline System and Singapore Airlines)
- Hubs: Singapore–Kallang (1947–1955); Singapore–Paya Lebar (1955–1972)
- Secondary hubs: Kuala Lumpur–Simpang (1952–1965); Kuala Lumpur–Subang (1965–1972)
- Subsidiaries: Borneo Airways; Federation Air Service
- Fleet size: 13+
- Headquarters: Robinson Road, Raffles Place, Singapore

Malaysia–Singapore Airlines (abbreviation: MSA) was the binational flag carrier of Malaysia and Singapore that operated from 1966 to 1972. The airline originated as Malayan Airways (MAL), established in 1937 to provide air services within British Malaya and the surrounding regions. MAL also operated regional subsidiaries, notably Borneo Airways and Federation Air Service. In 1963, following the formation of the Federation of Malaysia, the airline was renamed Malaysian Airways to reflect the newly established political entity.

In 1966, after the separation of Singapore from Malaysia, the airline was rebranded as Malaysia-Singapore Airlines to serve both countries and facilitate the growing demand for air travel between them. The new airline significantly expanded its fleet and network, introducing modern aircraft including the Boeing 707 and Boeing 737, which enabled it to operate longer international flights and increase its presence in Europe, Australia and East Asia. It also bolstered its domestic services, connecting key urban areas across both countries with aircraft such as the Fokker 27 and BN-2 Islander for regional flights.

Despite its success, MSA encountered internal tensions between the governments of Malaysia and Singapore, stemming from differing priorities and ambitions for the airline's future. These conflicts ultimately led to the dissolution of the partnership in 1972, resulting in the formation of two independent airlines: Malaysian Airline System (MAS) (Note: Renamed into Malaysia Airlines Berhad (MAB) after the airline went bankrupt and was renationalised in 2015.) and Singapore Airlines (SIA). The end of MSA marked the conclusion of the carrier, paving the way for the continued growth of both national airlines.

== History ==
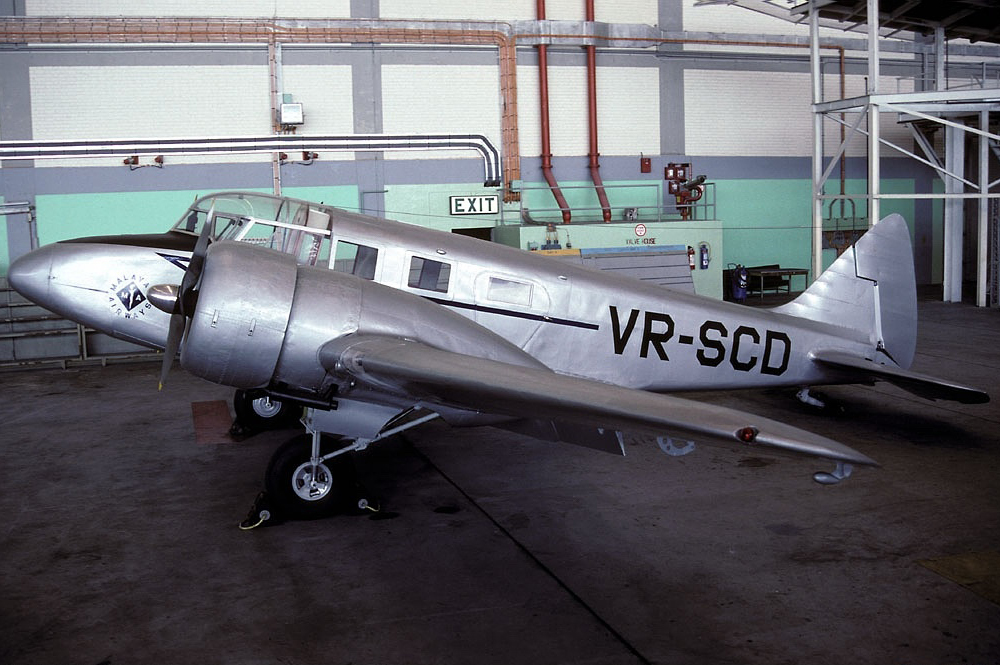
An Airspeed Consul, the first aircraft type operated by Malayan Airways, marking the airline's early beginnings in the 1940s.

=== Malayan Airways ===
==== 1937–1946: Foundation of Malayan Airways ====
Malayan Airways was founded in 1937 following the collaboration between the Straits Steamship Company of Singapore and two British firms, Ocean Steamship Company and Imperial Airways. Their goal was to establish a regional airline, which was formalised with the creation of Malayan Airways Limited on 12 October 1937.

However, the airline experienced a period of inactivity as its leadership recognised the challenges of competing with Wearnes Air Services, which already dominated the local air routes between Singapore and British Malaya. The small market size and the impending threat of World War II further delayed operations. As a result, the airline's leadership opted to conserve resources and postpone its launch until more favorable conditions emerged.

After the cessation of Wearnes Air Services following World War II, Malayan Airways was able to commence its operations, capitalising on the rising demand for air travel. This allowed the airline to broaden its network and establish itself as a key player in the region's aviation sector during the post-war period.

==== 1947–1950: From first flight to regional connections ====
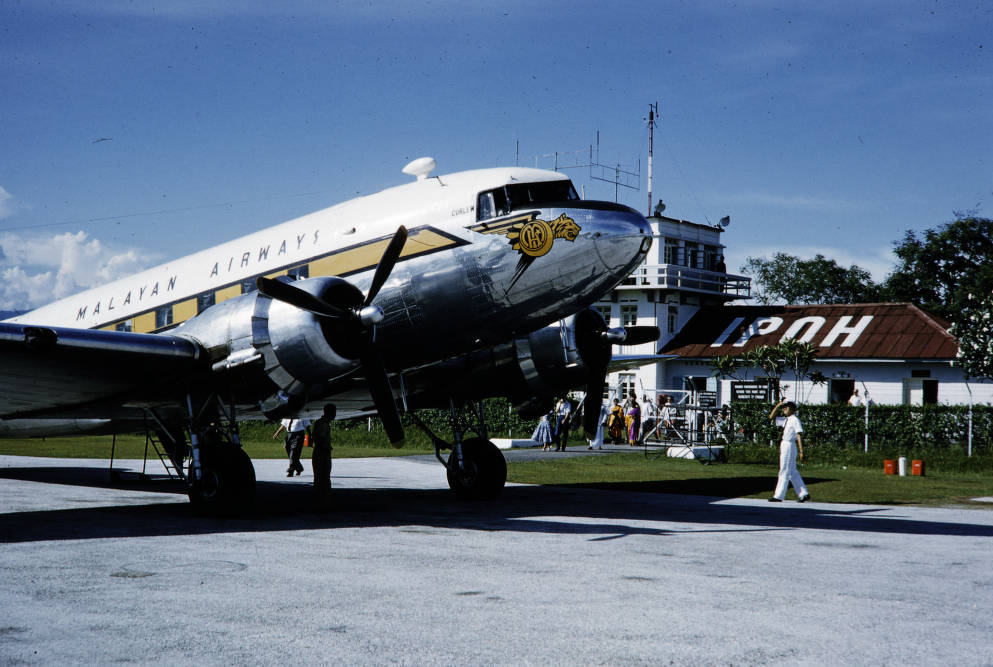
The Douglas DC-3 was a vital part of Malayan Airways' fleet in the 1950s, playing a crucial role in connecting regional destinations

The inaugural flight of Malayan Airways took place on 1 May 1947, between Singapore and Kuala Lumpur, operated by an Airspeed Consul aircraft. This marked the beginning of regular domestic air services, which were expanded to include other major cities such as Penang and Ipoh.

In the same year, Malayan Airways acquired the Douglas DC-3, which became a vital component of its fleet. This aircraft played a crucial role in connecting destinations across Malaya and neighboring regions, facilitating the airline's expansion and increasing its operational capacity. Malayan Airways began to expand its network to international destinations across Southeast Asia, such as Saigon (Ho Chi Minh City), Batavia (Jakarta), Palembang, Medan and Bangkok. Domestically, the airline also served routes to Kuantan and Kota Bharu. By 1950, the international network further expanded to include Mergui (Myeik) and Rangoon (Yangon).

==== 1950–1959: Growth and innovation ====
The 1950s were a transformative period for Malayan Airways, marked by significant expansion and modernisation. The airline’s infrastructure was enhanced with the construction of new airstrips and the upgrading of airports, which facilitated the growth of its network and the increasing demand for air travel in Southeast Asia. By 1952, the airline had added destinations such as Taiping, Malacca and Alor Setar, and further extended its network to towns in British Borneo, including Kuching, Sibu, Labuan, Jesselton (Kota Kinabalu) and Sandakan.

By the mid-1950s, Malayan Airways had established itself as a leading regional carrier, supported by significant advancements in aviation infrastructure. The opening of Paya Lebar Airport in Singapore in 1955 provided modern facilities to handle larger aircraft, while the 1956 upgrade of Kuala Lumpur Airport to international standards enabled the airline to expand its reach beyond regional destinations.

In February 1958, Malayan Airways Limited (MAL) transitioned into a public limited company. Ownership was shared among several key stakeholders: the British Overseas Airways Corporation (BOAC), Qantas and the governments of Malaya, Singapore and the Borneo territories. This restructuring marked a pivotal moment in the airline's development, enabling it to access greater resources and establish a foundation for further expansion within the region.

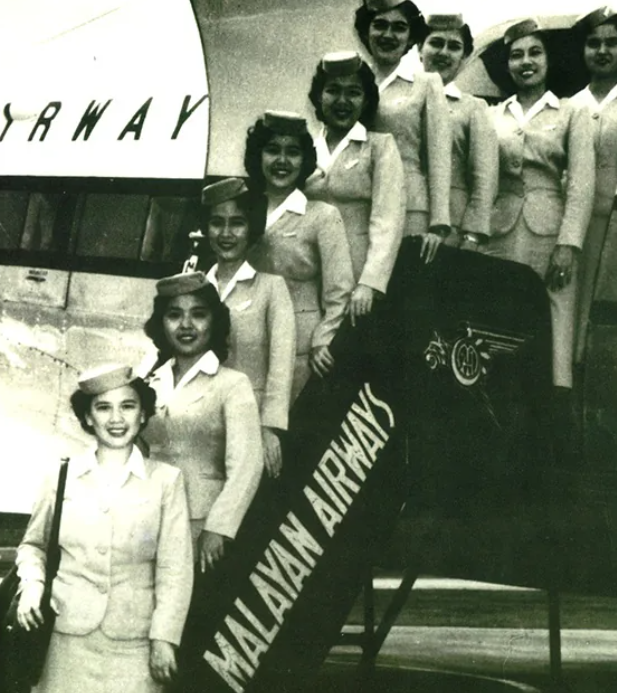
Malayan Airways air hostess

By 1958, Malayan Airways had further expanded its network to include flights to destinations such as Hong Kong, made possible by the newly acquired DC-4 aircraft. These developments solidified the airline’s position as a leading regional carrier and attracted an increasing number of international travelers.

==== 1960–1963: Fleet evolution and jet introduction ====
By 1960, Malayan Airways had developed an extensive regional network, including key routes such as Singapore to Hong Kong and Kuala Lumpur to Bangkok via Penang. Its fleet consisted of a mix of Douglas DC-3s, Bristol Britannia, Lockheed L-1049 Super Constellations and Vickers Viscounts, allowing the airline to accommodate a growing passenger base while improving service quality and operational efficiency.

The early 1960s marked the beginning of the jet age for Malayan Airways, as the airline embarked on a period of modernisation and fleet expansion. In 1963, the airline introduced its first jet aircraft, the de Havilland Comet, branded as the "Silver Kris." That same year, Malayan Airways also acquired Fokker F27 Friendship turboprop aircraft, replacing the aging DC-3s and further modernizing its fleet.

In addition to fleet expansion, Malayan Airways increased its participation in pool jet services by 1963. Alongside its longstanding regional partnerships with British Overseas Airways Corporation (BOAC) and Qantas, the airline entered into agreements with Thai Airways and Cathay Pacific. These collaborations facilitated more direct flights from the airline's hubs in Singapore and Kuala Lumpur to Bangkok and Hong Kong, strengthening its position in regional aviation.

=== Malaysian Airways ===
Logo used 1963 to 1967

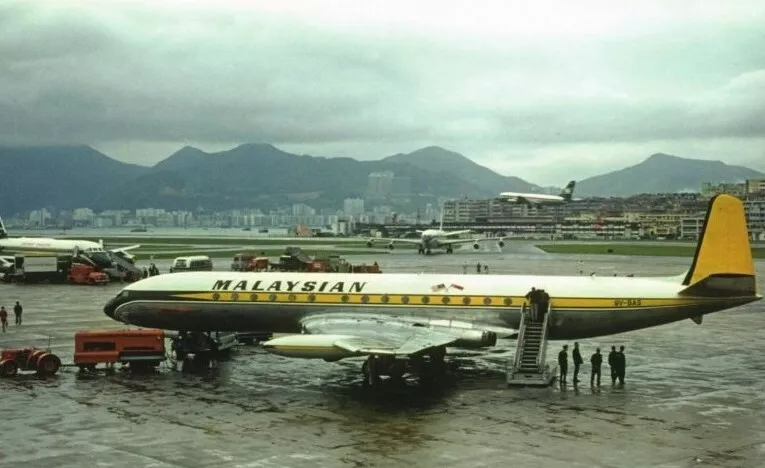
The De Havilland Comet 4 was introduced in 1963 by Malayan Airways, branded as the "Silver Kris Jet".

==== 1963–1965: Transformation and merger to Malaysian Airways ====
Following the establishment of the Federation of Malaysia on 16 September 1963, the need to reflect the new national identity of the Federation in the airline’s name became clear. As a result, on 27 November 1963, Malayan Airways officially rebranded itself as Malaysian Airways Limited. This change symbolised the airline's alignment with the new political landscape, which included Malaya, Singapore, Sabah and Sarawak, marking a new chapter in its history.

The rebranding was not only symbolic but also reflected the growing role of the airline as a national carrier for the Federation of Malaysia. During this period, Malaysian Airways sought to strengthen its regional and domestic networks. To support its expanding operations, the airline added five Fokker F27 Friendship aircraft to its fleet. These additions enabled Malaysian Airways to serve domestic and regional routes more effectively, enhancing both its capacity and efficiency. The airline’s focus during this time was on improving domestic connectivity while continuing to grow its international presence.

In 1965, Malaysian Airways entered into a significant merger with Borneo Airways Limited, further expanding its reach and network. The merger allowed the airline to create a more comprehensive flight network that better served the rapidly growing Malaysian Federation, including the states of Sabah and Sarawak, as well as Singapore.

This merger enabled Malaysian Airways to consolidate its operations and better cater to the demands of air travel in the region. It also marked a key moment in the airline's evolution, as it could now offer more direct flights to the Borneo states and strengthen its connections between the West and East Malaysia. The merger improved the operational efficiency of the airline and allowed it to better serve the population of the Federation by offering a unified national air service.

==== 1965–1966: Challenges and growth after Singapore's expulsion ====
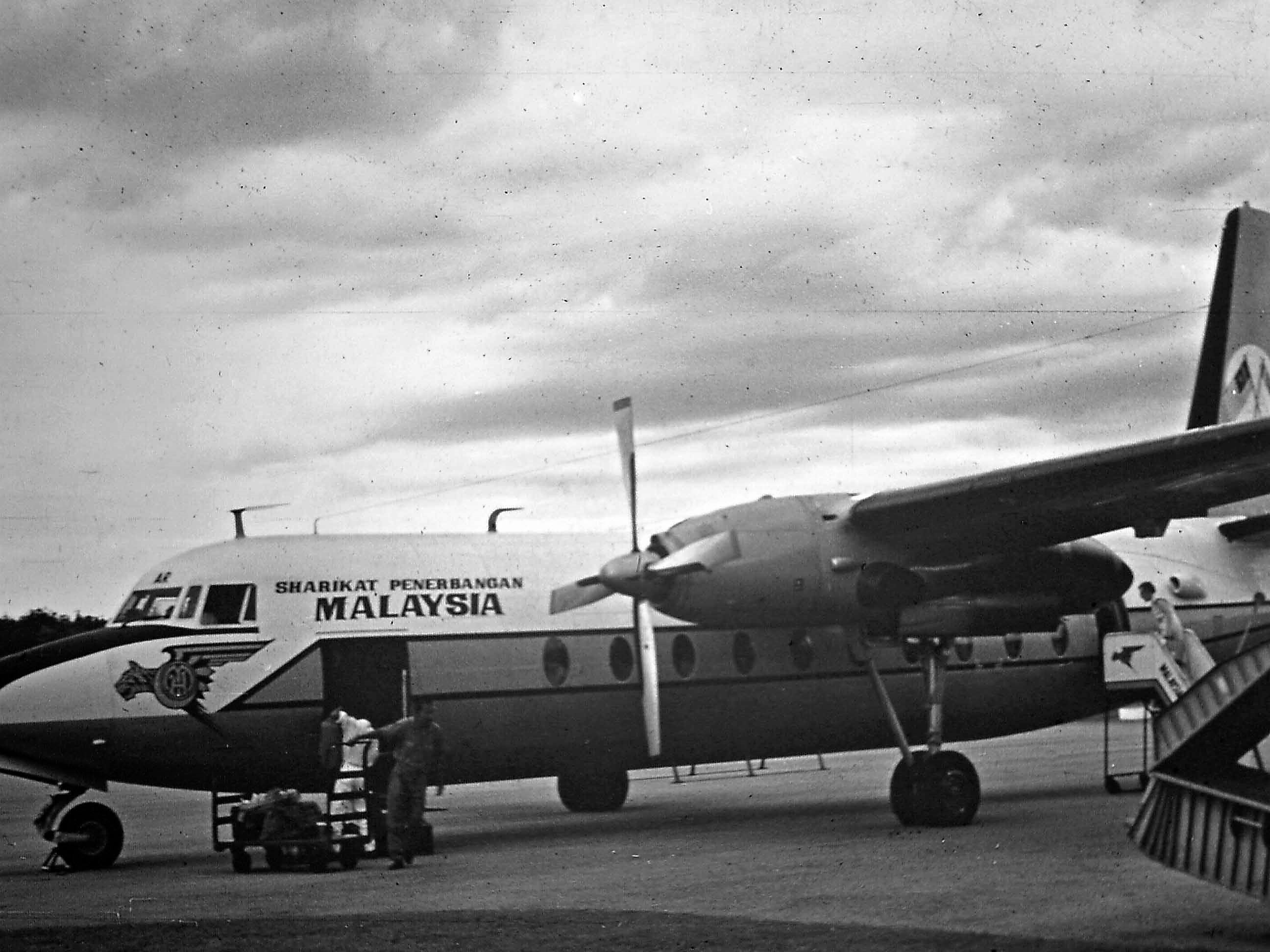
The Malaysian Airways Fokker F27, primarily used for the domestic network

On 9 August 1965, Singapore was separated from the Federation of Malaysia, a development that created significant challenges for Malaysian Airways. This separation led to diverging priorities between the Malaysian and Singaporean governments, particularly in terms of their aviation strategies. While Malaysia focused on developing its domestic air travel network, Singapore aimed to establish itself as a major hub for international aviation.

Despite the challenges that arose from this split, Malaysian Airways continued to expand its operations in the years that followed. In 1966, the airline introduced new routes, increased flight frequencies and added modern Boeing aircraft to its fleet. These developments enhanced the airline's capacity to meet the growing demands for air travel across the Federation. The addition of the Boeing aircraft represented a significant upgrade in the airline’s fleet, ensuring that it could compete more effectively in the evolving regional aviation market.

The airline’s headquarters in Singapore, located on Robinson Road, underscored the strategic importance of Singapore to its operations. However, the separation of Singapore from the Federation influenced the airline, as political tensions between Malaysia and Singapore impacted its development. Despite these political challenges, Malaysian Airways continued to modernize and expand, solidifying its position as a key player in the regional aviation industry.

=== Malaysia-Singapore Airlines ===
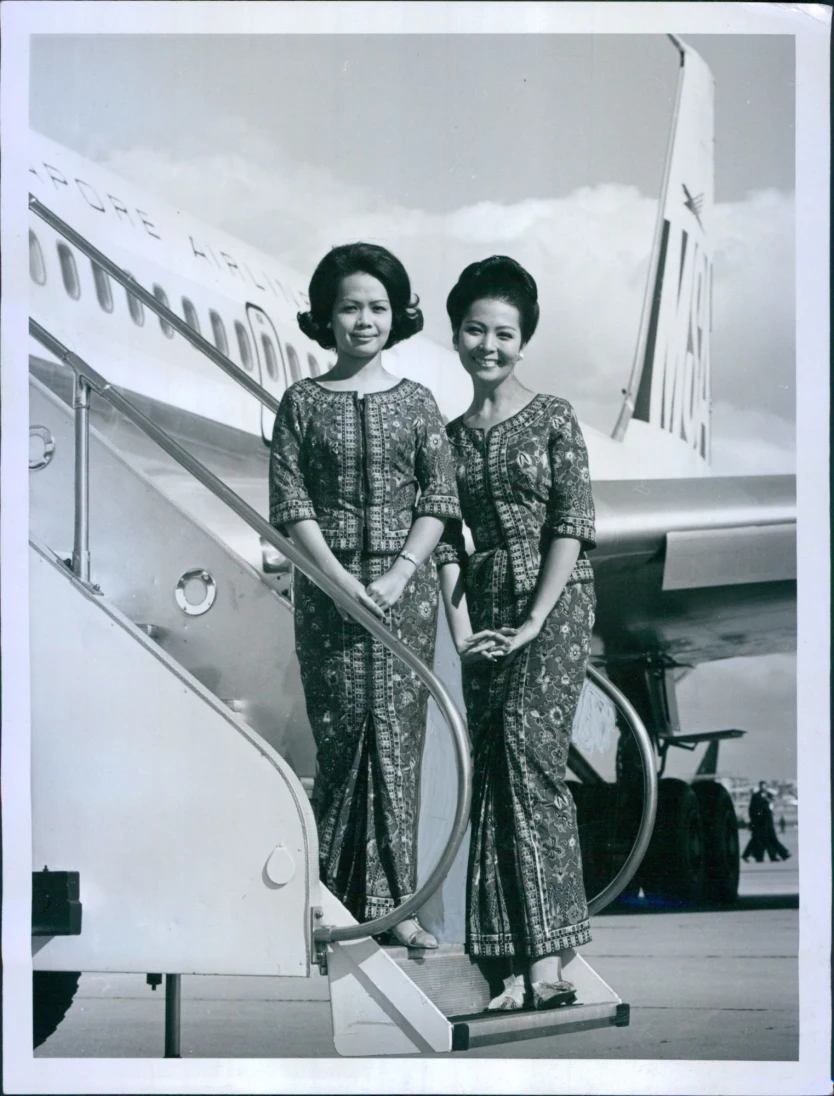
Cabin crew of Malaysia-Singapore Airlines, wearing the kebaya uniform designed by Pierre Balmain in 1968

==== 1966: Rebranding to Malaysia-Singapore Airlines ====
In May 1966, following Singapore’s separation from Malaysia, the airline was officially rebranded as Malaysia-Singapore Airlines (MSA). The name change reflected the new political reality, as the airline became a joint venture between the governments of Malaysia and Singapore. Both countries invested additional capital into the airline, raising their respective ownership stakes to approximately 42.79% each. The remaining shares were held by British Overseas Airways Corporation (BOAC), Qantas, and other stakeholders.

This rebranding signified not only a shift in the political landscape but also in the airline's role in Southeast Asia's growing aviation industry. The formation of MSA represented a closer bilateral collaboration between Malaysia and Singapore, allowing both nations to expand their air travel capabilities and reach new international markets.

==== 1966–1972: Navigating expansion and division ====
Malaysian-Singapore Airlines (MSA) modernised its fleet to meet the growing demand for air travel across Southeast Asia. The airline's acquisition of Boeing 707 and Boeing 737 aircraft allowed it to extend its international reach, replacing the de Havilland Comet ("Silver Kris"). These new aircraft enabled MSA to operate longer flights with larger capacities, catering to the increasing demand for both regional and international air travel.

In 1967, MSA began expanding its network beyond Southeast Asia and Hong Kong, enhancing its international presence. The airline introduced new routes to Taipei, marking its entry further into the East Asian market, and expanded southward to Australia with services to Perth and Sydney. These routes reflected MSA's strategy to diversify its network and tap into emerging markets.

By 1972, MSA's rapid expansion had extended its global reach. The airline became a direct participant in the Kangaroo Route, offering flights between Europe and Australia. From its hub in Singapore, the airline added major European destinations, including London, Rome, Zurich, Frankfurt and Athens, with connections through Bahrain, Colombo and Mumbai. Additionally, MSA began flights to Japan, with services to Tokyo and Osaka, marking a significant milestone in the airline's international expansion.

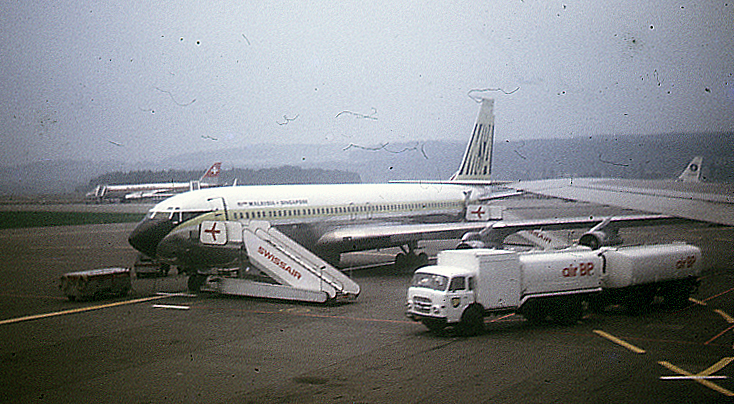
An MSA Boeing 707 at Zurich-Kloten Airport, 1972, showcasing the airline's expansion into long-haul international routes during the early 1970s.

Despite its fleet expansion and increasing demand for air travel, MSA faced significant internal challenges, primarily driven by the diverging aviation priorities of Malaysia and Singapore. Singapore envisioned MSA as a global airline focused on expanding international routes, aiming to position itself as a major player in global aviation. In contrast, Malaysia was more focused on developing domestic connectivity and strengthening regional travel within Southeast Asia. These differing goals created friction between the two governments, which was further compounded by tensions within MSA's management. The two countries struggled to reconcile their contrasting visions, leading to inefficiencies in the airline's operations and hindering its long-term success.

The situation reached a critical point in January 1971 when both governments recognised that MSA’s dual-national structure was no longer viable. In response to these ongoing conflicts, Malaysia and Singapore initiated a restructuring of the airline to better align with their respective aviation strategies. Detailed negotiations followed, focusing on how to divide MSA’s assets, including its fleet, routes and other operational resources. The decision to restructure and split the airline into two separate entities was ultimately seen as the best solution to ensure that each country could pursue its own national aviation goals without further conflict.

In preparation for the dissolution of Malaysia-Singapore Airlines (MSA), the Singaporean division was established on 28 January 1972, under the name Mercury Singapore Airlines. This led to tensions with Malaysia, as both entities shared the MSA acronym. Malaysia threatened legal action unless Singapore paid S$72.7 million in compensation. The dispute was resolved, and on 27 June 1972, the airline was renamed Singapore Airlines (SIA).

==== 1972: End of MSA and creation of Malaysia Airlines and Singapore Airlines ====
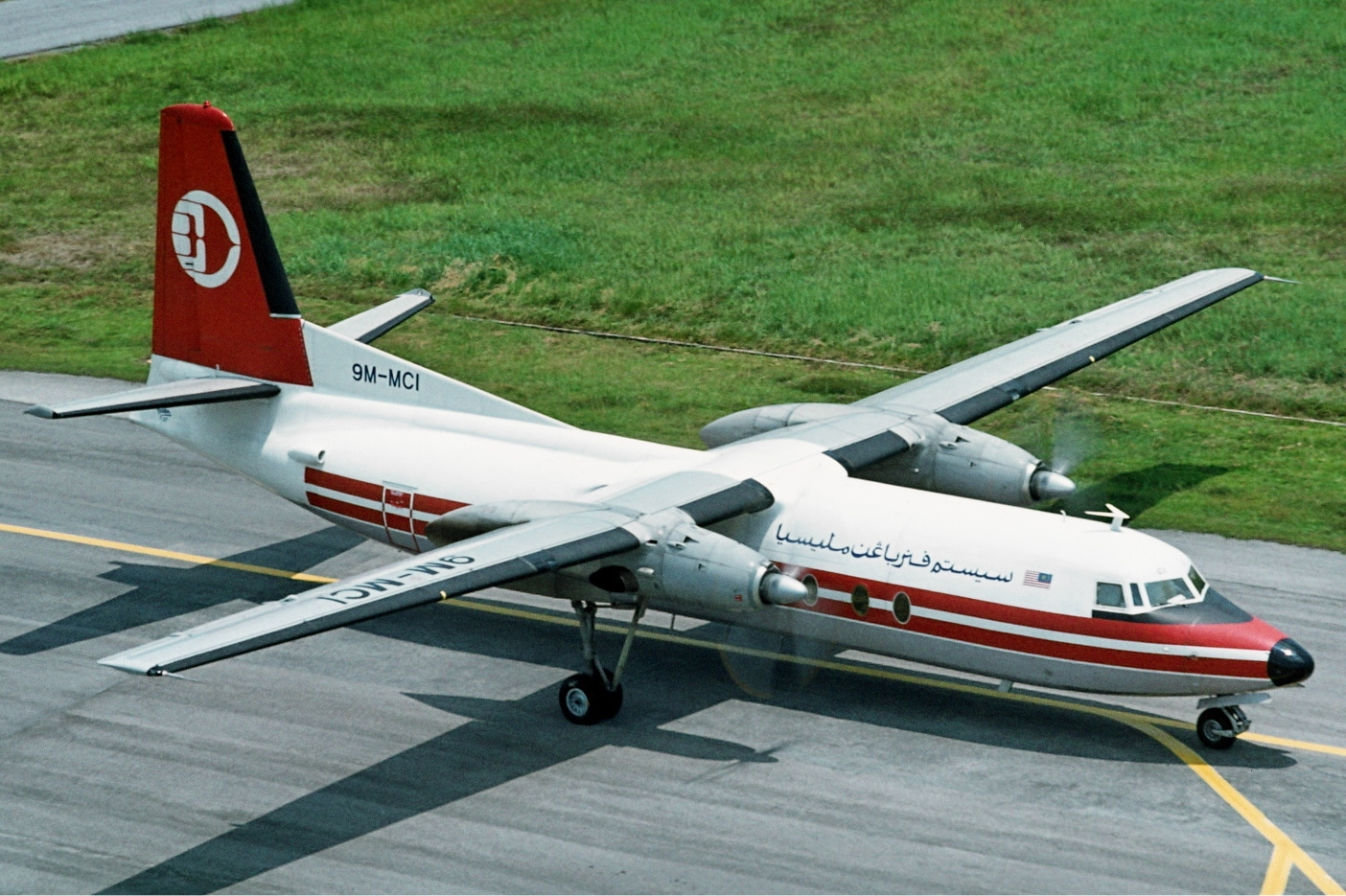
Malaysia Airline System

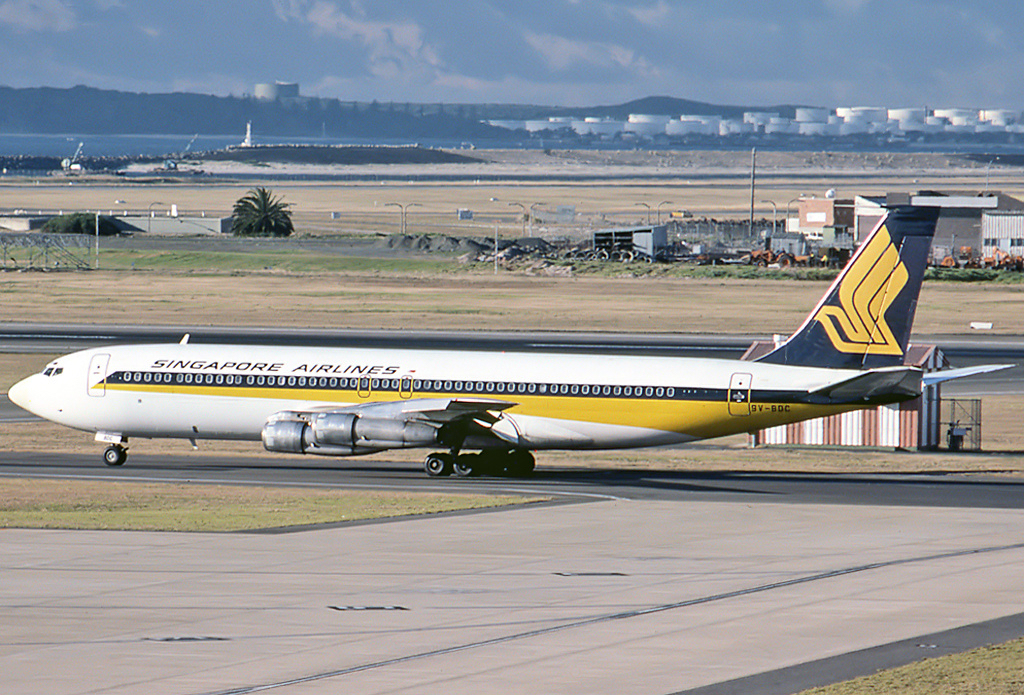
Singapore Airlines

Following the dissoltution of Malaysia-Singapore Airlines in 1972, Singapore Airlines retained all Boeing aircraft for its international operations, while Malaysia Airlines System inherited the Fokker F27 Friendships and Britten-Norman BN-2 Islanders for domestic and regional services

On 1 October 1972, Malaysia-Singapore Airlines (MSA) ceased operations, concluding its six-year tenure. Its assets were divided to establish two new national carriers: Malaysian Airline System (MAS), later rebranded as Malaysia Airlines, and Singapore Airlines (SIA).

Singapore Airlines acquired MSA’s fleet of seven Boeing 707s and five Boeing 737s, enabling it to maintain regional and long-haul international routes. The airline also took over the majority of MSA’s international route network, including 22 cities across 18 countries. Additionally, it inherited key assets such as the headquarters building, hangars maintenance facilities at Paya Lebar Airport, the computer reservation system and most overseas offices—largely because these assets were based in Singapore.

Malaysian Airline System, on the other hand, assumed responsibility for domestic routes within Malaysia and international flights originating from the country. It inherited the remaining fleet of Fokker F27 Friendships and Britten-Norman BN-2 Islanders, along with operational equipment located in Malaysia.

Both MAS and SIA commenced operations on 1 October 1972, following the dissolution of MSA. This reorganisation resulted in two distinct national carriers, each charting its own strategic path while sharing a common foundation in MSA's legacy.

== Former destinations ==
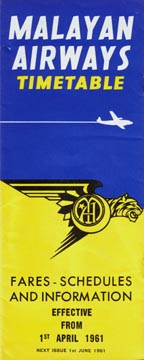
The Malayan Airways timetable cover from 1 April 1961, features the airline's winged tiger logo, which was in use from 1949 until 1966.

The evolution of Malayan Airways into Malaysian Airways and later Malaysia-Singapore Airlines (MSA) was marked by the steady expansion of its route network. Initially, Malayan Airways focused on domestic routes and short-haul flights within Malaya, connecting key cities like Kuala Lumpur, Penang and Singapore. By the 1950s, the airline extended its operations to neighboring regions, offering flights to Jakarta, Medan, Bangkok, Saigon, Kuching and Jesselton.

With its rebranding as Malaysian Airways in the 1960s, the airline continued to grow, the airline continued to expand, incorporating more destinations in East Malaysia following the merger with Borneo Airways. When restructured into Malaysia-Singapore Airlines in 1966, the airline expanded further, introducing flights to South Asian cities like Colombo and Bombay, as well as East Asian destinations such as Tokyo and Taipei. By the early 1970s, MSA's network had grown to include long-haul international routes, with flights to London, Zurich, Frankfurt and Athens, solidifying its position as a major carrier connecting Southeast Asia to Europe and Australia.

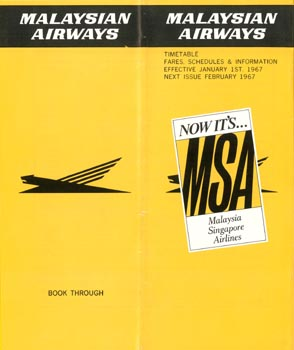
A timetable from 1966, reflecting its rebranding as Malaysia-Singapore Airlines. In January 1966, Malaysian Airways introduced a simplified winged tiger logo, which was later adopted by Malaysia-Singapore Airlines.

=== Malaysia–Singapore Airlines destinations in 1972 ===
- Australia
  - Melbourne – Melbourne Airport
  - Perth – Perth Airport
  - Sydney – Sydney Airport
- Bahrain
  - Manama – Bahrain Airport
- Brunei
  - Brunei Town – Brunei Airport
- (Dominion of Ceylon) Ceylon
  - Colombo – Katunayake Airport
- Greece
  - Athens – Ellinikon Airport
- British Hong Kong
  - Kai Tak Airport
- India
  - Bombay – Santacruz Airport
- Indonesia
  - Denpasar – Tuban Airport
  - Jakarta – Kemayoran Airport
  - Medan – Polonia Airport
- Italy
  - Rome – Rome Fiumicino Airport
- Japan
  - Nagoya – Komaki Airport
  - Osaka – Itami Airport
  - Tokyo – Haneda Airport
- Malaysia
  - Alor Setar – Alor Setar Airport
  - Bario – Bario Airport
  - Belaga – Belaga Airport
  - Bintulu – Bintulu Airport
  - Ipoh – Ipoh Airport
  - Kapit – Kapit Airport
  - Keningau – Keningau Airport
  - Kota Kinabalu – Kota Kinabalu Airport
  - Kota Bharu – Kota Bharu Airport
  - Kuala Lumpur – Subang Airport
  - Kuantan – Kuantan Airport
  - Kuala Terengganu – Kuala Terengganu Airport
  - Kuching – Kuching Airport
  - Kudat – Kudat Airport
  - Lawas – Lawas Airport
  - Labuan – Labuan Airport
  - Lahad Datu – Lahad Datu Airport
  - Limbang – Limbang Airport
  - Long Semado – Long Semado Airport
  - Long Seridan – Long Seridan Airport
  - Malacca – Batu Berendam Airport
  - Marudi – Marudi Airport
  - Miri – Miri Airport
  - Mukah – Mukah Airport
  - Pamol – Pamol Airport
  - Penang – Penang Airport
  - Sandakan – Sandakan Airport
  - Semporna – Semporna Airport
  - Sepulot – Sepulot Airport
  - Sibu – Sibu Airport
  - Simanggang – Simanggang Airport
  - Tawau – Tawau Airport
  - Telupid – Telupid Airport
  - Tomanggong – Tomanggong Airport
- Philippines
  - Manila – Manila Airport
- Singapore – Paya Lebar Airport
- Switzerland
  - Zurich – Zurich Airport
- Taiwan
  - Taipei – Songshan Airport
- Thailand
  - Bangkok – Bangkok Airport
- United Kingdom
  - London – Heathrow Airport
- South Vietnam
  - Saigon – Tan Son Nhut Airport
- West Germany
  - Frankfurt – Frankfurt Airport

== Fleet ==
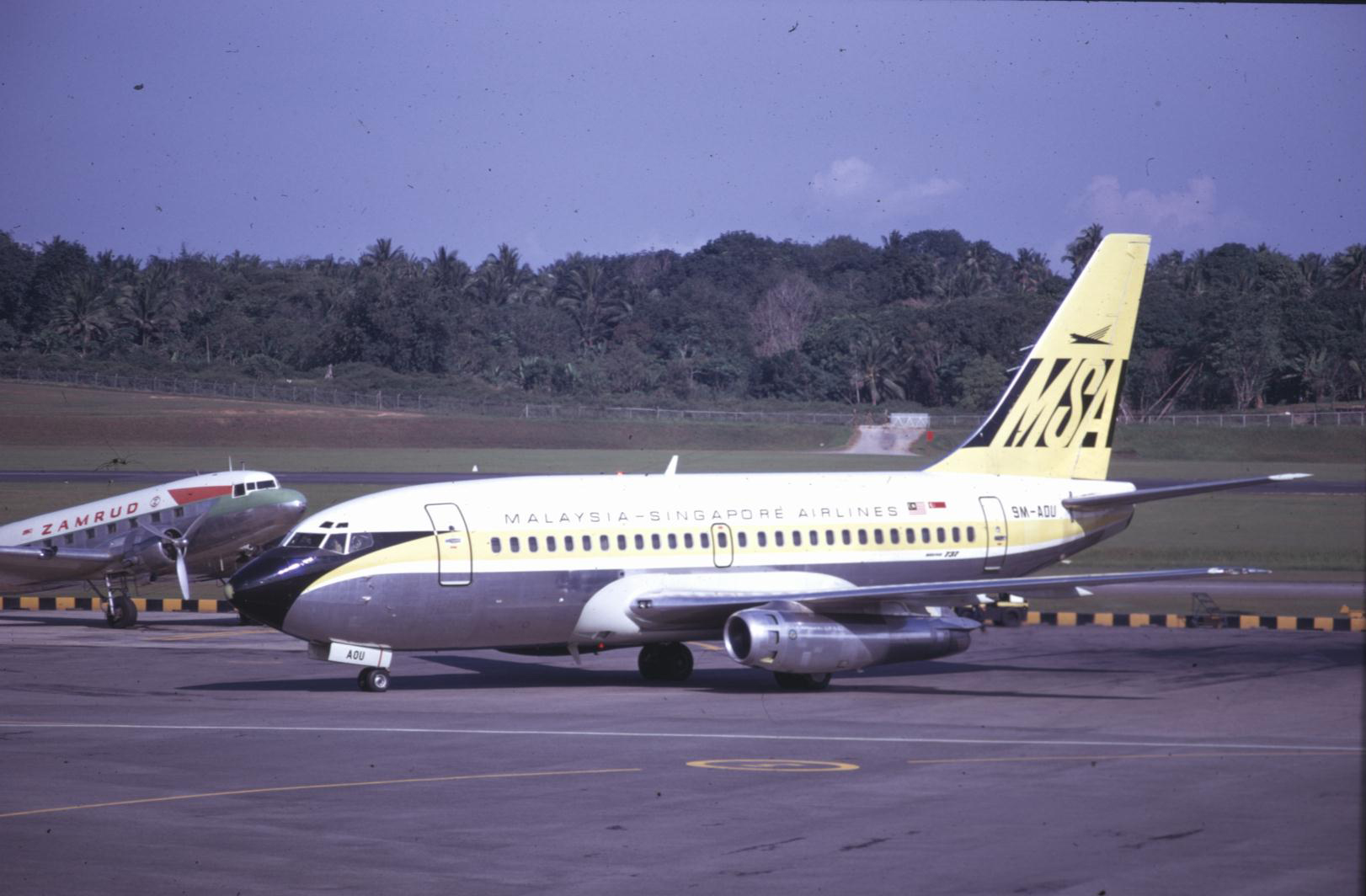
A Malaysia-Singapore Airlines Boeing 737 at Singapore–Paya Lebar Airport, photographed in February 1969

The airline's fleet evolved significantly to meet the increasing demands of regional and international air travel. During the Malayan Airways era, smaller aircraft like the de Havilland DH.89 Dragon Rapide were initially used for domestic and short-haul flights. The introduction of the Douglas DC-3 improved regional connectivity and helped accommodate growing passenger numbers. Over time, these were gradually replaced by larger models, including the Vickers Viscount and Douglas DC-4, which enabled the airline to operate longer routes with higher passenger capacity.

In 1962, Malaysian Airways entered the jet age with the acquisition of the de Havilland Comet 4, known as the "Silver Kris".This marked the airline's transition to jet-powered services, enhancing its capabilities for faster and more efficient long-distance flights.

With the restructuring into Malaysia-Singapore Airlines (MSA) in 1966, the fleet saw further modernisation, including the addition of Boeing 707 and Boeing 737 aircraft for international services. Meanwhile, the Fokker F27 Friendship was used for domestic and regional operations, solidifying the airline's position as a key player in both regional and long-haul air travel.

Malayan Airways, Malaysian Airways and Malaysia–Singapore Airlines historical fleet
Aircraft	Introduced	Retired	Notes
Airspeed Consul	1947	1951	
Boeing 707-320	1967	1980-1982	Transferred to Singapore Airlines.
Boeing 737-100	1969	1980	Transferred to Singapore Airlines.
Britten-Norman BN-2 Islander	1968	1972	Transferred to Malaysian Airline System.
de Havilland Canada DHC-2 Beaver	1952	1960	Operated by Federation Air Service prior to merger with Malayan Airways.
de Havilland DH.89A Dragon Rapide	1949	1958	
de Havilland DH.106 Comet 4	1962	1969	Operated by Malaysian Airways prior to merger with Borneo Airways.
Douglas DC-3	1947	1968	Operated by Malaysian Airways and Borneo Airways prior to merger.
Douglas DC-4	1958	1960	
Fokker F27 Friendship	1963	1972	Transferred to Malaysian Airline System.
Lockheed L-1049 Super Constellation	1960	1960	
Scottish Aviation Twin Pioneer	1959	1962	Operated by Borneo Airways prior to merger with Malaysian Airways.
Vickers Viscount	1959	1962	

== Corporate affairs ==
In the 1960s, Malaysian Airways was based at Raffles Place, Singapore. By 1971, its headquarters were relocated to the MSA Building on Robinson Road, Singapore, which was later renamed the SIA Building.

== Incidents ==
Malaysian Airways (MAL) and Malaysia-Singapore Airlines (MSA) experienced a total of six hull-loss accidents during their operations, all of which resulted in no fatalities:

- On 22 March 1964, Malaysian Airways Flight 511, operated by a de Havilland Comet 4 (G-APDH) on lease from BOAC, crashed during landing at Singapore's Paya Lebar Airport upon arriving from Bangkok via Kuala Lumpur. The aircraft bounced during landing and the starboard landing gear leg, weakened by fatigue, failed, causing the plane to settle back onto the runway and sustain substantial damage, though all 68 occupants survived.
- On 30 January 1967, a Douglas DC-3 (9M-AMU) operated by Malaysia-Singapore Airlines crashed during landing at Lutong Airport in Miri, following a flight from Sibu. The aircraft skidded into a ditch and all 28 occupants survived. The aircraft was written off due to damage.
- On 5 March 1967, a Scottish Aviation Twin Pioneer (9M-ANO) operated by Malaysia-Singapore Airlines was damaged beyond repair during landing at Limbang Airport, Malaysia. The incident resulted in one injury among the 16 occupants.
- On 17 May 1967, a Scottish Aviation Twin Pioneer (9M-ANC) operated by Malaysia-Singapore Airlines crashed during takeoff from Limbang Airport, Malaysia. The aircraft was destroyed, but no fatalities were reported among the occupants.
- On 5 December 1969, a Britten-Norman BN-2 Islander (9M-APE) operated by Malaysia-Singapore Airlines was substantially damaged during landing at Bario Airport, Malaysia.
- On 23 November 1971, a Fokker F-27 Friendship (9V-BCU) operated by Malaysia-Singapore Airlines was involved in a training accident at Kota Kinabalu Airport, Malaysia. During a training flight, a simulated engine failure on the No. 2 engine led to an attempted abort, but the aircraft overshot the runway and ended up on its belly at the end of runway 20.

== See also ==
- Borneo Airways
- Federation Air Service
- History of Malaysia Airlines
- History of Singapore Airlines
