= Kuala Lumpur International Airport (disambiguation) =

Kuala Lumpur International Airport may refer to:

- Kuala Lumpur International Airport, serving Kuala Lumpur for domestic and international flights since 1998
- Sultan Abdul Aziz Shah Airport, formerly serving Kuala Lumpur for international flights from 1965 to 1998, now serving turboprop only
- Simpang Airport, formerly serving Kuala Lumpur for international flights from 1952 to 1965, now in use by the Royal Malaysian Air Force
