= Borneo Airways Limited =

Flag carrier of British Borneo (1957–1965)

Borneo Airways Limited Sharikat Penerbangan Borneo
| IATA | ICAO | Call sign |
|---|---|---|
| AB | — | BORNEO |
- Founded: 1949 (As Sabah Airways Ltd.); 1957 (As Borneo Airways Ltd.)
- Ceased operations: 1 April 1965 (incorporated into Malaysian Airways)
- Hubs: Sandakan Aerodrome (Before 1955); Labuan Airport
- Focus cities: Jesselton Airport
- Fleet size: 5
- Destinations: 23
- Parent company: British Borneo Governments (51%); BOAC and Malayan Airways (49%)
- Headquarters: Sandakan, North Borneo (1953); Labuan, North Borneo (1955); Jesselton, North Borneo (1962)
- Key people: L.C. Harding (former chairman, 1957-1959); D.E.M. Fiennes (former chairman, 1959-1964); Kwang Tong Ming (former chairman, 1964-1965)

Borneo Airways Limited also known as Borneo Airways (Malay: Sharikat Penerbangan Borneo), was the flag carrier and the principal domestic airline in British Borneo (later constituting the Malaysian states of Sabah and Sarawak and the country of Brunei Darussalam) based in Labuan between 1957 until 1 April 1965 when it merged with its Malaysian Airways.

The airline was originally founded in 1949 as Sabah Airways Limited. (SAL), to operate an air route between Sandakan and Jesselton (present-day Kota Kinabalu). Acting as a subsidiary of Malayan Airways, the airline operated scheduled passenger service, as well as cargo, mail and chartered services primarily on the three British Borneo (and the subsequent corresponding East Malaysian and Brunei) territories.

AirBorneo (formerly MASwings), state-owned regional airline owned by the Sarawak Government, may be regarded as a contemporary successor to Borneo Airways, given its shared operational lineage and its similar role as an inter-Borneo air carrier.

== History ==
=== 1949–1957: Sabah Airways Ltd. ===
Borneo Airways traced its history to Sabah Airways Ltd. (SAL), formed by Mansfield and Company Limited and established by the Straits Steamship Company and the government of British North Borneo. A subsidiary of Malayan Airways, the airline was launched in order to provide internal feeder service and rural flights in the territory.

The proving flights started in May 1953 followed by a scheduled twice weekly flights in June 1953, linking Jesselton and Sandakan via Kudat, Ranau and Keningau. The operation later continued to Tawau in September 1953 and Lahad Datu in 1954.

By 1955, the network was broadened into the State of Brunei and the Colony of Sarawak, with the airline acquiring the third de Havilland Dragon Rapide essential for its expansion. The base was also being shifted to Labuan Airport, replacing Sandakan Aerodrome, due to its more central geographical location for the routes.

=== 1957–1965: Borneo Airways Ltd. ===
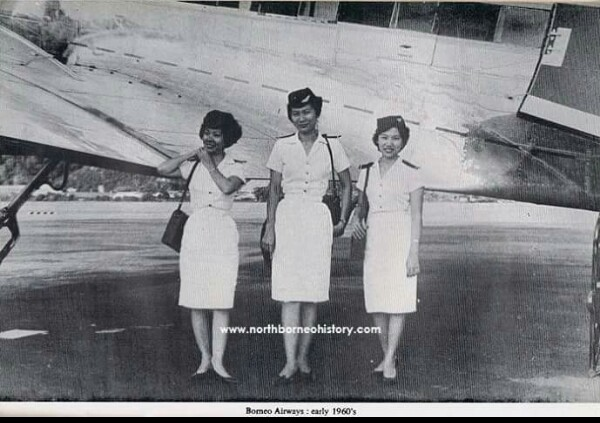
Borneo Airways flight attendants in front of a Douglas DC-3 aircraft

In 1957, the North Borneo Government with the government of Sarawak and Brunei established a new company in association of British Overseas Airways Corporation and Malayan Airways to form Borneo Airways, a successor of Sabah Airways. The company raised its capital amount to $580,000 of which 51% of its shares were jointly owned by the British Borneo Government. Conversely, the British Borneo Governments also possessed a minority stake on the Malayan Airways Limited.

The new company was registered in Kuching, Sarawak; while its main operating & maintenance base, hangar and company headquarter remained in Labuan. The company was delegated the task to operate and further developing the internal air services between the three territories. By 1958, all of the former Sabah Airways assets were officially shifted into Borneo Airways.

The airline acquired 2 new Scottish Aviation Twin Pioneer in April 1958, originally purchased jointly by the Governments of Sarawak, Brunei and North Borneo in January 1956. The aircraft is able to carry 16 passengers and was used to replace the feeder flights operated by de Havilland Dragon Rapide. The planes bearing the North Borneo aircraft registration codes VR-OAE and VR-OAF are being featured with an updated visual elements: These include an updated color scheme of royal blue and white, together with a new emblem for Borneo Airways Ltd. The emblem comprises the crests of the three Borneo Governments positioned over a set of white wings.

During its first year of operation in 1957/1958, the airline projected a loss of $174,000 after recorded an operating revenue of $1,150,848 on the same year. By 1960, it had registered 32,782 passengers for the year 1959/1960, a 35% growth compared to the previous year. During the same period, Borneo Airways flew 76 tonnes of mail and recorded 187 tonnes of cargo. The passenger growth continued the following year, registering 46,183 passengers in 1961, marking a 25% increase.

The company received its first DC-3 leased from Malayan Airways on 31 August 1962 for its high demand trunk routes. The aircraft was specially modified to increase the seat capacity from 28 to 30 seats and was equipped a refrigerator for its light meal and refreshment service during flight. The inaugural flight for the DC-3 service was commenced on 1 September 1962 between Tawau-Lahad Datu-Sandakan-Jesselton; by 6 September 1962, the flight was extended southbound to include Brunei Town (present-day Bandar Seri Begawan) and Bintulu under a twice-weekly service. 3 local air hostess were also trained in Labuan to serve the route.

In 1963, Borneo Airways received another 30-seater DC-3 to accommodate the increasing passenger traffic growth from the main urban and commercial areas of the British Borneo Territories. By 1964, the operating revenue grew to $3,675,275, with a profit of $33,404. The company had also commenced the recruitment of local Bornean male for its pilot training program.

The airline entered an interline agreement with Malayan Airways in 1961. Based on this partnership, the Malayan Airways route to and from Singapore was streamlined with the local Borneo Airways schedule. This was done in order to provide practical transfer time for the passengers connecting on multiple destinations via the two carriers.

=== 1963–1965: Merger with Malaysian Airways ===
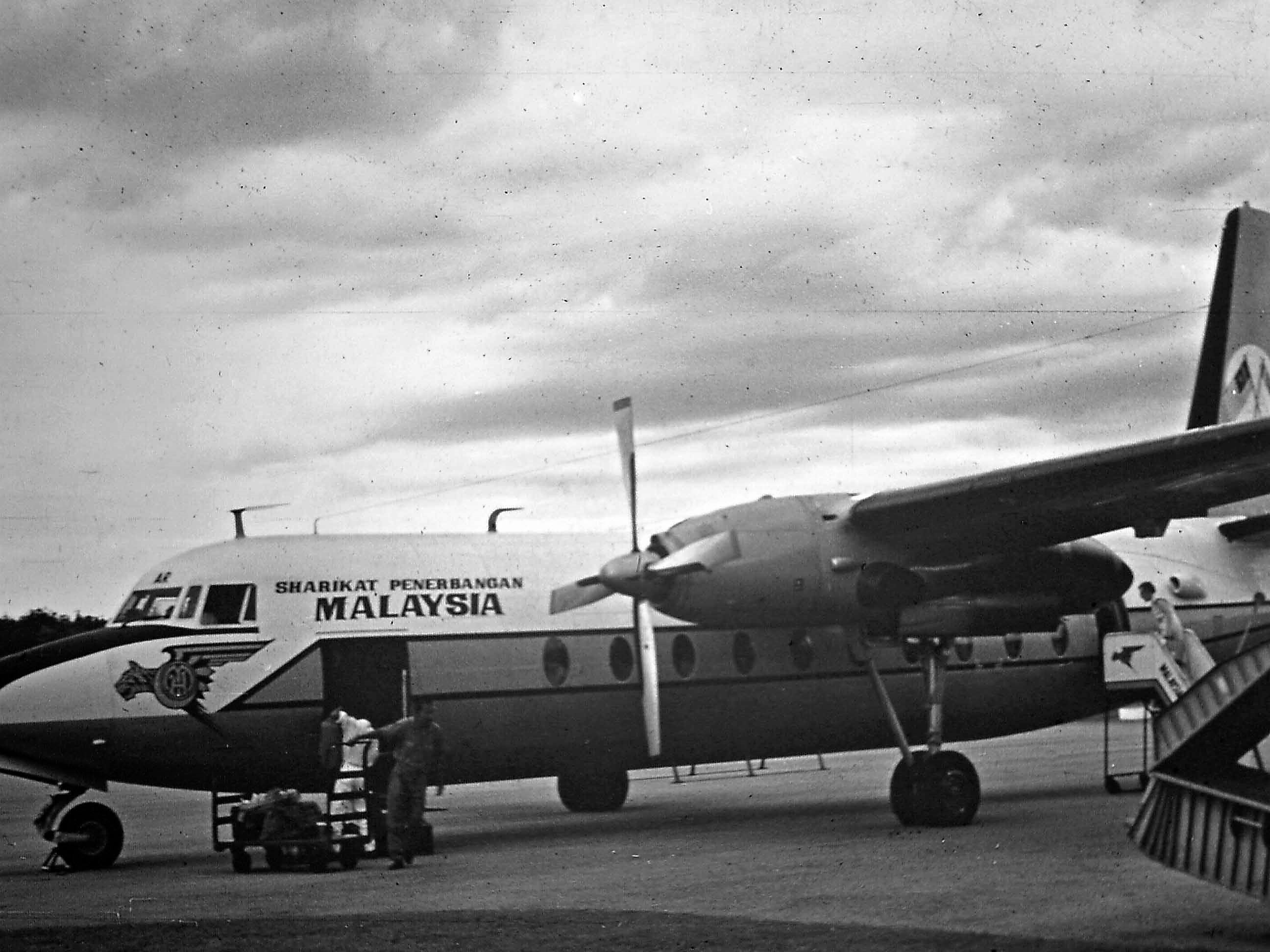
A Malaysian Airways Fokker F27, similar to the aircraft that had been stationed in East Malaysia in 1965. The aircraft was introduced in order to replace the aging DC-3 of its Borneo Airways predecessor.

The possibility of unification between Malayan with Borneo Airways to form Malaysian Airways was purposed as early as April 1963 by Captain R.P Mollard, the General Manager of Malayan Airways, anticipating of the Formation of Malaysia originally scheduled on 31 August 1963. In November 1963, Malayan Airways was effectively renamed as Malaysian Airways Limited.

In April 1964, the Transport Minister of Malaysia, Tan Sri Haji Sardon has mooted the prospect of merger between Malaysian Airways and Borneo Airways. The aim was to provide an efficient service under a single company and administration, as well as a better integration of the newborn country. An increased air connectivity between East and West Malaysia, together with a uniform rates resulting a reduction of fares within the inter-Borneo flights were also expected following the consolidation.

It was officially incorporated by then Malaysian Airways (later known as Malaysia-Singapore Airlines, precursor of present-day Singapore Airlines and Malaysia Airlines) on 1 April 1965. At the time of the takeover, Borneo Airways fleet consisted of 3 Douglas C-47 Dakota and 2 Scottish Aviation Twin Pioneer aircraft.

Upon the inception, Malaysian Airways stationed 2 40-seater Fokker F27 Friendship to be based in East Malaysia to replace the C-47 aircraft, and the thinner frontier routes operated by Twin Pioneer aircraft were rebranded from "Ulu Air Service" to "Rural Air Service" under Malaysian Airways.

== Fleet ==
Borneo Airways fleet
| Aircraft | Total | Passengers | Routes | Introduced | Retired | Replacement | Notes |
|---|---|---|---|---|---|---|---|
| de Havilland Dragon Rapide | 3 | 9 | All (Prior to 1958); Regional (1958-1961) | 1953 (Under Sabah Airways) | 1961 | Scottish Aviation Twin Pioneer | |
| Douglas C-47 Dakota | 4 | 30 | Mainline | 1958 | 1971 (Under Malaysia-Singapore Airlines) | Fokker F27 Friendship (By Malaysian Airways, 1965) | All Borneo Airways aircraft were re-registered from British North Borneo aircraft registration VR-Oxx to Malaysian Registration 9M-Axx in 1964.; The fleet were transferred into Malaysian Airways following the merger on 1 April 1965. |
| Scottish Aviation Twin Pioneer | 3 | 16 | Regional (Operated as Ulu Air Service) | 1958 | 1968 (Under Malaysia-Singapore Airlines) | Britten-Norman BN-2 Islander (By Malaysia-Singapore Airlines, 1968) | All Borneo Airways aircraft were re-registered from British North Borneo aircraft registration VR-Oxx to Malaysian Registration 9M-Axx in 1964.; The fleet were transferred into Malaysian Airways following the merger on 1 April 1965. |

== Destinations ==
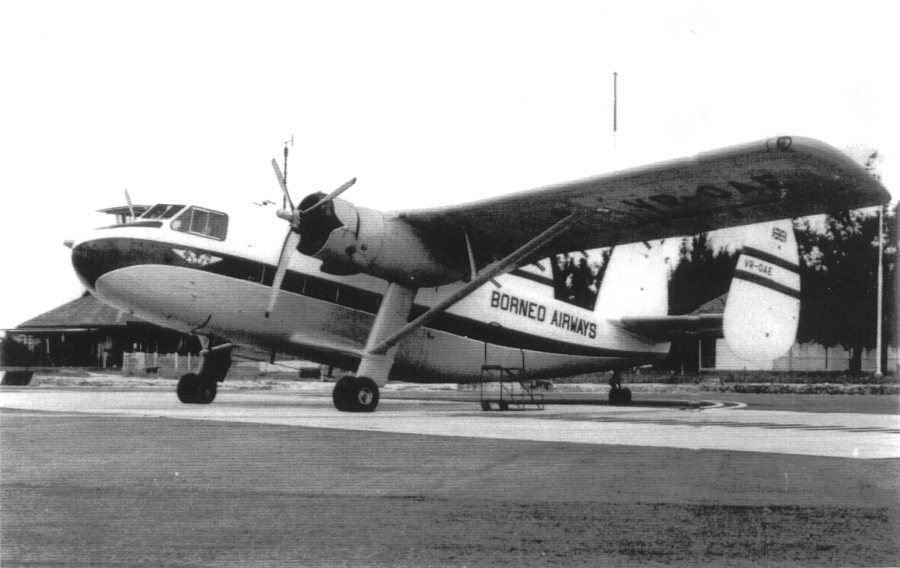
A Borneo Airways Scottish Aviation Twin Pioneer

Borneo Airways historically operated scheduled services to the following destinations. Towns served by C-47 are noted in bold; destinations marked with an asterisk (*) no longer have scheduled passenger air service.

- **Brunei**
  - **Brunei Town** (present-day Bandar Seri Begawan)
  - Anduki* (Seria)
- **North Borneo/Sabah**
  - **Jesselton** (present-day Kota Kinabalu)
  - Kudat
  - **Labuan** - **Base**
  - **Lahad Datu**
  - Sapulut*
  - Ranau*
  - **Sandakan**
  - Semporna*
  - **Tawau**
- **Sarawak**
  - Bario
  - Belaga*
  - **Bintulu**
  - Kapit*
  - **Kuching**
  - Lawas
  - Limbang
  - Long Akah
  - Long Semado*
  - **Lutong** (Miri)
  - Marudi
  - Mukah
  - **Sibu**
  - Simanggang* (present-day Sri Aman Division)

== Accidents and incidents ==
Borneo Airways had several incidents and accidents over its history, with 2 hull loss although none has resulted any loss of life during its operation.

- 27 March 1959 - a Borneo Airways de Havilland Dragon Rapide (VR-OAB) crashed in Lahad Datu Airport, the aircraft was likely withdrawn from service after the incident.
- 14 May 1958 - a Twin Pioneer aircraft (VR-OAC), damaged due to nose-over landing in Brunei Airport.
- 21 December 1961 - A Borneo Airways operated Scottish Aviation Twin Pioneer (VR-OAC) stalled and crashed at Jesselton Point, 5 km from the runway. All five occupants on the aircraft (one pilot and four passengers) were injured in the accident. The aircraft was later written-off from service.
- 7 September 1963 - a Scottish Aviation Twin Pioneer (VR-OAE) from Mukah to Sibu was damaged beyond repair after crash landing in a swamp after take-off. There were 14 occupants in the aircraft, with a passenger was slightly injured in the incident.
- 1 January 1964 - a Douglas C-47 Dakota aircraft en route to Tawau from Jesselton suffered power loss on one of its engines during flight. The plane was forced to return to Jesselton. There were no injuries amongst the 16 passengers and 3 crew members.
- 5 May 1964 - a Borneo Airways flight operated by a Douglas C-47 Dakota aircraft from Kuching to Sibu burst one of its front tires upon landing. The aircraft was forced to an immediate stop in the middle of the runway. None of the 32 passengers were hurt.

== See also ==
- Federation Air Service, another Malayan Airways subsidiary of the same era

== Bibliography ==
- Story of The Sarawak Steamship Company, Vincent H.K.Foo and Chai Foh Chin, 2001, pp. 103–105.
