= Sultan Azlan Shah Airport =

Airport in Kinta, Perak, Malaysia

Sultan Azlan Shah Airport Lapangan Terbang Sultan Azlan Shah
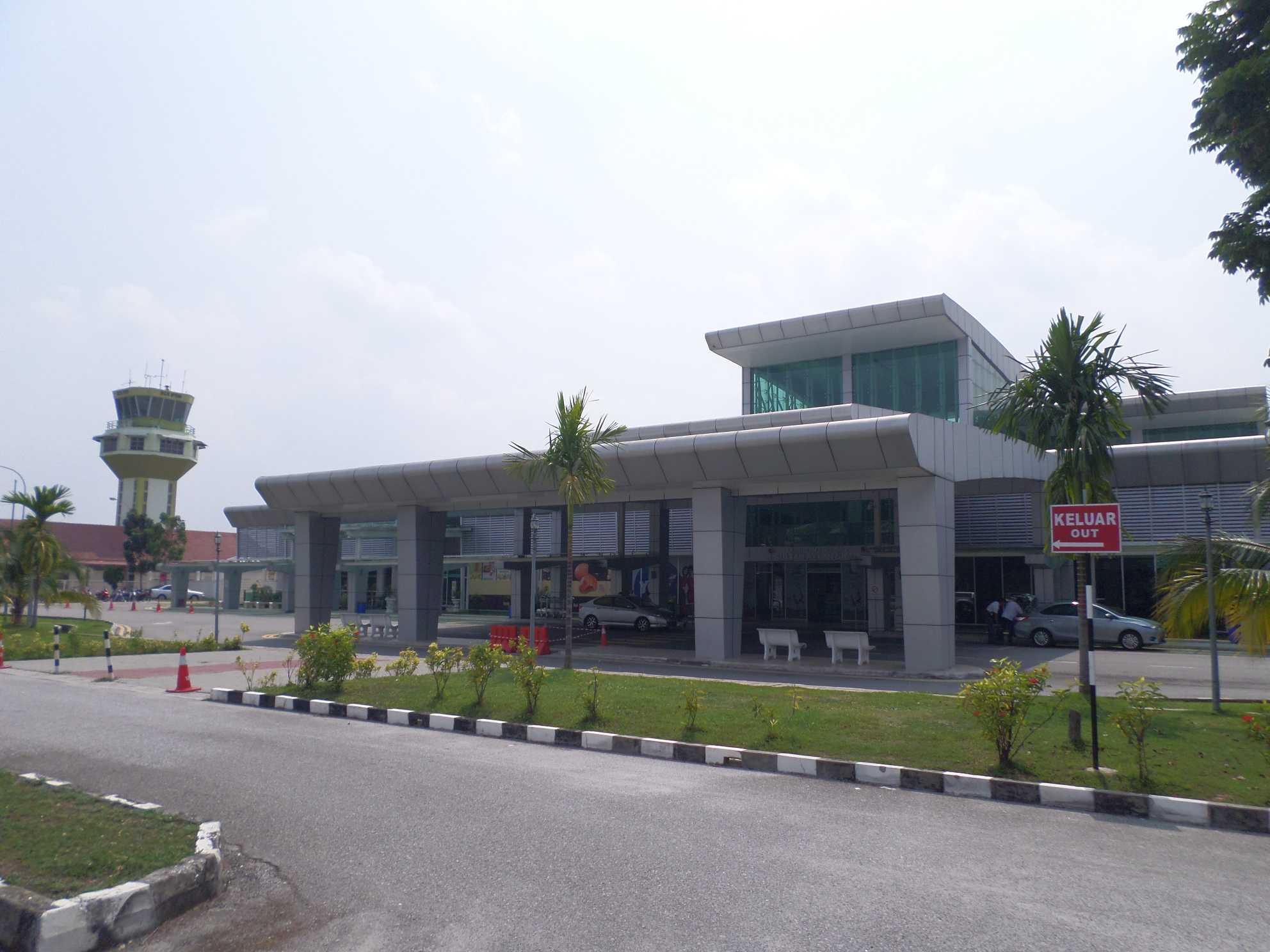
- IATA: IPH; ICAO: WMKI

Summary
- Airport type: Public
- Owner: Khazanah Nasional
- Operator: Malaysia Airports Holdings Berhad (MAHB)
- Serves: Ipoh and southern Perak, Malaysia
- Location: Ipoh, Perak, Malaysia
- Time zone: MST (UTC+08:00)
- Elevation AMSL: 130 ft (40 m)
- Coordinates: 04°34′09″N 101°05′35″E

Maps
- Perak State in Malaysia

- Location in Ipoh, Perak, Peninsular Malaysia IPH/WMKI (Peninsular Malaysia) IPH/WMKI (Malaysia) IPH/WMKI (Southeast Asia) IPH/WMKI (Asia)

Runways
Direction	Length		Surface
Direction	m	ft	Surface
04/22	2,000	6,562	Asphalt

Statistics (2023)
- Passenger: 517,160 (▲54.8%)
- Airfreight (tonnes): 0 ()
- Aircraft movements: 25,181 (▼1.6%)
- Source: MAHB Airport Statistics 2023; AIP Malaysia

Sultan Azlan Shah Airport (IATA: IPH, ICAO: WMKI) is an airport serving the city of Ipoh in the Malaysian state of Perak. Situated approximately 6 kilometres (3.7 mi) from the city center, it ranks as the 15th busiest airport in Malaysia.

== History ==
=== History and Inception ===
Ipoh Airport was originally planned to be developed in 1983 under the Fourth Malaysia Plan. During that period, the airport could only accommodate smaller aircraft such as the Fokker models. In response to rising air travel demand, a new terminal was proposed in late 1988, with an allocated budget of RM35 million. This expansion included runway extensions to support larger Boeing 737 aircraft. The construction of these improvements was completed in August 1989, with the terminal expected to be operational by mid-September of that year.

=== Decline in Passenger Demand ===
During its peak, Ipoh Airport served a significant number of passengers, partly due to Malaysia Airlines operating services to and from the city. However, following the opening of the North-South Expressway, many travelers opted for alternative transportation methods, which offered more cost-effective options compared to air travel. Consequently, Malaysia Airlines and later AirAsia ceased their services from the airport. Additionally, with the introduction of electric train services that provided direct links to Kuala Lumpur, Malaysia Airports began to re-evaluate the financial sustainability of Ipoh Airport.

=== Revitalisation and Upgrades ===
To revitalise the airport, a new terminal building was constructed along with an extended runway at a cost of RM45 million. The runway was lengthened to 2,000 metres (6,600 ft) to allow operations by larger aircraft such as the Boeing 737 and Airbus A320 families. The new terminal featured expanded departure and arrival halls, full air-conditioning and an increased capacity to handle a larger volume of passengers.

Despite these upgrades, the runway was initially restricted to turboprop aircraft due to the emergence of potholes shortly after construction. Although the issue was resolved, similar runway maintenance issues recurred before being permanently addressed, allowing the runway to be used daily by various aircraft.

=== Recent Services and Operations ===
In September 2014, Firefly resumed operations at Ipoh Airport with a route to Singapore, followed by Malindo Air (now Batik Air Malaysia) in October 2014, which introduced routes to Subang, Johor Bahru and Medan, Indonesia. Srivijaya Air also launched a route to Medan in November 2014, expanding the airport’s connectivity within the region.

In May 2015, Tigerair, now Scoot, began services to Ipoh, further enhancing its international reach. AirAsia resumed its Johor Bahru-Ipoh service in October 2018 and added a new routes to Singapore in December 2018 and Langkawi in 2020. These additions strengthened Ipoh Airport’s position as a growing regional airport, offering more options for both domestic and international travel.

In May 2025, Airasia suspended the International route from Ipoh to Singapore, leaving Singaporean airlines company Scoot being the sole airlines company operating the Ipoh - Singapore route. The local state government has expressed strong dissatisfaction over this decision, citing that it might negatively impact tourism between the two countries.

=== Future Growth and Expansion Plans ===
The Malaysian Government has explored relocation options for Ipoh Airport, constrained by surrounding residential areas that limit further expansion. Potential sites considered include areas farther from the city center, such as Seri Iskandar or Batang Padang near Tapah, though no concrete actions have been implemented. Another proposal suggested utilizing Ipoh as a feeder airport, as it faces challenges competing with larger airports in Penang and Kuala Lumpur. While several airlines have expressed interest in adding routes to Ipoh, only Tigerair (now Scoot) has established operations. Airlines from China and Indonesia have also indicated interest in future services.

In March 2017, the Perak state government announced plans to expand the terminal to increase passenger capacity. Additional upgrades, including an extension of the runway from 2 to 2.5 kilometres (1.2 to 1.6 mi), were anticipated the following year to better support larger aircraft and enhance connectivity. These improvements are aimed at making Ipoh Airport more competitive as a regional hub while addressing the space limitations of its current location.

== Airlines and destinations ==
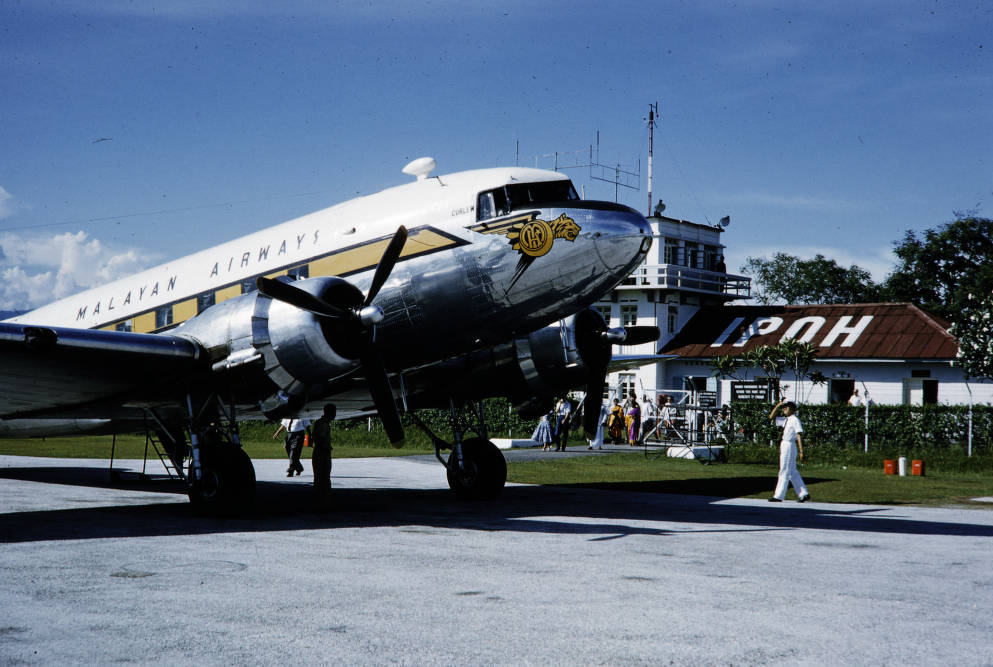
A Malayan Airways in Ipoh

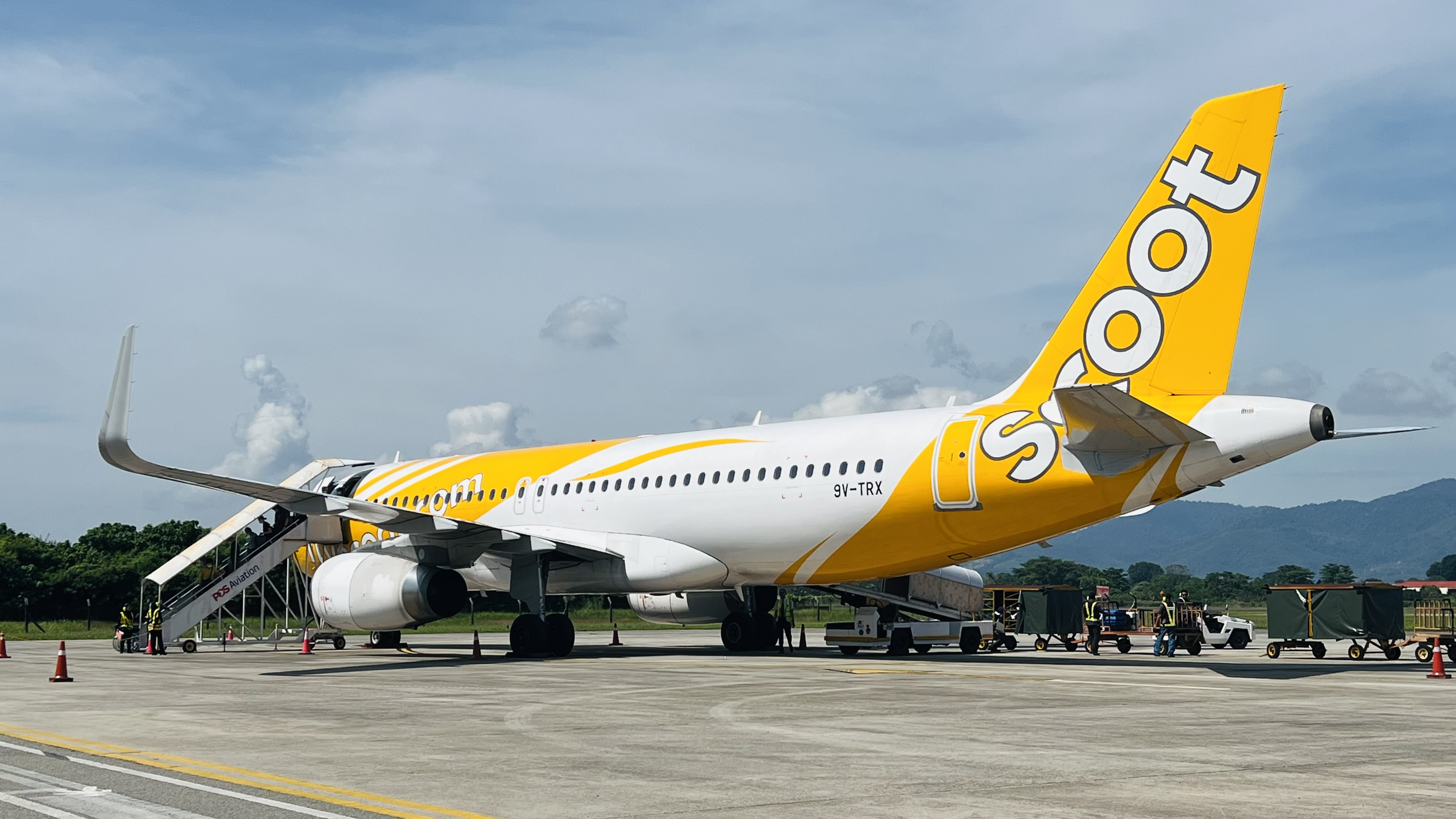
Scoot Airbus A320 at Ipoh Airport, servicing the Singapore-Ipoh route

=== Passenger ===
Airlines	Destinations
AirAsia	Johor Bahru
Scoot	Singapore

== Statistics ==
Annual passenger numbers and aircraft statistics
Year	Passengers handled	Passenger % change	Cargo (tonnes)	Cargo % change	Aircraft movements	Aircraft % change
2003	115,286	Steady	498	Steady	1,572	11.88
2004	103,123	▼10.6	735	▲47.6	1,402	▼10.84
2005	74,451	▼27.8	437	▼40.5	1,145	▼18.31
2006	64,711	▼13.1	357	▼18.3	954	▼16.72
2007	814	▼98.8	10	▼97.2	12	▼98.73
2008	5,376	▲560.4	0	▼100	183	▲14252
2009	21,937	▲308.0	0	Steady	384	▲109.85
2010	48,508	▲121.1	0	Steady	844	▲119.84
2011	71,169	▲46.7	0	Steady	1,536	▲82.07
2012	73,354	▲3.1	34	▲167.4	1,515	▼1.49
2013	74,320	▲1.3	403	▲1091.4	1,464	▼3.45
2014	98,768	▲32.9	296	▼26.6	17,682	▲1107.888
2015	222,606	▲125.4	318	▲7.2	19,956	▲12.98
2016	269,696	▲21.2	178	▼44.1	14,137	▼29.28
2017	274,146	▲1.7	105	▼40.8	10,910	▼22.89
2018	315,673	▲15.1	142	▲35.1	10,369	▼5.0
2019	457,231	▲44.8	0	Steady	12,170	▲17.4
2020	100,585	▼78.0	0	Steady	15,511	▲27.5
2021	35,145	▼65.1	0	Steady	16,658	▲12.7
2022	334,165	▲850.8	0	Steady	25,595	▲53.6
2023	517,160	▲54.8	0	Steady	25,181	▼1.6
^{Source: Malaysia Airports Holdings Berhad}

Busiest flights out of Sultan Azlan Shah Airport by frequency
Rank	Destinations	Frequency (weekly)	Airlines	Note
1	Singapore	19	Scoot	
2	Johor Bahru, Johor	9	Airasia	
