= Federation Air Service =

Malaysian airline (1951–1960)

Federation Air Service Khidmat Udara Persekutuan
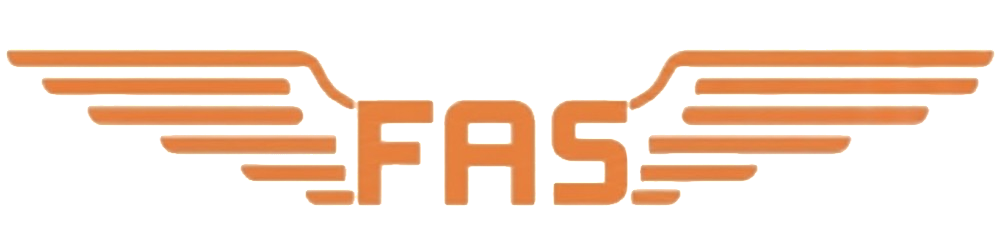
IATA	ICAO	Call sign
FS^{(1)}	FS^{(1)}	—
- Founded: 1951
- Ceased operations: 1960
- Hubs: Kuala Lumpur Airport (current RMAF Kuala Lumpur Air Base)
- Fleet size: 5
- Destinations: 44 (scheduled and charter)
- Parent company: Government of Malaya; Malayan Airways; Malayan Railways
- Headquarters: New Terminal Building, Kuala Lumpur Airport (1956)
- Key people: Max Oxford (acting director of civil aviation)

Notes
- (1) IATA, ICAO codes were the same until the 1980s

Federation Air Service (abbreviation: FAS; Malay: Khidmat Udara Persekutuan) was a regional airline operated out of Kuala Lumpur, with routes primarily located in Federation of Malaya (precursor of Malaysia).

A government-owned airline, it operated scheduled passenger, charter and air-mail service from its main base at Kuala Lumpur Airport (present-day RMAF Kuala Lumpur Air Base) between 1951 until 1960.

== History ==
=== 1951: Formation ===
Federation Air Service traced its origin in 1951, based on the needs of the government to improve the air transportation network and secured internal communications across the federation during the Malayan Emergency. The airline was aimed on connecting the smaller towns of the federation, which was then only accessible via land transport. Pursuant to the plan, the government has selected 5 units of de Havilland Canada DHC-2 Beaver aircraft for the missions. Additionally, various abandoned airfields in the secondary towns which was disused after the war was also being redeveloped for the feeder service.

The pilots are sourced from Malayan Airways on a contractual basis. The carrier planned to operate on three separate routes – towards north, south and central, with all of the networks originating from Kuala Lumpur, the capital of then-British Malaya. There are four aircraft for the mission, with the fifth aircraft reserved for charter and as a backup. Costing £15,000 each, the aircraft were ordered from United Kingdom and manufactured in Canada by de Havilland Aircraft Company. It was then delivered to Malaya via Singapore using a vessel from Isthmian Steamship Company. All of the aircraft are named after the Malayan birds.

The first two aircraft for the carrier arrived in Singapore from Canada in October 1951, as the carrier originally planned to commenced its operations in November 1951. Established as a project by the Federation government, the service is designed primarily for government officials, with the remaining seats offered for purchase to the general public.

=== 1951–1954: Beginning of operations ===
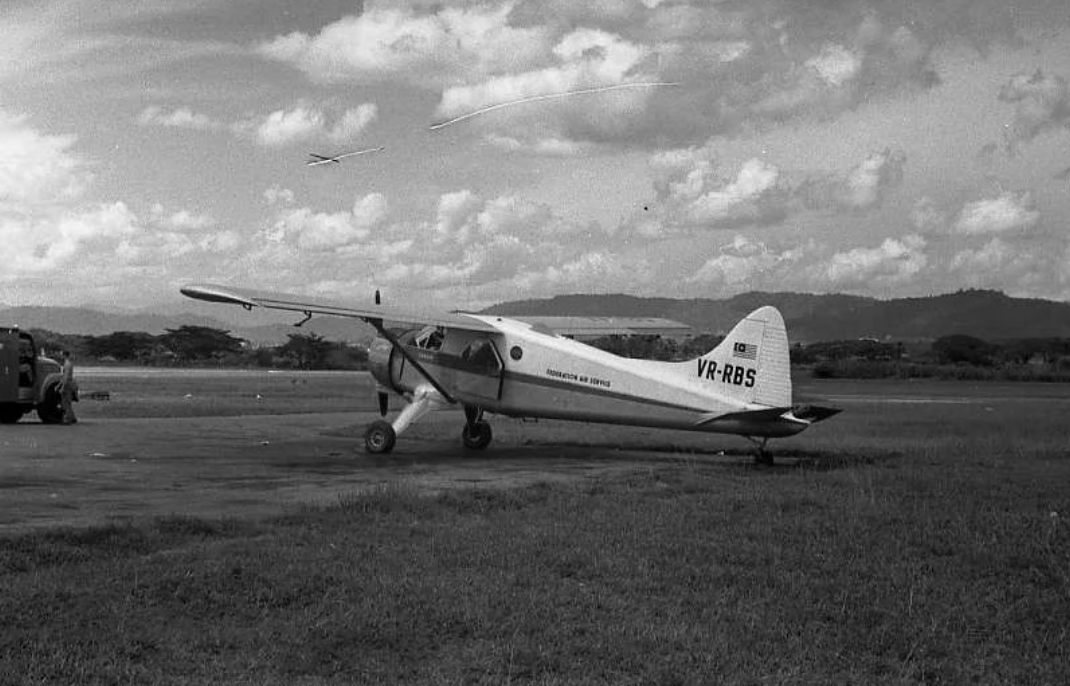
A Federation Air Service aircraft (VR-RBT)

Its inaugural flight was launched on 28 December 1951. The aircraft departed Kallang Airport, Singapore at 8:15 a.m and arrived in Kuala Lumpur at 11:15 a.m, the stopovers include Johor Bahru, Batu Pahat, Labis, Kluang and Malacca. The maiden flight was piloted by Capt. G. J. Rendwick. Due to the absence of advertisement, the first flight to Kuala Lumpur was flown without any passengers. The return trip however, the airline recorded one paying occupant — a member of the civil service, as well as two officials from Malayan Airways.

After the achievement of its southern circuit flights departing from Kuala Lumpur to Singapore, a central circuit route is planned to be introduced by March 1952. The planned central circuit flight is set to cater to the needs of the region, encompassing Pahang and the east coast, connecting Bentong, Benta, Temerloh, Kuantan, and Kuala Terengganu. The third and final phase will be the north-west circuit, covering north and west-bound destinations from Kuala Lumpur, consisting Jenderatala (near Teluk Anson), Sitiawan, Penang, Alor Setar, Kroh, Taiping and Ipoh. The northwest circuit, bound for Ipoh was introduced in July 1952, while its central route was extended to Kota Bharu in October 1952. A further extension was made for its northwest route to include Ulu Bernam, Kroh and Kuala Krai in late 1953.

Additionally, flight time between Malayan Airways and Federation Air Service are being coordinated to ensure a smooth transition for passengers transferring between the main trunk routes operated by Malayan Airways and the more outlying areas served by Federation Air Service. Mr. Max Oxford, acting director of Civil Aviation, states that seats on the Federation Air Service are open for purchase on a first-come, first-served basis and can be reserved at any time before a flight unless already sold. Furthermore, three seats allocated for Government and military officials will be released for sale to the general public if not claimed by 9:00 a.m the day before the flight.

Following the launch of the airline, the carrier has generated numerous interest from the public pertaining to its service, especially among the planters, miners and business officials. Pursuant to the inquiries, it was informed by the managing director of Civil Aviation, Max Oxford that the aim of the carrier is to provide an air link between the smaller towns. The carrier do not intended to compete with a direct flight between Kuala Lumpur to Singapore and rivaling with the already existing Malayan Airways schedule. Despite so, the managing director informed that during unique circumstances, it is possible to use a direct flight between the two major cities via the Federation Air Service.

Nevertheless, as the Malayan Emergency situation showed strong signs of improvement; as well as the increasing public trust in the safety of the southern road and railroad systems in Johore, the Federation Air Service experienced a diminished interest from the public for its southern route. Thus, he airline decided to terminate its southern route from 7 December 1953.

=== 1954–1958: Acquisition by Malayan Railways ===
The middle of 1954 saw a major change on the airline's stakeholders. Following the expiration of the agreement made between Malayan Airways and the Government of Malaya from 30 June 1954, the management of Federation Air Service was then continued by Malayan Railways company.

The change would also witnessed a new opportunities for the aviation company. From 1 July 1954, the Federation Air Service tickets was also began to be sold at the train stations across the federation. Despite the takeover, it was being informed that there was no changes on the timetable, routes nor any withdrawal from the existing ticketing agents. However, it was hoped by Max Oxford, the Director of Malayan Civil Aviation that by combining the rail and regional air service under the same management, it will result a profit for the company due to the overhead cost-cutting measures.

=== 1958–1960: Merger with Malayan Airways ===
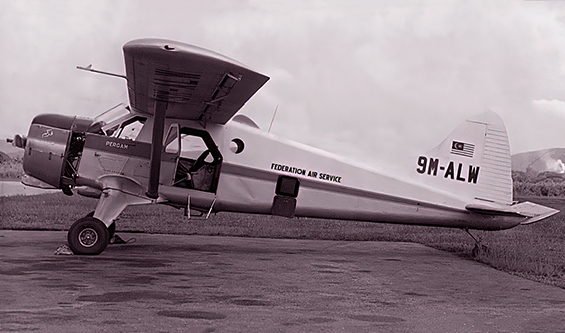
A Federation Air Service aircraft (9M-ALW), after being re-registered following the change on the national registration code

The contract between Federation Air Service and Malayan Railways ended in February 1958. Subsequent to the contract's completion, the airline is now managed by Malayan Airways. The Government of Malaya, being another major stakeholder of the Federation Air Service, decided to terminate all of the unprofitable routes.

The termination of the routes was done as the feeder airline service was running on a loss since its inception in 1951. Based on the official records, by 1957, the carrier recorded a loss of $280,860, an increase compared to $140,986 loss in 1956. The financial setback resulted from various factors, such as increased payroll costs, additional expenditures for provisions and an overall decrease in chartered flights.

Additionally, the Federation Air Service was originally established to provide a safe and reliable means of transportation during the height of Malayan Emergency. However, as stability restored across Malaya towards the end of 1950s, the needs and relevance of Federation Air Service gradually become obsolete.

=== 1960: End of operations ===
The Federation Air Service wrapped up its western route flights in March 1958, signaling the end of its operations in that area. The conclusion of the western route flights in March 1958 marked the second significant route closure for the Federation Air Service, following the termination of the southern route 5 years earlier in December 1953.

The final flight for the eastern route to Kuala Terengganu took place around 1960. These milestones marked the overall discontinuation of the Federation Air Service, reflecting adjustments in response to changing demands, economic factors, and the evolving transportation landscape of the time.

== Fleet ==
Federation Air Service Fleet
Aircraft	Total	Passengers	Notes
DHC-2 Beaver	5	6	The aircraft were re-registered from VR-Rxx to Malaysian Registration 9M-Axx in 1959 pursuant to the change of national registration code.

== Destinations ==
Historically, Federation Air Service operated scheduled flights into the following destinations:

- Selangor – Kuala Lumpur-Simpang, Ulu Bernam
- Pahang – Bentong, Benta, Temerloh, Jenderatala, Kuantan
- Perak – Setiawan, Ipoh, Bidor, Labu Kubong
- Terengganu – Kuala Terengganu, Dungun, Kemaman (Chukai)
- Kelantan – Kota Bharu
- Malacca – Malacca
- Johor – Batu Pahat, Kluang, Johor Bahru, Mersing, Segamat
- Singapore-Kallang

In addition to these scheduled services, the airline also included other chartered destinations in its flight offerings.

== Accidents and incidents ==
- On 11 June 1958, a Federation Air Service aircraft (VR-RBU) was destroyed by fire in Kuala Lumpur Airport. The aircraft was later written-off from service.

== See also ==
- Borneo Airways, another Malayan Airways subsidiary of the same era
