= RMAF Kuala Lumpur Air Base =

Former airport of Kuala Lumpur, Malaysia (1930–2018)

RMAF Kuala Lumpur Sungai Besi Air Base Simpang Airport TUDM Kuala Lumpur Pangkalan Udara Sungai Besi Lapangan Terbang Simpang
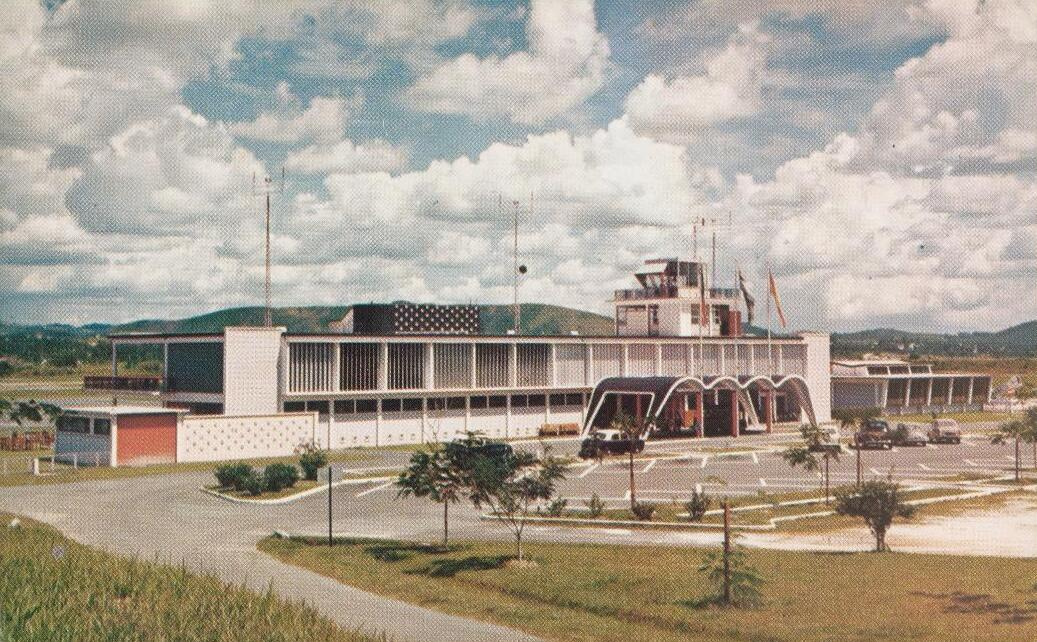
- Sungai Besi Airport terminal on 1 August 1956
- IATA: none; ICAO: WMKF

Summary
- Owner: Ministry of Defence
- Operator: Royal Malaysian Air Force
- Location: Sungai Besi, Kuala Lumpur, Malaysia
- Opened: 1952
- Closed: 14 March 2018
- Passenger services ceased: 30 August 1965
- Hub for: Federation Air Service (1951–1960); Malayan Airways (1952–1965)
- Built: 1930
- Time zone: MST (UTC+08:00)
- Elevation AMSL: 111 ft (34 m)
- Coordinates: 03°06′41″N 101°42′10″E

Maps
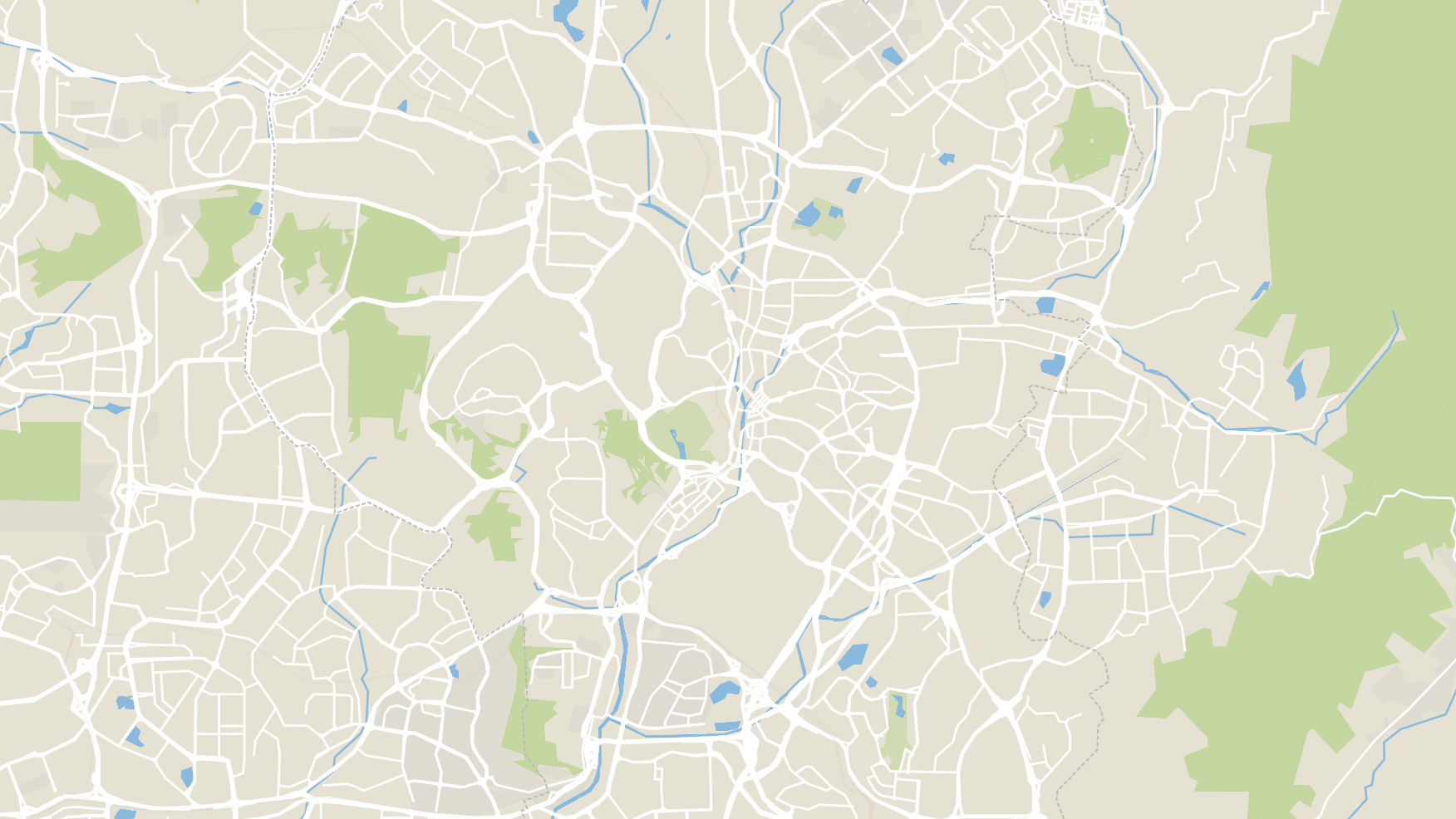
- Kuala Lumpur Federal Territory in Malaysia

- Location in Kuala Lumpur, Peninsular Malaysia WMKF (Peninsular Malaysia) WMKF (Malaysia)

Runways
Direction	Length		Surface
Direction	m	ft	Surface
04/22	1,199	3,934	Tarmac (closed)
- Sources: AIP Malaysia

Simpang Air Base
- RAF Kuala Lumpur
- Part of Royal Malaysian Air Force

Site information
- Type: Air Force Base
- Condition: Military Airport

Site history
- Built: 1930
- In use: 1930-2018
- Battles/wars: Malayan Emergency

RMAF Kuala Lumpur (ICAO: WMKF), also known as the Sungai Besi Air Base and Simpang Airport, was an airport in Kuala Lumpur in the early years of Malaysia's aviation history. Established in the 1930s, it was the gateway of both domestic and international flights for Kuala Lumpur and Malaya for several decades, connecting them to global destinations.

In 1965, Sungai Besi Airport was replaced by Subang International Airport (now Sultan Abdul Aziz Shah Airport) as Kuala Lumpur's main airport. The Sungai Besi Airport was subsequently repurposed as a military facility for the Royal Malaysian Air Force (RMAF), and was renamed as the RMAF Kuala Lumpur Air Base. The base housed military operations, training facilities, and the RMAF Museum, which showcased Malaysia's aviation heritage. In 2018, the airport ceased all operations in order to make way for the proposed Bandar Malaysia project, a large-scale mixed-use development on the site. The project however have faced several postpontment and hurdles, and have yet to commence as of 2026.

== History ==
=== Early operations ===
The development of Sungai Besi Airport began in 1930 on a site previously used for tin mining. By 1933, the airport welcomed its first commercial flight, an aircraft from the Imperial Airways, specifically the Armstrong Whitworth Atlanta, which was among the first to land at the airstrip.

In 1936, the airstrip was upgraded and licensed as an all-purpose landing ground capable of accommodating light and medium aircraft. After the disruptions of World War II, further expansions were undertaken in 1948 to enable the airport to handle increased post-war air traffic.

=== Growth ===
In 1952, Sungai Besi was officially designated as the main airport for Kuala Lumpur, handling both domestic and international flights. The airport underwent significant improvements, including the completion of a new terminal building. On 1 August 1956, Tunku Abdul Rahman officially designated it as an international airport, alongside the upgrades made to support increasing international traffic.

Following Malaysia's independence in 1957, the country became a Contracting State of the International Civil Aviation Organization (ICAO), which enhanced the role of Sungai Besi in global aviation networks. The airport recorded substantial passenger traffic during this era, cementing its status as a vital aviation hub.

By the 1960s, Malaysia's aviation infrastructure had begun to further expand. The formation of Malaysia in 1963 further integrated aviation services across the newly united territories. However, the development of Subang International Airport (now Sultan Abdul Aziz Shah Airport) in the mid-1960s marked a turning point. On 30 August 1965, Sungai Besi ceased operations as a commercial airport and transitioned into a military base under the Royal Malaysian Air Force (RMAF).

=== As RMAF Air Base ===
Following the relocation of commercial aviation operations to Subang International Airport in 1965, Sungai Besi Airport transitioned into a military facility under the RMAF and eventually came to be known as the RMAF Kuala Lumpur Air Base. The facility played a critical role in military operations, aircraft maintenance and training exercises for the RMAF. In 1982, the RMAF Museum was established at the base, showcasing Malaysia's aviation heritage and displaying historical aircraft such as the de Havilland Tiger Moth.

As aviation technology advanced and military needs evolved, plans were developed in the late 1990s to move the RMAF base to a more modern facility. The relocation was aimed at providing better infrastructure and support for the Royal Malaysian Air Force’s operations.

=== Closure ===
In 2010, the Malaysian government officially announced the relocation of the RMAF base from Sungai Besi to Sendayan. The move, finalised on 5 August 2010, paved the way for redevelopment plans. Under the Bandar Malaysia initiative, launched in 2011 by Prime Minister Najib Razak, the site was earmarked for a mixed-use urban development. Bandar Malaysia aimed to include residential, commercial and infrastructure projects, such as the Kuala Lumpur–Singapore high-speed rail station, though the rail project faced delays due to financial challenges.

On 16 March 2018, the RMAF ceased all operations at Sungai Besi Airport, officially ending the site's role as a military base. The proposed Bandar Malaysia redevelopment project, which envisiond the site to become a major commercial and residential hub in Kuala Lumpur, was however facing delays and postpontments following the 2018 general elections, and has yet to officially commence as of 2026.

== See also ==
- Royal Malaysian Air Force bases
- List of airports in Malaysia
