= Straits Steamship Company =

Singaporean shipping company

Straits Steamship Company Limited
- House Flag
- Type: Public
- Industry: Transportation
- Founded: 1890; 136 years ago
- Founder: Theodore Bogaardt
- Defunct: 1980s
- Headquarters: Singapore
- Area served: Southeast Asia

Straits Steamship Company Limited was a shipping company based in Singapore which principally engaged in transportation of passengers and goods, and operated throughout Southeast Asia from 1890 to the 1980s.

== History ==
Straits Steamship Company Limited was founded in 1890 in Singapore by Dutchman, Theodore Bogaardt with an initial capital of $421,000 Straits, all subscribed by local individuals including wealthy Chinese businessmen Tan Jiak Kim; Lee Cheng Yan; Lim Ho Pua; and Tan Keong Saik. The new company initially had a fleet of five vessels: Sappho (166 tons); Will o' the Wisp (166 tons); Malacca (405 tons); Billiton (195 tons); and Hye Leong (296 tons), and began services transporting passengers, particularly labourers going to and from the estates, and goods including tin, consumer goods, tea, coffee, spices, and later rubber, along the west coast of Malaya.

In 1899, Bogaardt retired as manager, the company having recruited C.H. Laird of Liverpool shipbuilders, and in 1902, when Laird retired, D. K. Sommerville assumed control of the company, and many new vessels were added to the fleet. During the First World War, a number of vessels were requisitioned by the government and served as far away as the Persian Gulf. Under Sommerville's stewardship the company expanded, acquiring in 1922 the Eastern Shipping Company, in so doing gaining rights to trade in western Siam and Burma, and the Sabah Steamship Company which ran services in North Borneo. The following year, the company, whose fleet had grown to 24 vessels, moved into new premises in Collyer Quay.

Before the Second World War, elaborate plans were made for the company's fleet to assist the fighting services by providing supplies and during the war to 53 ports in Malaya, Siam, Burma, Sumatra, Borneo, and the Philippines, were serviced by its 51 vessels. A number of its ships were requisitioned by the Royal Navy, were armed and carried depth-charges and served in combat roles including escorting vessels and joining patrols. It suffered heavy losses in vessels and personnel with only seven ships remaining afloat by the end of the conflict.

The recovery of the company during the post-war period is considered to rank amongst its greatest achievements, and by 1950 it had recovered its losses having acquired 54 vessels. During this time it diversified into other activities including aviation and flew its first commercial flight in 1947. In 1957, it became a public company. During the 1970s and 1980s, it expanded its operations into land, warehousing and distribution services, property, and leisure. In 1983, Keppel Corporation Ltd acquired a 83% share in the company, later becoming part of Keppel Land, and the shipping business was separated, forming Steamers Maritime Holdings Ltd which was taken over by the Keppel Group in 1997.

== Straits Steamship Prize ==
The National University of Singapore's Faculty of Arts and Social Sciences continues to award the Straits Steamship Prize to the top history and political science undergraduate annually. Notably, Singaporean politician Pritam Singh was the recipient of the prize in 1999.
