= Amal (airline) =

Malaysia Aviation Group subsidiary specializing in Hajj and Umrah travel

Amal by Malaysia Airlines
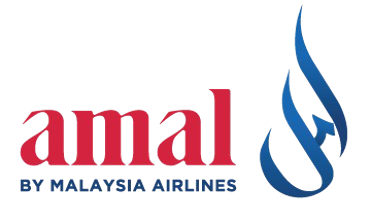
IATA	ICAO	Call sign
MH	MAS	MALAYSIAN
- Founded: October 2018; 8 years ago
- Commenced operations: 12 February 2019; 7 years ago
- Hubs: Kuala Lumpur International Airport
- Parent company: Malaysia Airlines
- Headquarters: Kuala Lumpur International Airport, Sepang, Selangor, Malaysia
- Key people: Muhammad Najmi Mansor (COO)
- Website: www.iflyamal.com

Amal is a Malaysian charter subsidiary of the Malaysia Aviation Group (MAG), which also includes Malaysia Airlines, Firefly and MASkargo. It specialises in providing travel services for Muslim pilgrims, focusing on the Hajj and Umrah pilgrimage markets. Officially launched on February 12, 2019, marking Malaysia Airlines' formal entry into the religious travel sector. Amal was initially conceived as a standalone entity but was later integrated into the broader Malaysia Airlines group.

Focused primarily on Southeast Asia, Amal serves key markets in Malaysia, Indonesia and Thailand, offering flights to Saudi Arabia's major pilgrimage cities, Jeddah and Medina. The airline aims to provide a premium and comprehensive service for Muslim travelers, addressing both their spiritual and logistical needs during their pilgrimage.

Amal services go beyond standard air travel, incorporating religious elements such as in-flight prayers, Azan announcements and content related to the pilgrimage rituals. Following the impact of the COVID-19 pandemic, Amal resumed operations in late 2021 and has since expanded its capacity, with plans to increase its contribution to Malaysia Airlines' revenue and expand its presence in new markets, including regions in South Asia, Central Asia and Africa.

== History ==
=== Early involvement in pilgrimage flights ===
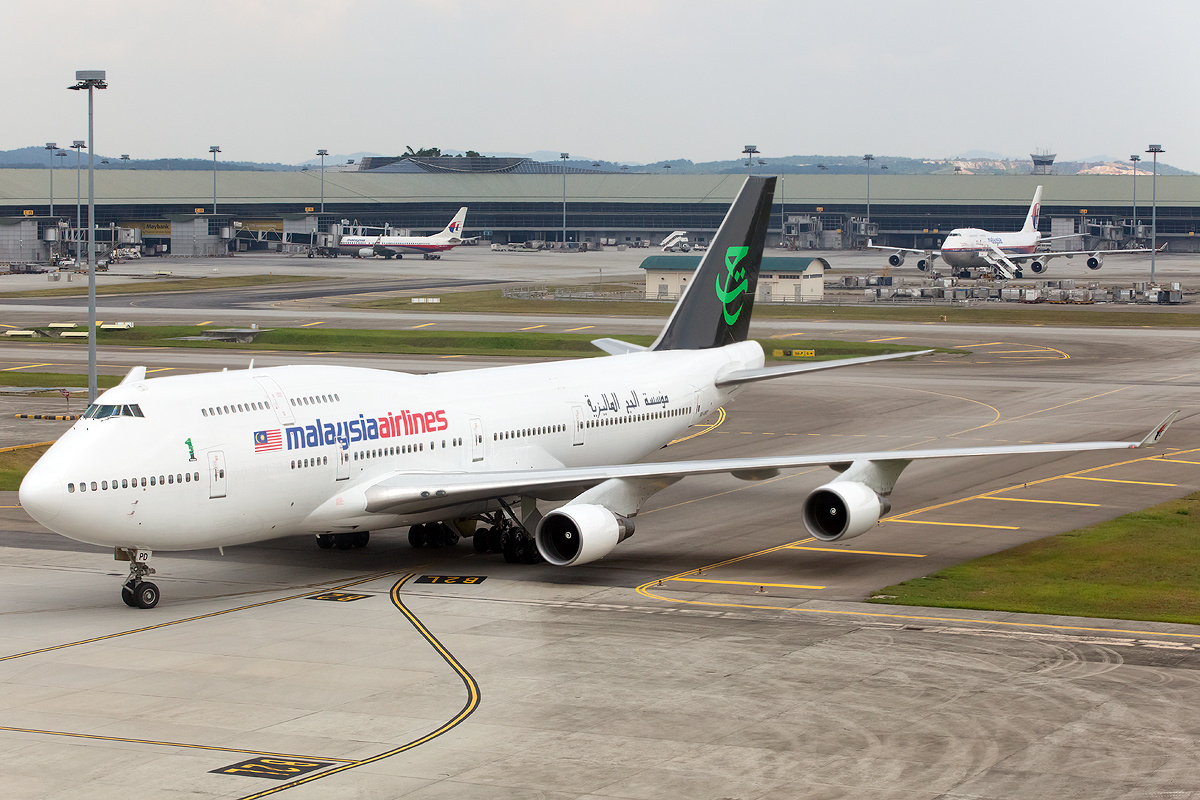
Malaysia Airlines Boeing 747-400 in special Hajj livery, photographed in 2011, used for pilgrimage flights prior to the establishment of the Amal brand in 2019

Malaysia Airlines commenced its Hajj operations on October 6, 1974, with its inaugural flight departing from Subang International Airport. Prior to this, Malaysian Hajj travelers had relied on chartered aircraft from Pakistan International Airlines and Sudan Airways for their journey to Saudi Arabia.

In its inaugural year, Malaysian Airline System transported 3,200 pilgrims, which accounted for half of the total number, with the remaining Hajj passengers traveling by sea. A total of 21 chartered flights were conducted, each carrying 169 passengers, under a charter agreement worth RM3.2 million.

The final sea voyage for Malaysian pilgrims to Saudi Arabia occurred in 1976, after which all Hajj travel was conducted by air. By 1977, Malaysian Airline System became the sole carrier for Malaysian Hajj operations, a role it maintained until 1997, significantly improving the efficiency and reliability of pilgrimage travel. This early involvement laid the foundation for the establishment of AMAL in 2019.

With the liberalisation of Malaysia's air travel industry from 1997 onwards, Malaysia Airlines was no longer the exclusive provider of Hajj flights. As a result, other airlines, including domestic operators such as AirAsia, Transmile and Eaglexpress, along with international carriers like Saudia, began offering Hajj services for Malaysian pilgrims.

=== 2017–2019: Project Hope and the formation of Amal ===
The foundation of Amal by Malaysia Airlines was laid in 2017 when Malaysia Aviation Group (MAG) unveiled an initiative known as Project Hope. This project focused on converting Malaysia Airlines' six Airbus A380 aircraft into a specialised high-capacity charter airline, primarily designed to serve Hajj and Umrah pilgrims. Introduced in June 2017, the airline was envisioned as the world's first "ultra high-capacity" charter service.

In October 2018, the concept of Amal was formally developed with the aim of enhancing Malaysia Airlines' pilgrimage services. The airline sought to address a gap in the market by providing a premium pilgrimage experience that went beyond traditional travel options. This service was designed as a comprehensive package for pilgrims, encompassing flights, accommodations and ground transportation to the holy cities of Mecca and Madinah.

Ahead of Amal's official launch in February 2019, Malaysia Airlines began initial operations using its existing fleet. These operations focused on charter flights during the Hajj season, connecting Kuala Lumpur to major cities in Saudi Arabia, such as Jeddah and Madinah. This phase helped the airline establish a foothold in the competitive pilgrimage travel market.

=== 2019–2020: Official launch and growth ===
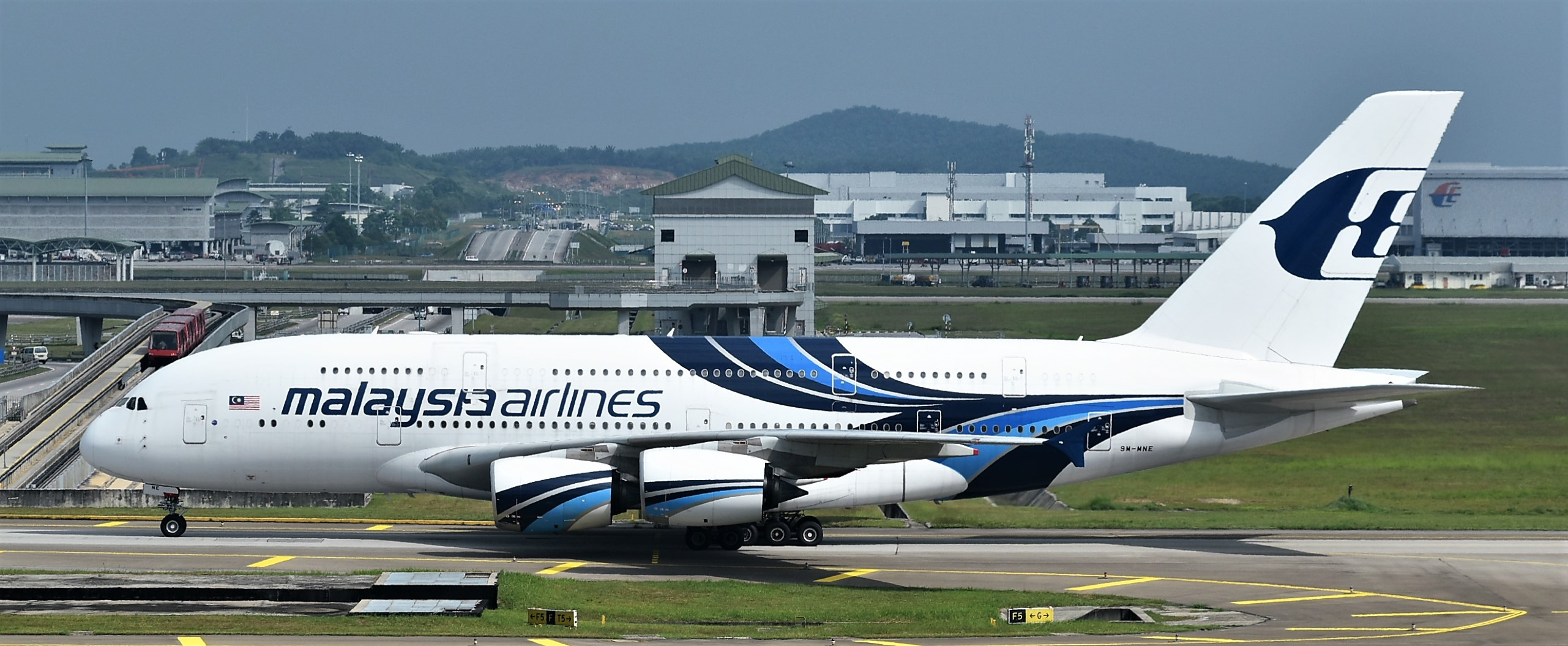
Malaysia Airlines Airbus A380 at Kuala Lumpur International Airport, previously used for Amal's Hajj and Umrah charter operations before transitioning to Airbus A330 aircraft

Amal by Malaysia Airlines was officially launched on February 12, 2019, marking the airline's formal entry into the Hajj and Umrah travel sector. The launch event, attended by key figures including Malaysia's Economic Affairs Minister, highlighted the service's significance in Malaysia Airlines' long-term business strategy. Amal's branding and operations were designed to provide a premium pilgrimage experience, addressing both the practical and spiritual needs of travelers.

Initially, Amal was conceived as a standalone airline focused on pilgrimage, with plans to refurbish and reconfigure Malaysia Airlines' A380s for this purpose. The airline was to be registered as a separate entity with its own logo, aircraft livery and payroll. However, over time, AMAL became a brand under Malaysia Airlines' broader portfolio rather than a fully independent airline.

The service initially targeted Southeast Asia, focusing on Malaysia, Indonesia and Thailand, regions with large Muslim populations and high demand for pilgrimage travel. Amal aimed to capture a significant portion of the Umrah market, positioning itself as a high-end service provider for Muslim travelers. The airline's initial goals included capturing 60% of the Malaysian Umrah market, 10% of the Indonesian market and flying around 13,000 pilgrims from Thailand within a few years of its launch.

=== 2020–2023: Challenges and recovery post-COVID ===
The COVID-19 pandemic had a severe impact on Amal, forcing it to suspend operations amid global travel restrictions. The Hajj pilgrimage was also suspended for two consecutive years, further affecting Amal's services.

Amal resumed operations on October 30, 2021, with flight MH8216 to Madinah, marking the airline's first scheduled flight to Saudi Arabia in nearly two years. This followed the reopening of Saudi Arabia's borders to fully vaccinated international travelers, particularly those intending to perform Umrah and Hajj. By November 30, 2021, Amal had expanded its operations to up to eight weekly flights from Kuala Lumpur to Jeddah and Madinah. The first flight showed strong demand, and by May 2022, Amal aimed to accommodate up to 75,000 passengers, contingent on the ongoing COVID-19 situation.

As Saudi Arabia reopened its borders to international pilgrims on August 1, 2022, Amal also prepared for a rapid recovery, with a target to return to pre-pandemic levels by Q4 2022. For the upcoming Umrah season (1443 Hijrah), the airline aimed to begin flights on November 15, 2022, operating two daily flights with three aircraft, gradually increasing flights to three or four daily as the Hajj season approached. Before the pandemic, Amal had operated three daily flights using A380-800 and A330 aircraft, but planned to exclusively use the A330 for future operations.

In 2023, Amal benefitted from Malaysia Airlines' broader recovery, supported by rising demand for Hajj and Umrah travel, Saudi Arabia's increased pilgrim capacity and the introduction of e-Tourist Visas. These factors helped Amal contribute 5% to the parent company's revenue, with plans to increase this contribution to 7.5–8.0% over the next three to five years.

=== 2024–present: Future aspirations ===
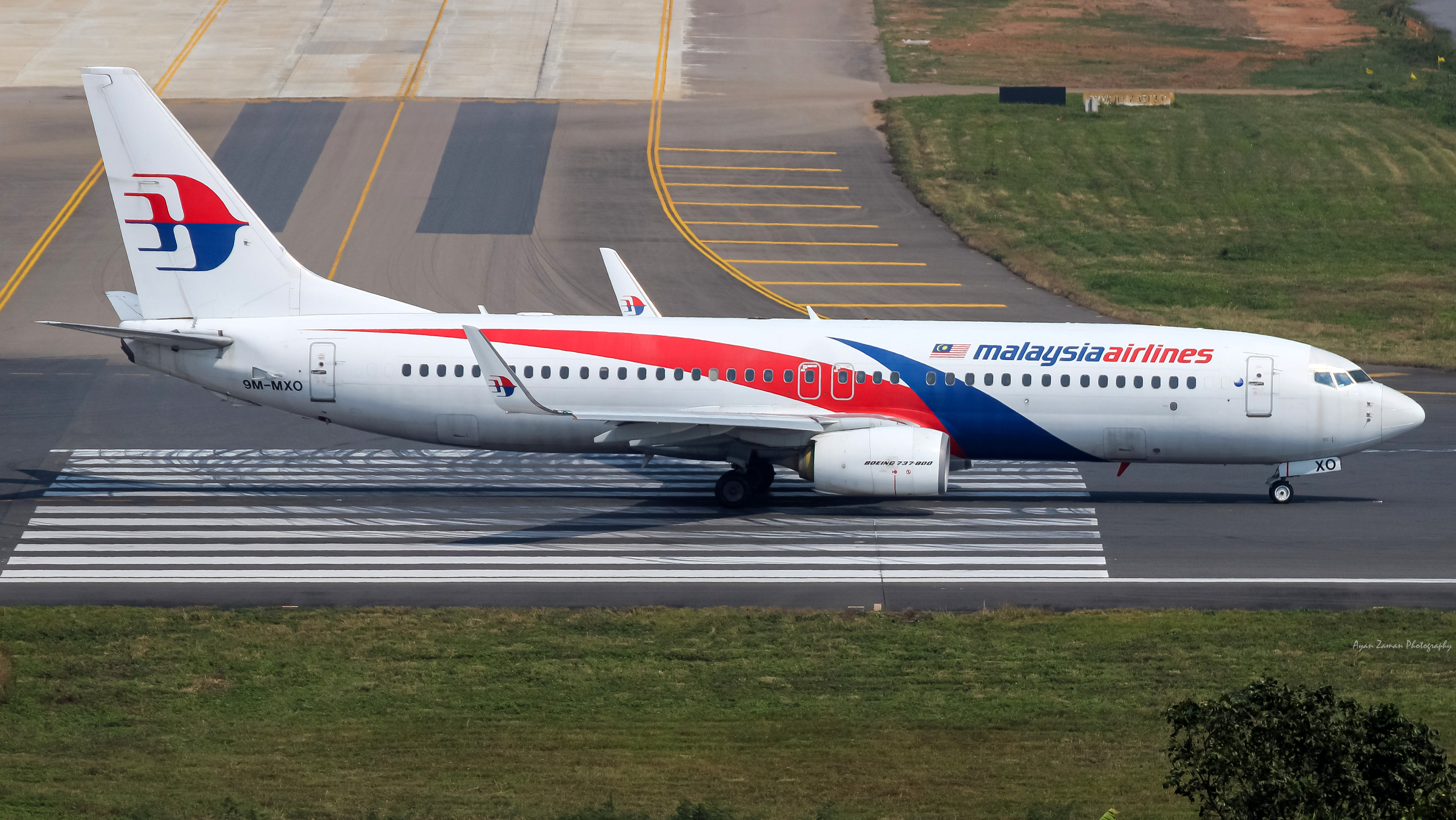
Malaysia Airlines Boeing 737-800, utilised by Amal for feeder flights connecting regional airports to Kuala Lumpur International Airport for Hajj and Umrah travelers

Amal plans to double its annual Umrah pilgrim capacity from 20,000 to 40,000 passengers within the next three to five years. Between January and April 2024, the airline transported an average of 20,000 Umrah pilgrims monthly, supported by three daily flights to Jeddah and Madinah. To achieve its target, Amal aims for annual growth of 5–10%, driven by increasing demand for its services. The airline has also expanded its operations in Indonesia, flying pilgrims from six cities, including Jakarta and Surabaya, with transit through Kuala Lumpur International Airport. Approximately 10% of its current Umrah passengers are from Indonesia, alongside pilgrims from Singapore, southern Thailand and Indochina.

In July 2024, Amal launched its inaugural direct flight from Johor Bahru to Madinah, marking the airline's first direct service to Saudi Arabia from outside its home base at Kuala Lumpur International Airport. The once-weekly flight operates from Senai International Airport to Prince Mohammad bin Abdulaziz International Airport, offering greater convenience for pilgrims from Malaysia's southern region, as well as Singapore and nearby Indonesian cities like Batam, Bintan and the Riau Islands Province. Amal will also operate a return flight from Jeddah to Johor Bahru, further enhancing its services.

In addition to increasing its passenger capacity, Amal is focused on expanding to new markets in Africa, South Asia and Central Asia, regions with growing interest in Hajj and Umrah travel. While regulatory challenges remain, the airline is exploring strategic partnerships, including discussions with Saudi Airlines and other carriers. Since its establishment in 2019, Amal has transported 1.17 million pilgrims and continues to enhance its services, such as operating 110 flights during the 2024 Hajj season with Airbus A330-300 aircraft. Revenue contributions from Amal to Malaysia Aviation Group currently stand at 5%, with plans to increase this to 7.5–8% within three to five years, supported by Saudi Arabia's expanded pilgrim capacity, the use of e-Tourist Visas, and an ever-growing network.

== Fleet ==
Amal operates the Airbus A330, which is well-suited for medium to long-haul flights. Previously, the airline used a combination of Airbus A380 and A330 aircraft, with the A380 offering higher capacity, but transitioned entirely to the A330 following Malaysia Airlines' decision to retire the A380.

Amal also operates Boeing 737-800 aircraft for feeder flights connecting other regional airports to Kuala Lumpur International Airport. This facilitates the transportation of pilgrims from various cities in Malaysia and Indonesia to its hub for onward travel to Saudi Arabia.

== Services ==
The airline incorporated unique elements into its operations to align with the religious significance of the travel. These included the boarding audio of Talbiyah and Nasyid, as well as onboard provisions such as Musaffir prayers, Azan announcements and reminders for Miqat, the designated points where pilgrims begin specific rituals.

The in-flight entertainment system was adapted to include religious content, such as Tazkirah (reminders), to further support the spiritual aspect of the journey. These elements aimed to enhance the spiritual nature of the journey.

Amal cabin crew uniforms are distinct from those of Malaysia Airlines' commercial flight crews, reflecting the airline's focus on Hajj and Umrah services. Female crew members wear the hijab, while male crew members are prepared to assist with religious needs, such as reciting prayers and making Azan announcements. Additionally, the crew is trained to assist elderly passengers, support individuals with disabilities, and provide basic medical aid, ensuring a smooth and comfortable journey for all travelers.

== See also ==
- Tabung Haji
- List of airlines of Malaysia
- Transport in Malaysia
