= EZX =

EZX may refer to:

- EZX, Linux-based mobile operating system documented by OpenEZX
- EZX, ICAO code for defunct Malaysian charter airline Eaglexpress
- EZX, ICAO code for defunct Zimbabwean airline Express Airlines
- EZX, drum sample expansion format for Toontrack software
- EZX, specification for extended-reach optical transceivers used in Small Form-factor Pluggable
