= Malaysia Airlines =

National airline of Malaysia

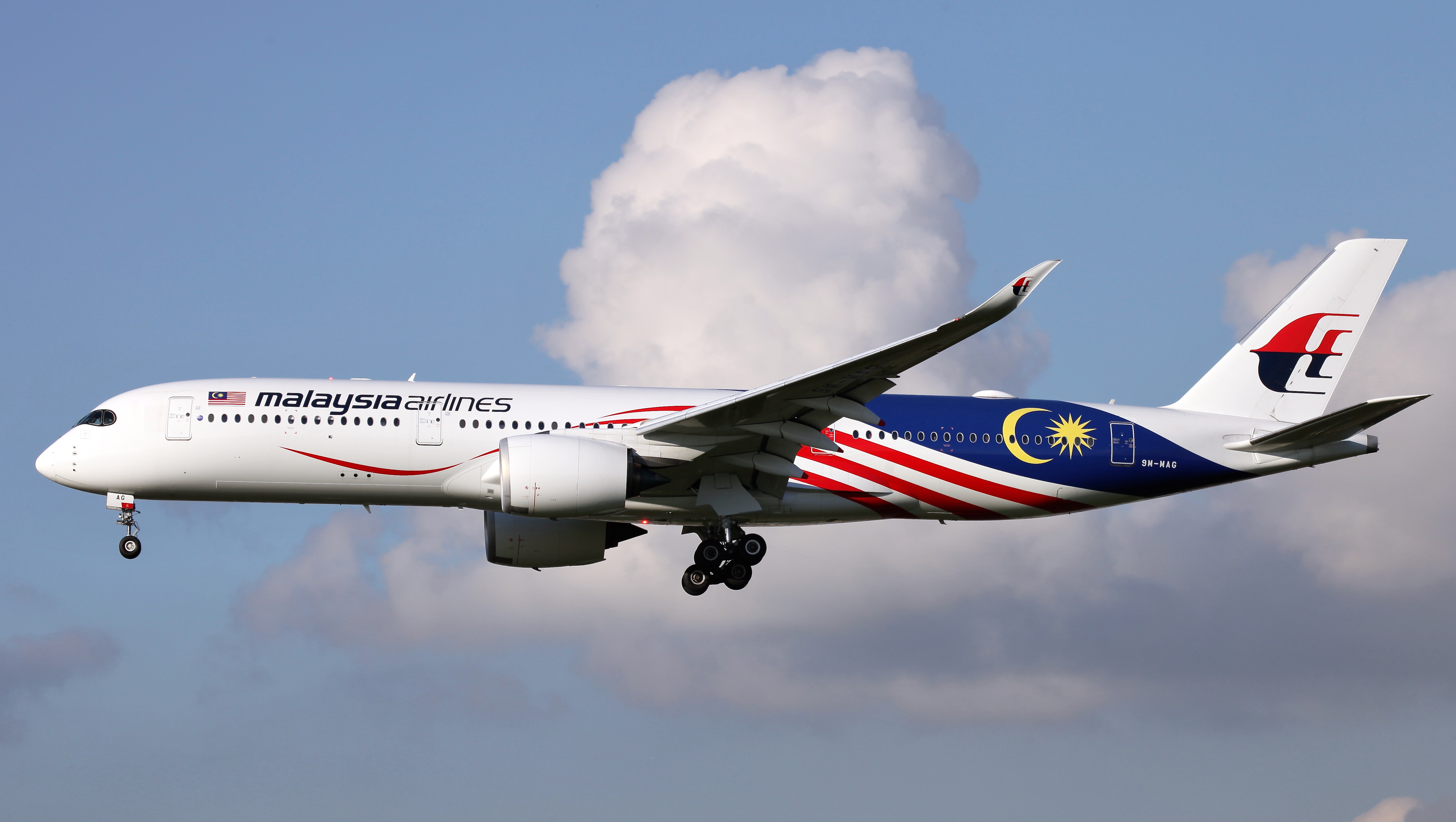
- Malaysia Airlines Airbus A350-900
IATA	ICAO	Call sign
MH	MAS	MALAYSIAN
- Founded: 1 May 1947; 79 years ago (as Malayan Airways)
- Commenced operations: 1 October 1972; 54 years ago (as Malaysian Airline System); 1 September 2015; 11 years ago (as Malaysia Airlines Berhad)
- Hubs: Kuala Lumpur International Airport
- Secondary hubs: Kota Kinabalu International Airport
- Focus cities: Kuching International Airport
- Frequent-flyer program: Enrich
- Alliance: Oneworld
- Subsidiaries: Amal; Firefly; MASkargo
- Fleet size: 86
- Destinations: 69
- Parent company: Khazanah Nasional Berhad
- Headquarters: Kuala Lumpur International Airport, Sepang, Selangor, Malaysia
- Key people: Nasaruddin Bakar (President & CEO); Boo Hui Yee (CFO); Bryan Foong (COO); Low Wen Long (CSO)
- Profit: ▼RM139 million (2025)
- Employees: 12,000
- Website: www.malaysiaairlines.com

Malaysia Airlines Berhad, operating as Malaysia Airlines (Malay: Penerbangan Malaysia), is the flag carrier of Malaysia, headquartered at Kuala Lumpur International Airport. The airline flies to destinations across Europe, Oceania and Asia from its main hub at Kuala Lumpur International Airport. It was formerly known as Malaysian Airline System (Malay: Sistem Penerbangan Malaysia).

Malaysia Airlines is a part of Malaysia Aviation Group, which also owns one subsidiary airline: Firefly. Malaysia Airlines also owns a freighter division: MASkargo and the religious charter subsidiary, Amal.

Malaysia Airlines traces its history to Malayan Airways Limited, which was founded in Singapore in the 1930s and flew its first commercial flight in 1947. It was then renamed as Malaysian Airways after the formation of the independent country, Malaysia, in 1963. In 1966, after the separation of Singapore, the airline was renamed Malaysia–Singapore Airlines (MSA), before its assets were divided in 1972 to permanently form two separate and distinct national airlines—Malaysian Airline System (MAS, since renamed as Malaysia Airlines) and Singapore Airlines (SIA).

Despite numerous awards from the aviation industry in the 2000s and early 2010s, the airline struggled to cut costs to cope with the rise of low-cost carriers (LCCs) in the region since the early 2000s. In 2013, the airline initiated a turnaround plan after large losses beginning in 2011 and cut routes to unprofitable long-haul destinations, such as Los Angeles, Buenos Aires and South Africa. That same year, Malaysia Airlines also began an internal restructuring and intended to sell units such as engineering and pilot training. From 2014 to 2015, the airline declared bankruptcy and was renationalised by the government under a new entity, which involved transferring all operations, including assets and liabilities as well as downsizing the airline.

== History ==
=== 1947–1963: Malayan Airways ===
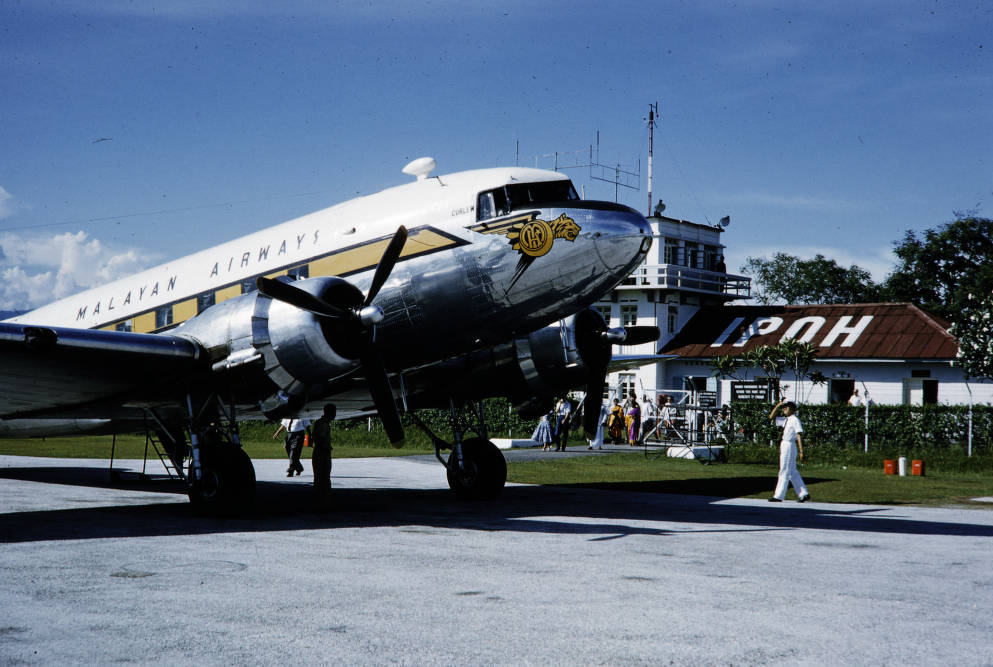
Malayan Airways Douglas DC-3

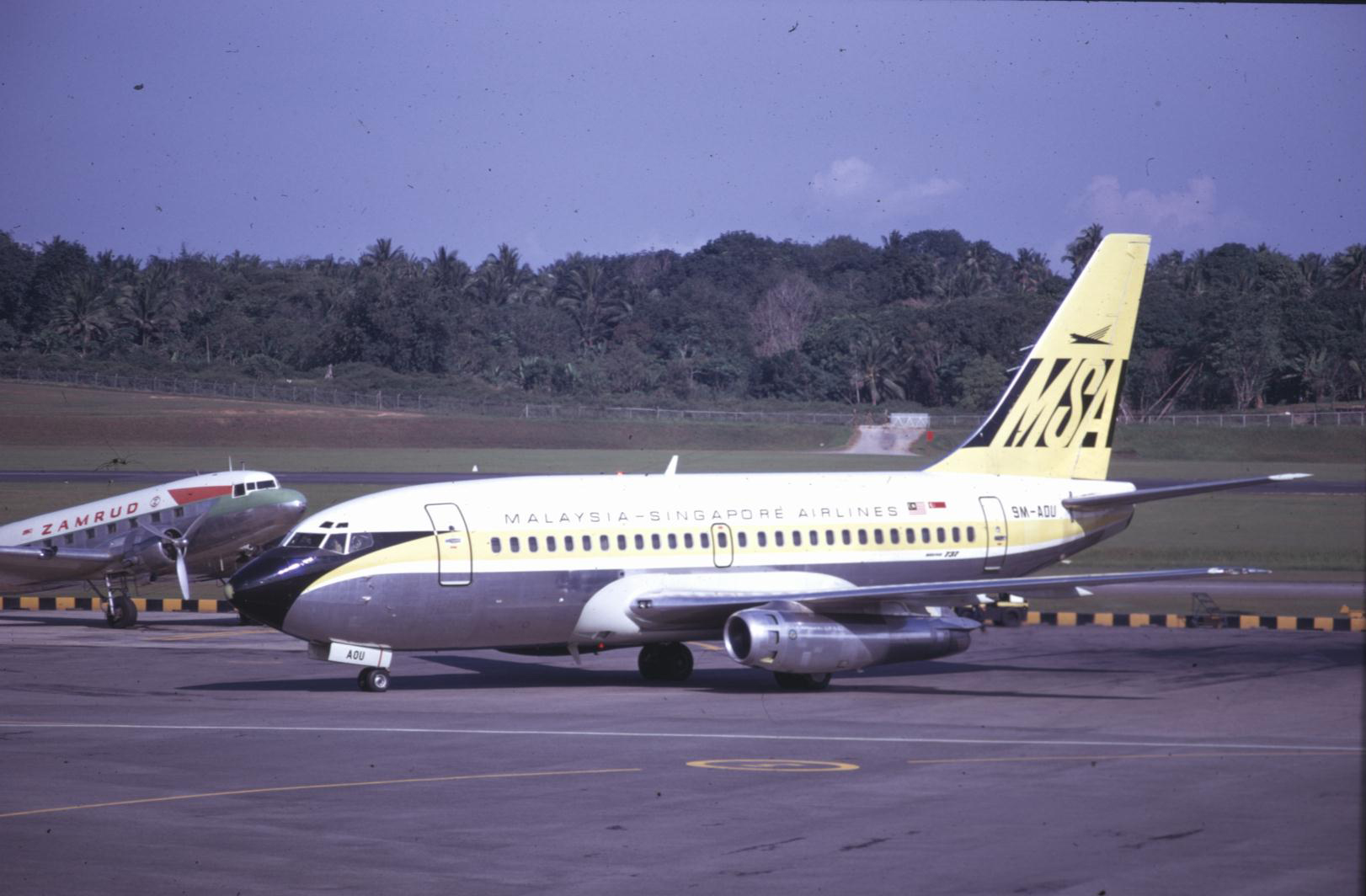
Malaysia-Singapore Airlines Boeing B-737

An initiative by the Alfred Holt's Liverpool-based Ocean Steamship Company, in partnership with the Straits Steamship Company and Imperial Airways, resulted in the incorporation of "Malayan Airways Limited" (MAL) in Singapore on 12 October 1937, but the first paying passengers could be welcomed on board only in 1947, some 10 years later. After the war, MAL was restructured to include just the partnership of Straits Steamship and Ocean Steamship. The airline's first flight was a charter flight from the British Straits Settlement of Singapore to Kuala Lumpur, on 2 April 1947, using an Airspeed Consul twin-engined aircraft. This inaugural flight on the Raja Udang, with only five passengers, departed Singapore's Kallang Airport and was bound for Kuala Lumpur's Sungai Besi Airport. Weekly scheduled flights quickly followed from Singapore to Kuala Lumpur, Ipoh, and Penang from 1 May 1947 with the same aircraft type.

The airline continued to expand during the rest of the 1940s and 1950s, as other British Commonwealth airlines, such as BOAC and Qantas Empire Airways, provided technical assistance, as well as assistance in joining the IATA. By 1955, Malayan Airways' fleet had grown to include a large number of Douglas DC-3s, and finally went public in 1957. Other aircraft operated in the first two decades included the Douglas DC-4 Skymaster, Vickers Viscount, Lockheed L-1049 Super Constellation, Bristol Britannia, de Havilland Comet 4, and Fokker F27.

=== 1963–1972: Rapid expansion, Malaysian Airways, and Malaysia-Singapore Airlines ===
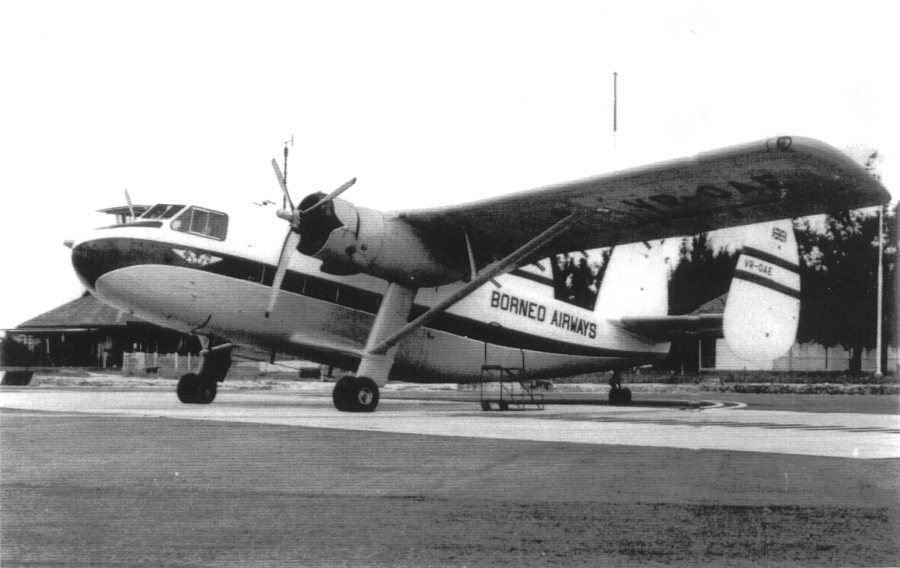
Borneo Airways Scottish Aviation Twin Pioneer

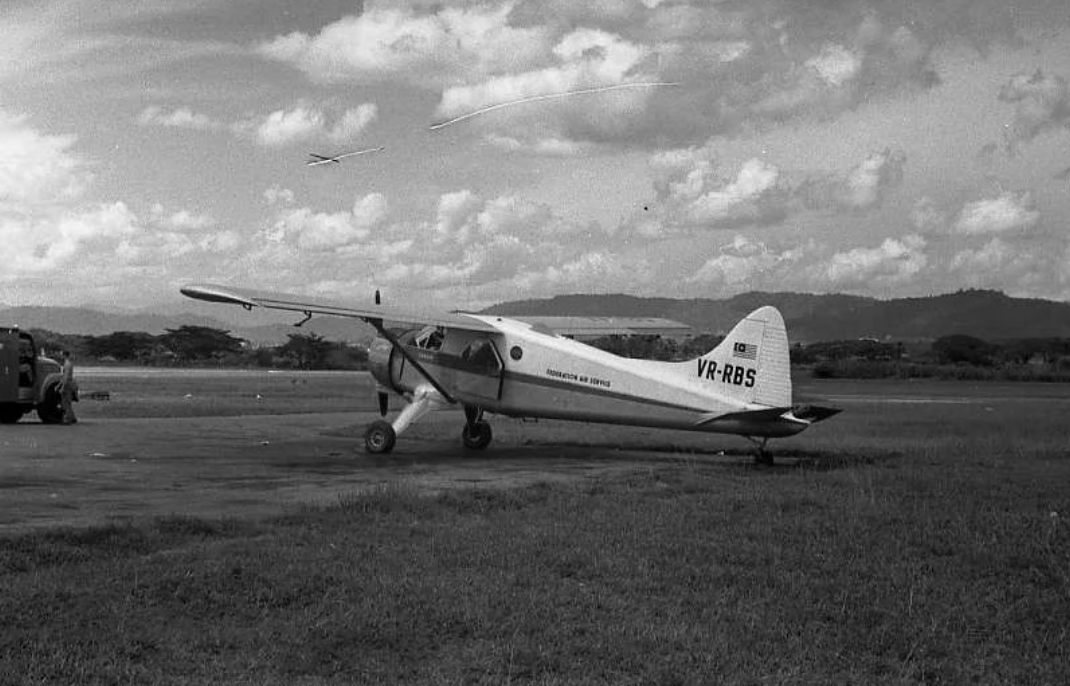
Federation Air Service de Havilland Canada Beaver

Malayan Airways regional subsidiaries for its Borneo and Malayan destinations.

Over the next few years, the airline expanded rapidly, boosted by postwar air travel demand when flying became more than a privilege for the rich and famous. By April 1960, the airline was operating Douglas DC-3s, Super Constellations and Viscounts on new routes from Singapore to Hong Kong, and from Kuala Lumpur to Bangkok via Penang. The airline also increased its frequencies from Singapore to cities on the British Borneo, including Brunei, Jesselton (now Kota Kinabalu), Kuching, Labuan, Sandakan, and Sibu.

With the delivery of an 84-seat Bristol Britannia in 1960, the airline launched its first long-haul international flight, to Hong Kong. When Malaya, Singapore, Sabah, and Sarawak formed Malaysia in September 1963, the airline's name was officially from "Malayan Airways" to "Malaysian Airways" concurrent with the arrival of five Fokker F27 in November 1963 (though still abbreviated to MAL). MAL also incorporated Borneo Airways, with the brand effectively merged under its parent company by 1 April 1965.

In 1966, following Singapore's separation from the federation, the airline's name was changed again, to Malaysia-Singapore Airlines (MSA). The next year had a rapid expansion in the airline's fleet and routes, including the purchase of MSA's first Boeing aircraft: the Boeing 707s, as well as completion of a new high-rise headquarters in Singapore. Boeing 737s were added to the fleet soon afterwards.

=== 1972–1997: Incorporation and international expansion ===
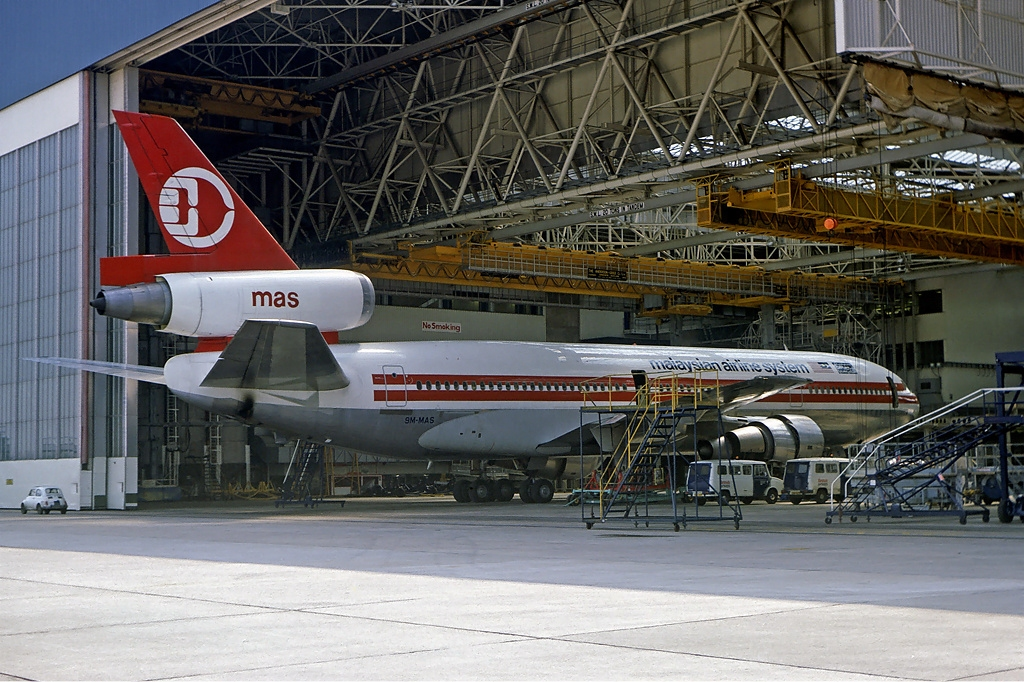
McDonnell Douglas DC-10, the first wide-bodied aircraft operated by the company

The differing needs of the two shareholders, however, led to the break-up of the airline just six years later. The Singapore government preferred to develop the airline's international routes, while the Malaysian government had no choice but to develop the domestic network first before going regional and eventually international. MSA ceased operations in 1972, with its assets split between two new airlines; Malaysian Airline System (MAS), and Singapore Airlines. With the Singapore government determined to develop its airlines' international routes, it took the entire fleet of seven Boeing 707s and five Boeing 737s, which would allow it to continue serving its regional and long-haul international routes. Since most of MSA's international routes were flown out of Singapore, most of the international routes were in the hands of Singapore Airlines. In addition, MSA's headquarters, which was located in Singapore, became the headquarters of that airline.

The initials MSA were well regarded as an airline icon, so both carriers tried to use them. Malaysian went for MAS by just transposing the last two letters and choosing the name Malaysian Airline System, while Singapore originally proposed the name Mercury Singapore Airlines to keep the MSA initials, but changed its mind and went for SIA instead. Acronyms for airline names later became less fashionable, and both carriers then moved on to their descriptive names.

Revenue passenger-kilometers, in millions
Year	Traffic
1975	1633
1979	2825
1981	4290
1990	11909
1995	22558
2000	37939

MAS took all domestic routes within Malaysia and international routes out of that country, as well as the remaining fleet of Fokker F27's. It began flights on 1 October 1972 with 19 aircraft and soon expanded, including introducing flights from Kuala Lumpur to London. In that year, MAS operated flights to more than 34 regional destinations and six international services. In 1976, after receiving its DC-10-30 aircraft, MAS scheduled flights to Europe, with initial flights from Kuala Lumpur to Amsterdam, Paris, and Frankfurt. The Boeing 707s were then removed from the fleet.

1980 sees the entry of the Airbus A300B4 fleet which were occasionally deployed to Asian and domestic routes and the addition of additional DC-10s onto the fleet. In 1982 the airline received its first Boeing 747-200 which was used as the carriers long haul flagship.

An economic boom in Malaysia during the 1980s spurred the growth of MAS. By the end of the decade, MAS was flying to 47 overseas destinations, including eight European destinations, seven Oceanian destinations, and American destinations of Los Angeles and Honolulu. In 1993, MAS reached South America when the airline received its first Boeing 747-400 aircraft. MAS became the first airline in Southeast Asia to fly to South America using its Boeing 747 via stopovers in South Africa. MAS also flew to Mexico City for a brief period from 1994 to 1998, with fifth freedom rights to transport passengers from Los Angeles en route from Kuala Lumpur (with a stopover in Tokyo-Narita.)

Further expansion in the fleet were executed by the airline in the 1990s with the short term leasing of the MD-11 fleet from World Airways. The airline has also begun replacing its Boeing 737-200 and Fokker 27 fleet with the addition of the Boeing 737-400, Boeing 737-500 and Fokker 50. In 1995 the airline received its Airbus A330-300 which effectively replaced the Airbus A300B4 and DC-10-30. A small number of its MD-11, DC-10s and Boeing 747-200 were converted and transferred to its air cargo division Maskargo.

The late 1990s saw MAS' final widebody fleet modernization with the first Boeing 777-200ER aircraft, brand new at the time. This aircraft then became MAS' primary long-haul and medium-haul routes.

=== 1997–2005: Financial crisis ===
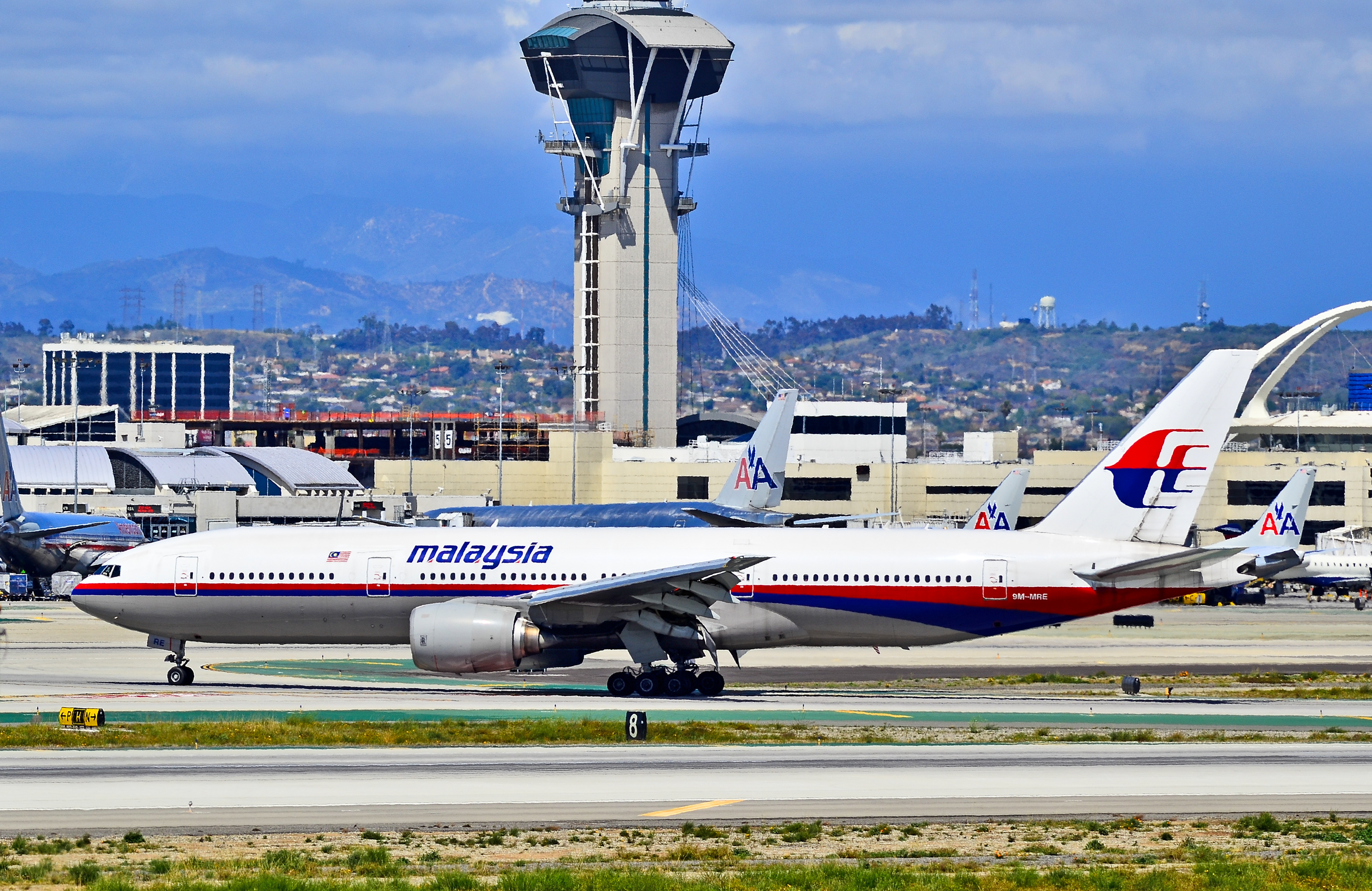
Malaysia Airlines Boeing 777 at Los Angeles International Airport

Prior to the Asian financial crisis in 1997, the airline suffered losses of as much as RM260 million after earning a record-breaking RM333 million profit in the financial year 1996/1997. The airline then introduced measures to bring it back to profitable. For the financial year 1999/2000, the airline cut its losses from RM700 million in 1998/1999 to RM259 million.

The airline plunged into further losses in the following years, however, amounting to RM417 million for the financial year 2000/2001 and RM836 million for the financial year 2001/2002. With these losses, the airline cut many unprofitable routes, such as Brussels, Darwin, Madrid, Munich, and Vancouver. The airline recovered from its losses the following year, achieving its then-highest profit, totalling RM461 million.

In the same year, MAS proceeded with its order of 6 Airbus A380 aircraft to envision a solution for the slot constraints the airline faced with few European routes and to maximise its presence on the kangaroo route.

In 2005, MAS suffered yet another period of unprofitability, reporting a loss of RM1.3 billion. Revenue for the financial period was up by 10.3% or RM826.9 million, compared to the same period for 2004, driven by a 10.2% growth in passenger traffic. International passenger revenue increased by RM457.6 million or 8.4%, to RM5.9 billion, while cargo revenue decreased by RM64.1 million or 4.2%, to RM1.5 billion. Costs increased by 28.8% or RM2.3 billion, amounting to a total of RM 10.3 billion, primarily due to escalating fuel prices. Other cost increases included staff costs, handling and landing fees, aircraft maintenance and overhaul charges, widespread assets unbundling charges, and leases.

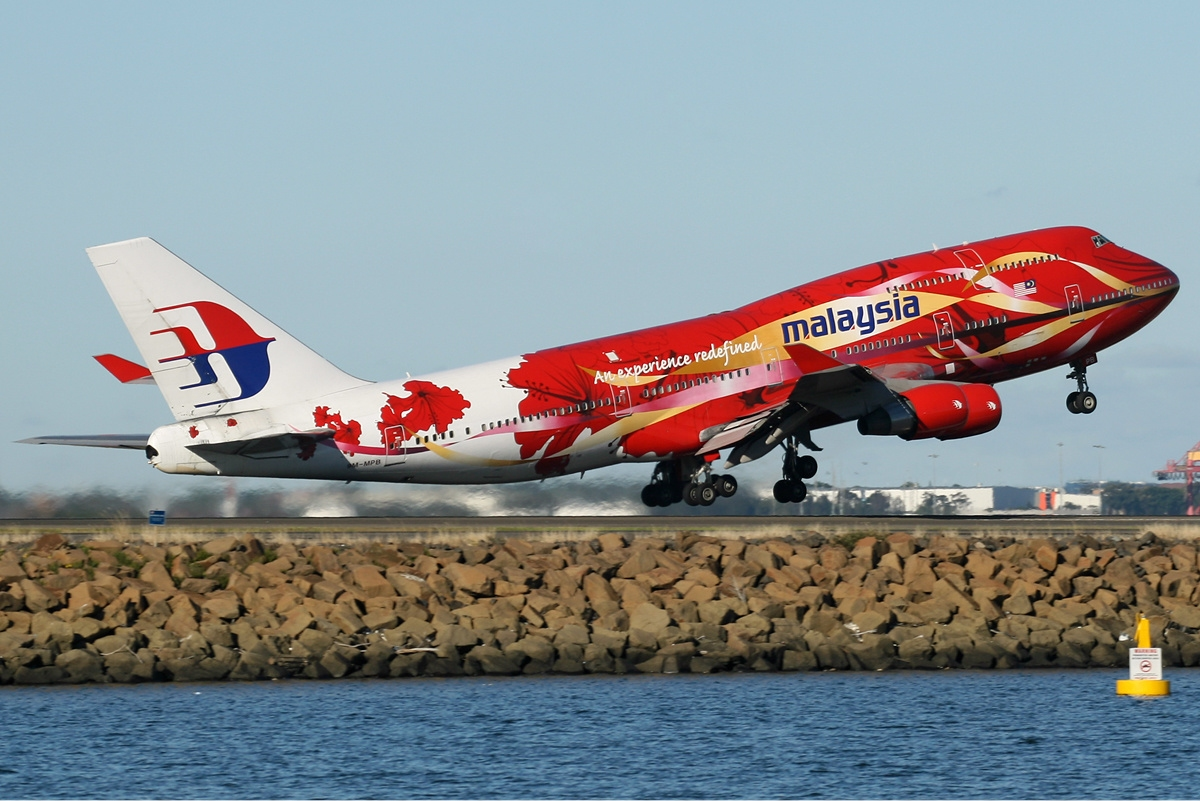
Malaysia Airlines Boeing 747-400 Hibiscus Livery in Sydney, 2007

The Malaysian government then appointed Idris Jala as the new CEO of MAS on 1 December 2005, to execute changes in operations and corporate culture. Several weaknesses in airline operations were identified as the causes of the RM1.3 billion loss. The most substantial factor in the losses was fuel costs. For the period, the total fuel cost was RM3.5 billion, representing a 40.4% increase compared to the same period in 2004. Total fuel cost increases comprised RM977.8 million due to higher fuel prices and another RM157.6 million due to additional consumption. In the third quarter, fuel costs were RM1.26 billion, compared to the RM1.01 billion in the corresponding period in 2004, resulting in a 24.6% increase or RM249.3 million.

Another factor for the losses was poor revenue management. MAS substantially lagged its peers on yield. Some of this gap was due to differences in traffic mix, with less business traffic to and from Malaysia than to and from Singapore, but much of it was due to weaknesses in pricing and revenue management, sales and distribution, brand presence in foreign markets, and alliance base. Moreover, MAS had one of the lowest labour costs per available seat kilometre (ASK) at US$0.41, compared to other airlines such as Cathay Pacific and Singapore Airlines at $0.59 and S$0.60, respectively. Despite low labour costs, however, the ratio of ASK revenue to this cost was, at 2.8, much lower than Singapore Airlines, where the ratio is 5.0, and slightly higher than Thai Airways Other factors were listed in the later-revealed business turnaround plan (BTP) of Malaysia Airlines, all leading to the net loss of RM1.3 billion in 2005.

=== 2006–2010: Recovery from unprofitability ===
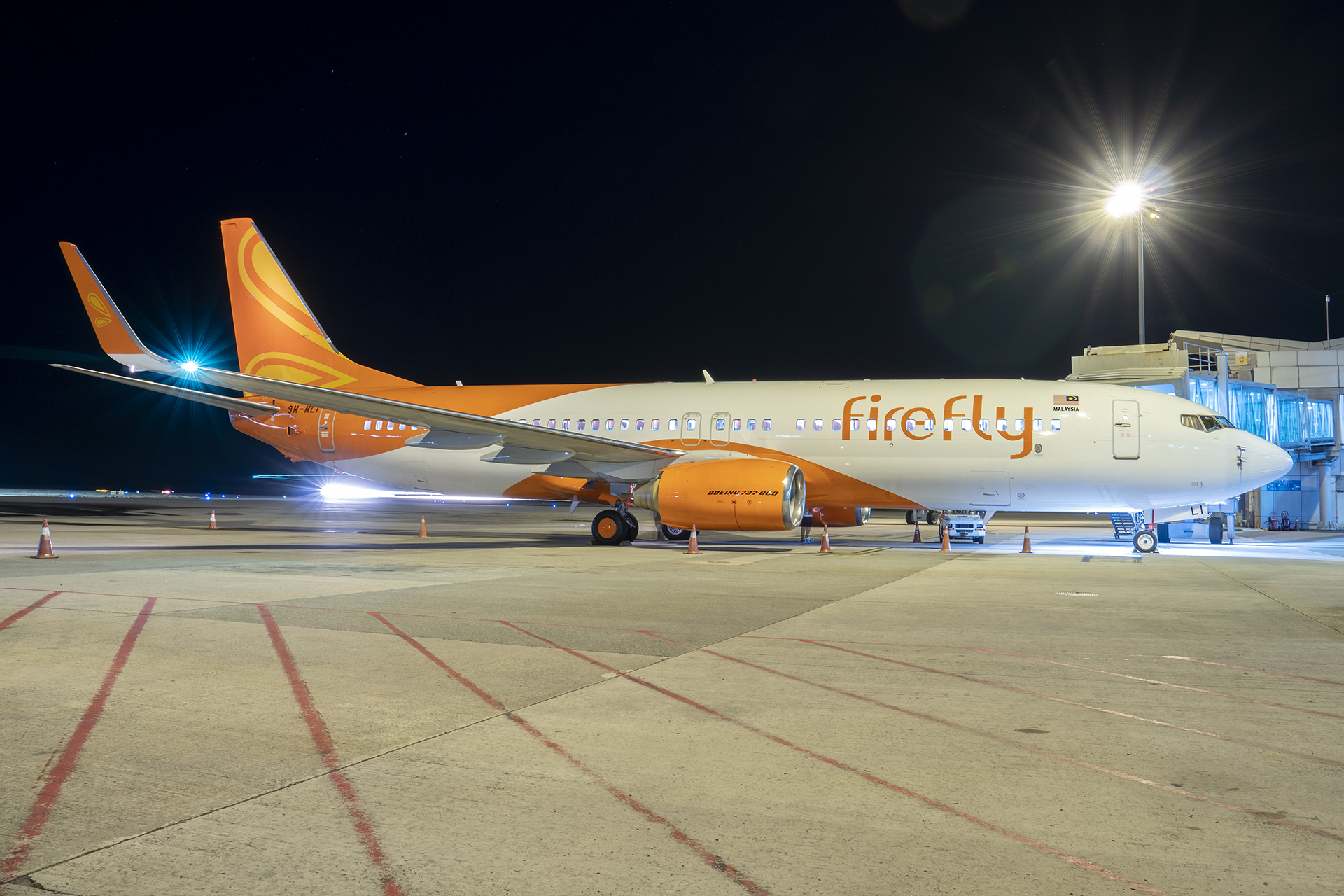
Firefly

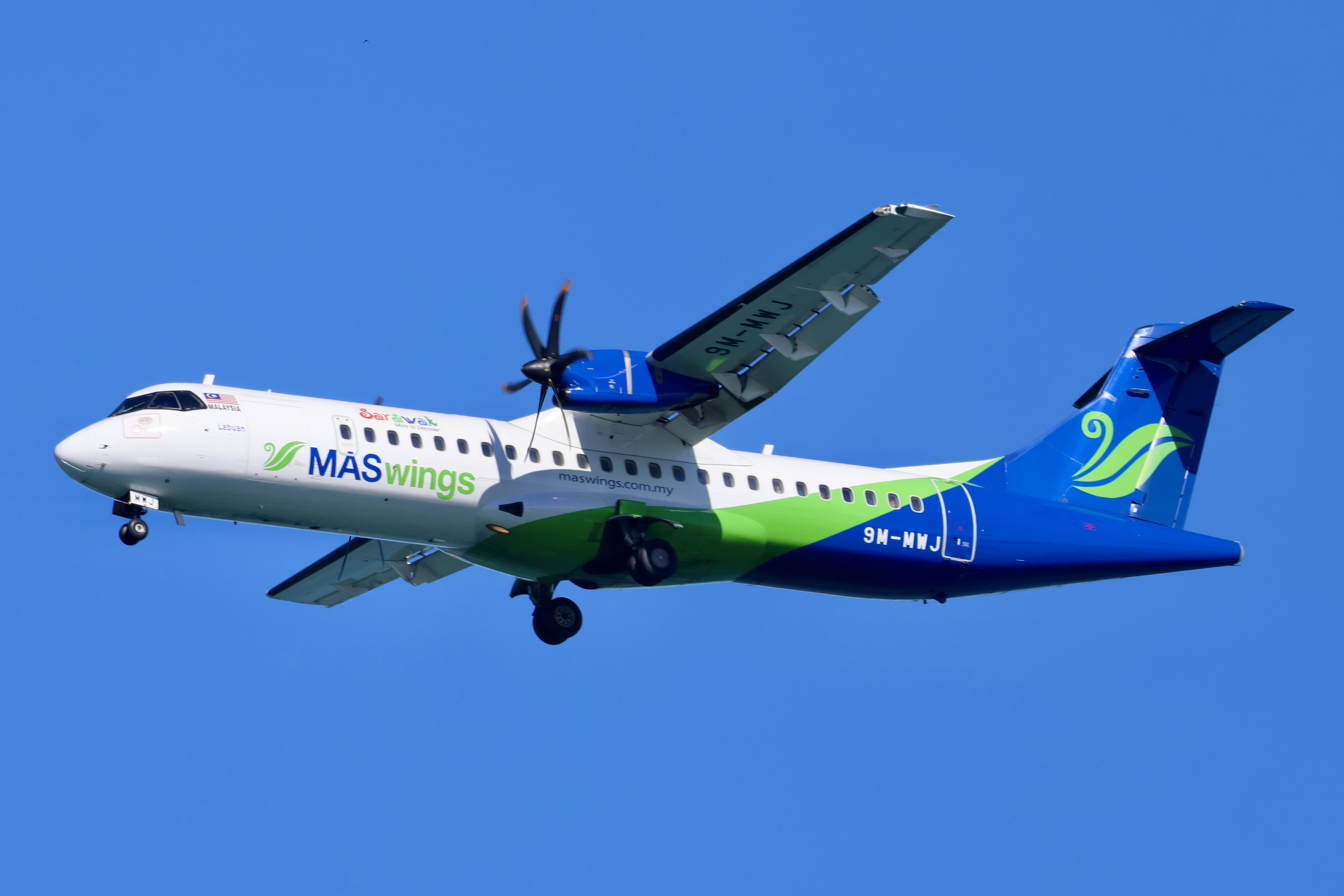
MASwings

In 2007, Malaysia Airlines established two subsidiaries: Firefly, which now operates as a low-cost carrier and MASwings (later acquired by Sarawak Government and rebranded as AirBorneo), which focuses on rural air services. In 2019, Malaysia Airlines also launched Amal, a subsidiary specializing in Hajj and Umrah travel.

Under the leadership of Idris Jala, MAS launched its BTP (Business Turnaround Plan) in 2006, developed using the Government-linked Company Transformation Manual as a guide. Under the various initiatives, launched together with the BTP, Malaysia Airlines switched from losses to profitability between 2006 and 2007. When the BTP came to an end, the airline posted a record profit of RM853 million (US$265 million) in 2007, ending a series of losses since 2005. The result exceeded the target of RM300 million by 184%.

Route rationalising was also the major contributors to the airline's return to profitability. MAS pared its domestic routes from 114 to 23, and also cancelled virtually all unprofitable international routes. It has handed off its turboprop fleet to airasia which was then tasked to handle the rural air service. It also rescheduled all of its flight timings and changed its operations model from point-to-point services to hub-and-spoke services. Additionally, the airline started Project Omega and Project Alpha to improve the company's network and revenue management. Emphasis has been placed on six areas - pricing, revenue management, network scheduling, opening storefronts, low-season strategy, and distribution management. MAS then pushed for new aircraft purchases, using its cash surplus of RM5.3 billion to eventually purchase new narrow- and wide-body aircraft. The first of such aircraft purchases were the order of 55 Boeing 737-800 which were meant to effectively replaced the airlines ageing Boeing 737-400.

In 2007 the airline took back east Malaysia's rural air service (RAS) operation and former turboprop aircraft which were then crippled by Airasia's subsidiary Fly Asian Express due to its inexperience. Malaysia airlines instead launched its own subsidiary MASwings to handle the rural air service and Firefly to start commercial operations in Subang airport. Malaysia Airlines former Fokker 50's were gradually replaced by the airlines order of ATR-72-500 from the year 2008 onwards.

Due to Idris Jala's appointment to the cabinet in August 2009, Tengku Azmil Zahruddin took over as the airline's new CEO. In December that year, MAS announced the purchase of 15 new Airbus A330 aircraft, with options for another 10. Expected to be delivered between 2011 and 2016, they are intended to operate on medium-haul routes to eastern Asia, Australia, and the Middle East. The airline's plans are to run the Airbus A380 planes, which were then introduced into service in 2012, on long-haul routes along with the Boeing 777s, the A330s on medium-haul routes, and Boeing 737 aircraft on short-haul routes.

=== 2011–2014: Third unprofitability, 2014 aircraft losses, bankruptcy ===
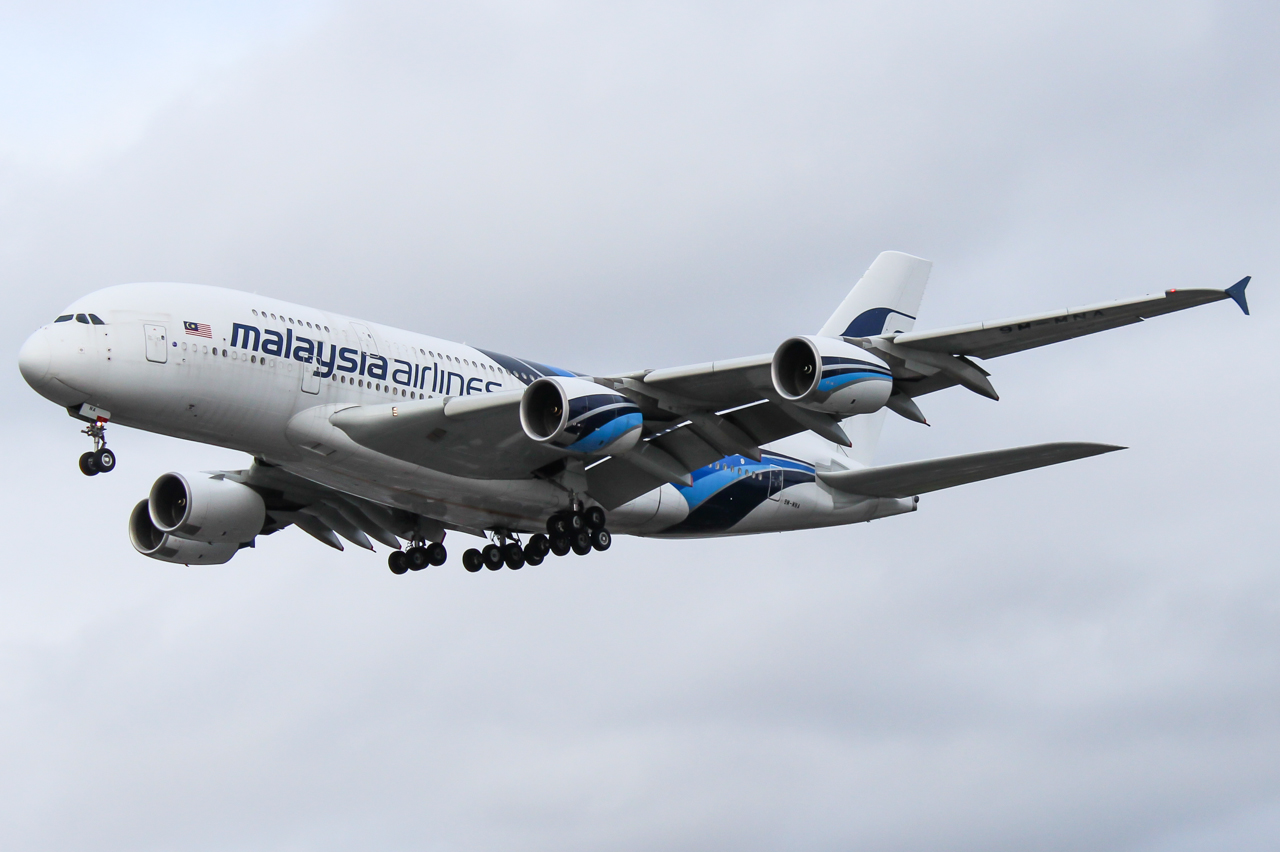
A former Malaysia Airlines Airbus A380-800, which entered the fleet in 2012.

MAS recorded a net loss of RM2.52 billion in 2011, which was the largest in its company history, due to rising fuel costs. A major restructuring led to the appointment of a new CEO, Ahmad Jauhari Yahya, in September 2011. One of the first initiatives to stop the losses was a rationalisation of the network. The company suspended services to Surabaya, Karachi, Dubai, Dammam and Johannesburg.

With the delivery of the Airbus A380-800, the airline has also begun to retire its remaining Boeing 747-400s in 2012. Also retired were the older generation Airbus A330s and Boeing 737-400s by the end of 2014.

In February 2013, MAS reported a net profit of RM51.4 million for the fourth quarter. The airline's improved financial performance that year was mainly attributable to its route rationalisation programme, which had an overall 8% reduction in ASK. This was matched by a marginal 1% reduction in revenue to RM13.76bil in 2012 and seat factor holding at 74.5%. The reduced ASK also helped MAS register a corresponding 14% decrease in expenditures.

The airline struggled to cut costs to compete with a wave of new, low-cost carriers in the region. The airline lost RM443.4 million (US$137.4 million) in the first quarter of 2014. The second quarter—the first in the aftermath of the disappearance of Flight 370 – had a loss of RM307.04 million (US$97.6 million), which represented a 75% increase over losses from second-quarter 2013. As a result, MAS has not made a profit since 2010. In the previous three years, the airline had booked losses of RM1.17 billion ($356 million) in 2013, RM433 million in 2012, and RM2.5 billion in 2011. Industry analysts expect MAS to lose further market share and face a challenging environment to stand out from competitors while addressing their financial plight. The company's stock, down as much as 20% following the disappearance of Flight 370, had fallen 80% over the previous five years, which contrasts with a rise in the Malaysian stock market of about 80% over the same period. A month after the disappearance, CEO Ahmad Jauhari Yahya acknowledged that ticket sales had declined, but did not provide details. This may have partially resulted from the suspension of the airline's advertising campaigns following the disappearance. In China, where the majority of Flight 370 victims were from, bookings on Malaysia Airlines were down 60% in March. He said he was not sure when the airline could start repairing its image, but that the airline was adequately insured to cover the financial loss stemming from the incident. In August, the airline warned of poor second-half earnings, citing a 33% decline in average weekly bookings following the loss of Flight 17. Media reported that some flights were largely empty and that the airline had slashed prices well below competitors on several key routes.

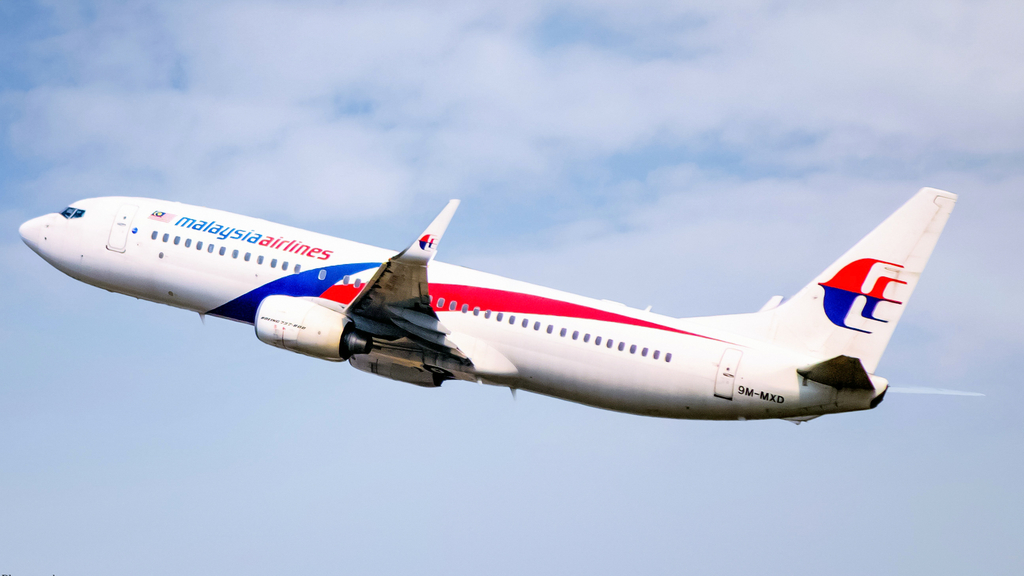
Malaysia Airlines Boeing 737-800 sporting the 2010-2017 livery

Prior to the shootdown of Flight 17, many analysts and the media suggested that Malaysia Airlines would need to rebrand and repair its image and/or require government assistance to return to profitability. On 8 August, trading in the company's stock was temporarily suspended when Khazanah Nasional—the majority shareholder (69.37%) and a Malaysian state-run investment arm—requested that MAS' Board of Directors undertake a selective capital reduction exercise (e.g. buyback or cancel stock of other shareholders); Khazanah announced it will spend RM1.38 billion (US$431 million; 27 sen per share) to compensate minority shareholders (a 12.5% premium of 7 August closing price). At the time, Khazanah Nasional did not announce much about its plans for the airline except that the airline had "substantial funding requirements" and that a "comprehensive review and restructuring" was needed.

On 29 August, Khazanah released a report, "Rebuilding a National Icon: The MAS Recovery Plan", which outlines their plan for the restructuring of MAS and the process of completing the takeover. About 6,000 jobs (about 30% of MAS's workforce) will be eliminated and the carrier's route network will be shrunk to focus on regional destinations rather than unprofitable long-haul routes. Khazanah had plans to delist the airline from Malaysia's stock exchange by the end of 2014 and to return it to profitability by late 2017, relisting the airline by 2018 or 2019. On the business/legal side, Khazanah intended to transfer the relevant operations, assets, and liabilities of Malaysian Airline System Berhad into a new company (no name given in documents) by July 2015.

=== 2015–2020: Renationalisation, restructuring, and rebranding ===
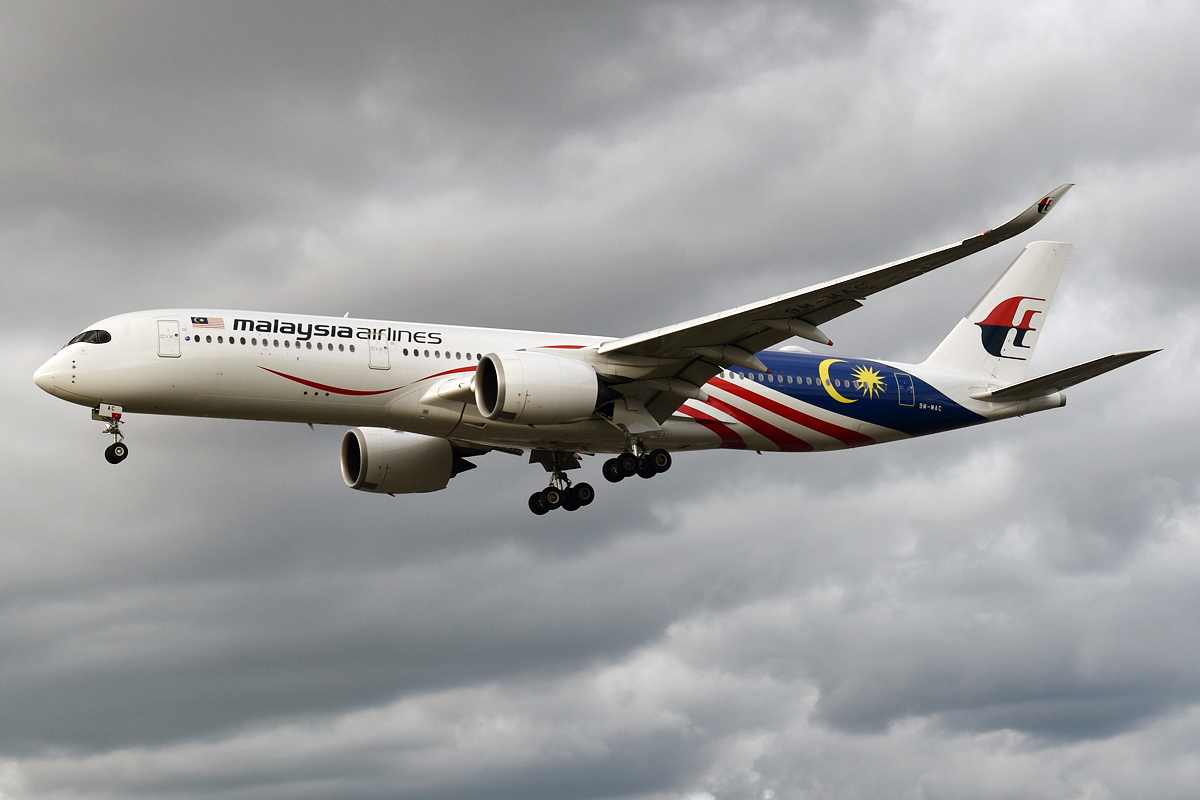
A Malaysia Airlines Airbus A350-900 spotting the current livery in use since 2017.

In January 2015, the airline was declared "technically bankrupt". In May 2015, it was announced that the airline would be transferred to a newly founded Malaysia Airlines Berhad (MAB) by 1 September 2015, with the rebranding of the airline also commencing the same day. The new company commanded a heavily reduced workforce and adjusted route network with a focus on Asia, according to its newly appointed CEO, Christoph Mueller. He also announced that Malaysia Airlines would be putting two of its Airbus A380s up for sale.

Four months later, MAB announced that they would add four new Airbus A350-900 aircraft to their fleet from the end of 2017 to the middle of 2018. The aircraft were to be leased from Air Lease Corporation. The airline also expected to add two more A350-900 and two Airbus A330-900 aircraft in the future. MAB then announced that it was set to undergo a brand overhaul involving a new name, logo and livery for its aircraft, with the changes to be unveiled on an unspecified date.

The airline has also started the retirement of the Boeing 777-200 fleet, with the last aircraft leaving in the year 2016. The route renationalisation and trimming of many long haul routes had made the aircraft inefficient to be deployed on the airline's medium haul routes, which were then already served by the Airbus A330-300.

In January 2016, the airline introduced a policy of not serving alcohol on flights of less than three hours. While the move was unpopular with many travellers, the airline stated that its actions were in response to the preference of the majority of customers.

In April 2016, CEO Christoph Mueller resigned from his post after less than a year of leading the carrier's reorganisation efforts, citing "changing personal circumstances." Mueller initially planned to continue as CEO until September 2016 and stay on the airline's board as a nonexecutive director to oversee the transition to a new CEO. It was announced that Peter Bellew would become the new chief with effect from 1 July 2016, effectively shortening Mueller's tenure by a further two months.

In April 2017, Malaysia Airlines announced that the airline's entire fleet would be tracked with the satellite flight-tracking system.

In October 2017, an unexpected announcement was made involving Malaysia Airlines CEO Peter Bellew's return to Ryanair as chief operations officer to help fix pilot problems. Bellew had worked as a flight operations director at Ryanair until 2014. Bellew's decision to leave Malaysia Airlines came just over a year after former chief executive Christoph Mueller left the airline, citing personal circumstances after being hired on a three-year mission to revive the state-controlled firm. The appointment of Mueller's replacement, Captain Izham Ismail, who served as the airline's chief operating officer prior to the appointment, was announced a few days later.

November 2017 saw the arrival of the Airbus A350 and Airbus A330-200 which were leased onto the fleet. The brand new Airbus A350s were essentially used to replace the Airbus A380 on the airline's small long haul route network while the second hand Airbus A330-200 were deployed as interim aircraft for certain medium to long haul routes. With this the A380s were instead deployed to Narita and Seoul.

In 2019 the airline launched Project Amal (Hope) which was a special hajj umrah charter for Muslim pilgrims utilising the airline's fleet of Airbus A380 aircraft.

=== 2020–2025: COVID-19 pandemic, fourth unprofitability, turnaround, and ongoing management crisis ===
On 6 April 2020, the Malaysian private equity firm Golden Skies Ventures reportedly made an offer of US$2.5 billion to take over Malaysia Airlines during the COVID-19 pandemic. The pandemic also resulted in the airline grounding most of its Boeing 737 aircraft.

In October 2020, during the COVID-19 pandemic, Malaysia Airlines needed about RM1 billion of capital annually if the government intended to sustain its operations under the current structure. The airline also decided to retire and return all 6 of its grounded Airbus A380 aircraft to Airbus in 2023 as the viability to operate the double decker fleet became difficult as grounding persisted.

In 2022, the airline improved its financial margin through restructuring. It switched a majority of its passenger aircraft in year of Q2 2020 to Q1 2022 into cargo flights, leveraging on its ability to support the disrupted supply chain system in Asia. The Airline also undertook multiple foreign repatriation missions, transporting stranded citizens back to their home countries along with flying medical equipment and vaccines. In the same year, the airline reported a net profit of RM1.15 billion in the fourth quarter of 2022 with its total net loss reduced to RM344 million from RM1.65 billion a year ago.

In 2023, as a result of positive cash flow, Malaysia's sovereign wealth fund Khazanah Nasional Berhad decided it would hold on to its sole ownership of the airline until further notice. Credit lines predicted to alleviate the airline's burden were also underutilised in year 2021–2022. The sovereign fund planned to reduce its stakes on Malaysia Airlines and to allow the airline to seek strategic partnership with an international operator post 2025.

In August 2023, the airline experienced issues with its primary inflight caterer BRAHIM in Kuala Lumpur International Airport. Contract disputes since the pandemic had brought both parties to non agreeable terms in regards to renewal. As a result, the airline halted a majority of its inflight hot meal services in September for flights originating from Kuala Lumpur. The airline has since reintegrated hot meal services from various caterers by stages and had restored most of them by November.

In November 2023, the airline has stated that it expects to reach full net profit for the whole year of 2023 with full break even in its entirety. The airline cited improved yields, balanced sheets and a constant positive cash flow as a result of its restructuring efforts along with the return of global travel demand post pandemic. The airline has also began recommitting its narrowbody and widebody aircraft renewal program.

In March 2024, Malaysia Aviation Group has confirmed that Malaysia Airlines and its subsidiaries has reached full net profit for year 2023. A profit after tax and interest (NIAT) of RM766 million was announced over year 2022 net loss of RM344 million.

Since August 2024, Malaysia Airlines faces criticism and trust lost over its management, which caused multiple technical issues, safety concerns and alleged staff poaching. The managing director of the group Datuk Captain Izham bin Ismail has criticized the Aviation industry's original equipment manufacturers (OEMs) for global parts shortage and poor quality control of aircraft parts. The airline also faced significant delays involving aircraft deliveries from both Airbus and Boeing. The airline was originally scheduled to receive 4 Airbus A330neo and 9 Boeing 737 MAX by Q4 2024 but the airline has only received 5 from Boeing and 1 from Airbus in total. The delays has resulted in setbacks involving network strategy and planned aircraft renewal. The incumbent prime minister, Datuk Seri Anwar Ibrahim stated that the act of buying 30 Boeing Planes showed that the airlines was in healthy financial performance and effective management recently.

In February 2025, the airline has cautioned that it is operating back in the red for year 2024. This is due to ongoing staff attrition and OEM supply chain issues which has resulted in the airline having to cut back 18% of its scheduled flights from August to December 2024. Malaysia Aviation Group has announced that for FY 2024, Malaysia Airlines and its subsidiaries have recorded a small net profit of RM54mil, its third consecutive year of positive operating results.

In May 2025, Malaysia Airlines signed several agreements with Air Promotion Group (APG), Student Universe, and Advanced Travel Partners International (ATPI), and the agreements are part of the airline's ongoing efforts to enhance market reach, deliver greater value to its diverse customer base, and strengthen its global distribution and commercial presence. This agreements supposedly give a broader access towards the offline, student travellers and also marine markets respectively.

In July 2025, partnerships of collaboration with the Singapore Airlines on the SIN-KUL route had been approved. This cooperation would saw that two airlines work together on various areas of their businesses, including scheduling, pricing, sales and marketing, and other commercial areas. These agreements also stated that both airlines must fulfilled their existence capacity, only increased the capacity to achieve certain performance goals and reported any changes happen towards independent auditors for the compliance.

In September 2025, Malaysia Aviation Group announced that first half net income after taxes (NIAT) increased by 39% in the first half of 2025. This growth was driven by the driven by a stronger ringgit, favourable fuel prices and improved operational efficiency from its newer fleet. Their operational performances also rose from 71.9% at the start of 2025 to 87.3% in July, while its customer satisfaction index improved from 80% in 2024 to 83% year to date in 2025. This growth allowed the expansion of network for the main fleet back to Chengdu and for the low cost arm, Firefly to several ASEAN destinations which was announced at the 2025 Matta Fair.

Besides the expansion on China market. Malaysia Airlines successfully flied over 1.3 million passengers on India routes in the first half of 2025. This occurrence allowed India as the number one source of revenue for the airlines, over Australia and Europe. A good performance for the first half gave several awards to Malaysia Airlines such as the APEX four star airlines awards and the ninth best airlines rated by the Condé Nast Traveller UK Readers' Choice Awards 2025.

In November 2025, Malaysia Aviation Group announced that the CEO, Izham Ismail would retire as the MAG CEO effective 31 January 2026. Izham would be replaced by Nasaruddin Bakar as president and group CEO, a new designation succeeding the role of managing director.

In December 2025, Malaysia Aviation Group set up a goal for becoming the top Skytrax's Top 10 Global Airlines by 2030 by announcing the Long Term Business Plan 3.0 (LTBP3.0). This plan would be realized through four pillars which are the continuation of fleet renewal and expansion to 116 aircraft by 2030, deepen partnerships for the global reach extension, reinforced operational leadership by upskilling the new talent and adopting the best-in-class practices across the group, and built greater financial resilience by expanding third-party businesses such as cargo and in-flight catering.

=== 2026: New long term business plan and new leadership at helm ===
The first major moves that Malaysia Airlines struck in January 2026 would be the partnership with a cricket team, Mumbai Indians. This move was seeing as an expansion move towards the South Asian markets internationally whilst tapping into the connections of cricket cultures and tourisms. This initiative would fulfill one of the pillars said in the Long Term Business Plan (global reach) and also synergized with the increasing demand of tourism due to the 2026 Visit Malaysia Campaign.

As Nasaruddin took charge as the new group CEO, Malaysia Aviation Group also announced that Bryan Foong, the current group chief strategy officier would be promoted to oversee MAG's airline business whilst his old position being passed on to Low Wen Long.

== Corporate affairs ==
=== Head office ===
Malaysia Airlines has its headquarters and registered office on the first floor of Administration Building, South Support Zone at Kuala Lumpur International Airport, Sepang, in the Klang Valley region.

Previously the airline headquarters were on the third floor of the MAS Administrative Complex at Subang Airport, in Subang. Prior to the construction of the Kuala Lumpur MAS headquarters, the airline rented space in the UMBC headquarters. The airline had a permanent corporate headquarters in the Bangunan MAS, a 34-story building it owned along Jalan Sultan Ismail. In 2005 The Star said that the building was "reported to be worth between RM300mil and RM350mil."

In 2006, the airline moved its head office from the Kuala Lumpur building to the former headquarters in Subang. Channel News Asia stated that the airline had been "forced" to sell the former headquarters.

In 2010, Permodalan Nasional Berhad purchased Bangunan MAS from the airline. The new owners planned to remodel the building, by installing a five-star hotel apartment block and upgrade the offices to Grade A++.

=== Subsidiaries ===
Some of the subsidiaries include:

Company	Type	Principal activities	Incorporated in	Group's equity shareholding
Malaysia Airlines Cargo Sdn. Bhd	Subsidiary	Cargo	Malaysia	100%
GE Engine Services Malaysia	Associate	Engine Overhaul	Malaysia	30%
Firefly Sdn. Bhd.	Subsidiary	Airline	Malaysia	100%
MAB Engineering	Subsidiary	Maintenance Repair and Operations (MRO)	Malaysia	100%
Malaysian Aerospace Engineering Sdn Bhd	Subsidiary	Maintenance Repair and Operations (MRO)	Malaysia	55.39%
MAB Academy (MABA)	Subsidiary	Training Centre	Malaysia	100%
Abacus Distribution Systems (Malaysia) Sdn Bhd	Subsidiary	Computer reservation system	Malaysia	80%
Taj Madras Flight Kitchen Limited	Associate	Catering	India	20%
MAS Awana Services Sdn Bhd	Subsidiary	Catering and cabin handling services	Malaysia	60%
AeroDarat Services Sdn Bhd	Subsidiary	Ground Handling	Malaysia	100%
Brahim's Airline Catering, formerly known as LSG Sky Chefs	Associate	Catering, cabin handling and cleaning services	Malaysia	30%

=== Financial highlights ===
Malaysia Airlines experienced a RM1.25 billion loss in 2005. In 2006, the Business Turnaround Plan was introduced to revive the airline. At the end of the airline's turnaround program, in financial year 2007, Malaysia Airlines gained RM851 million net profit: a swing of RM987 million compared to RM134 million in losses in 2006, marking the national carrier's highest-ever profit in its sixty-year history. The achievement was recognised as the world's best airline-turnaround story in 2007, with Malaysia Airlines being awarded the Phoenix award by Penton Media's Air Transport World.

Malaysia Airlines financial highlights
Year ended	Revenue (RM '000)	Expenditure (RM '000)	Profit/(Loss) after tax (RM '000)	Shareholders fund (RM '000)	EPS after tax (cents)
31 March 2002	8,864,385	8,872,391	▲336,531	2,562,841	▲38.7
31 March 2003	8,780,820	8,591,157	▲461,143	3,023,984	▼36.8
31 March 2004	11,364,309	11,046,764	▼326,079	3,318,732	▼26.0
31 December 2005	9,181,338	10,434,634	▼(1,251,603)	2,009,857	▼(100.2)
31 December 2006	13,407,240	13,641,880	▲(133,737)	1,873,425	▲(10.9)
31 December 2007	15,232,741	14,404,400	▲852,743	3,934,893	▲58.1
31 December 2008	15,570,141	15,299,234	▼271,795	4,119,822	▼14.6
31 December 2009	11,605,511	12,288,452	▲522,948	699,693	▲25.3
31 December 2010	13,585,559	13,485,355	▲237,346	3,524,166	▲7.2
31 December 2011	13,901,421	16,485,693	▼(2,521,325)	1,042,508	▼(75.5)
31 December 2012	13,756,411	14,162,738	▼(430,738)	2,123,144	▼(6.1)
31 December 2013	15,121,204	16,314,775	▼(1,168,839)	4,033,923	▼(8.7)

=== Branding ===
From the late 1990s until 2007, Malaysia Airlines used the slogan "Going Beyond Expectations" to brand itself internationally. In 2008, the new branding strategy slogan became "More than just an airline code. MH is Malaysian Hospitality", to emphasise the hospitality of its cabin crew instead of the airline's network and cabin classes.

Since 2013, the airline has been using the slogan "Journeys are made by people you travel with". However, with the onset of Flight 370 and Flight 17, the airline has used a number of slogans including "#keepflying" and "#flyinghigh". A new slogan, "Malaysian Hospitality Begins With Us", was unveiled in 2018.

In 2024, Malaysia Airlines has begun to incorporate a new slogan, which is "Your Gateway to Asia and Beyond" that can be seen on its official website.

==== Corporate image ====
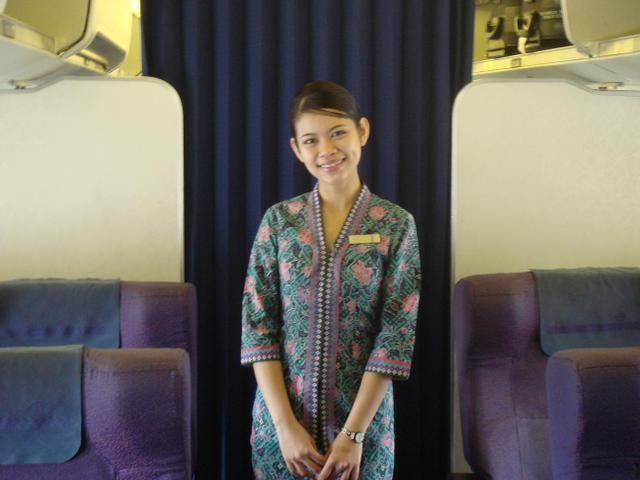
Malaysia Airlines flight attendant

Malaysia Airlines introduced the Sarong Kebaya design on 1 March 1986 for female flight attendants. It was designed by the School of Fashion at Mara Institute of Technology (Malay: Institut Teknologi Mara) and later known as Mara University of Technology (Malay: Universiti Teknologi Mara). The batik material depicts the "kelarai" motif, which is a bamboo weave pattern. It appears in the background in subdued hues of the basic uniform colour. Superimposed on the "kelarai" motif is a mixture of Malaysian flora, such as the cempaka, jasmine and the leaves of the hibiscus. The geometric Sarawakian motif is used for the lapels of the baju, edges of sleeves and the "sarong". In January 1993, the colours of the batik were enhanced to complement the colour of the new uniform. The male flight attendants wear grey colour jackets.

==== Corporate logo ====
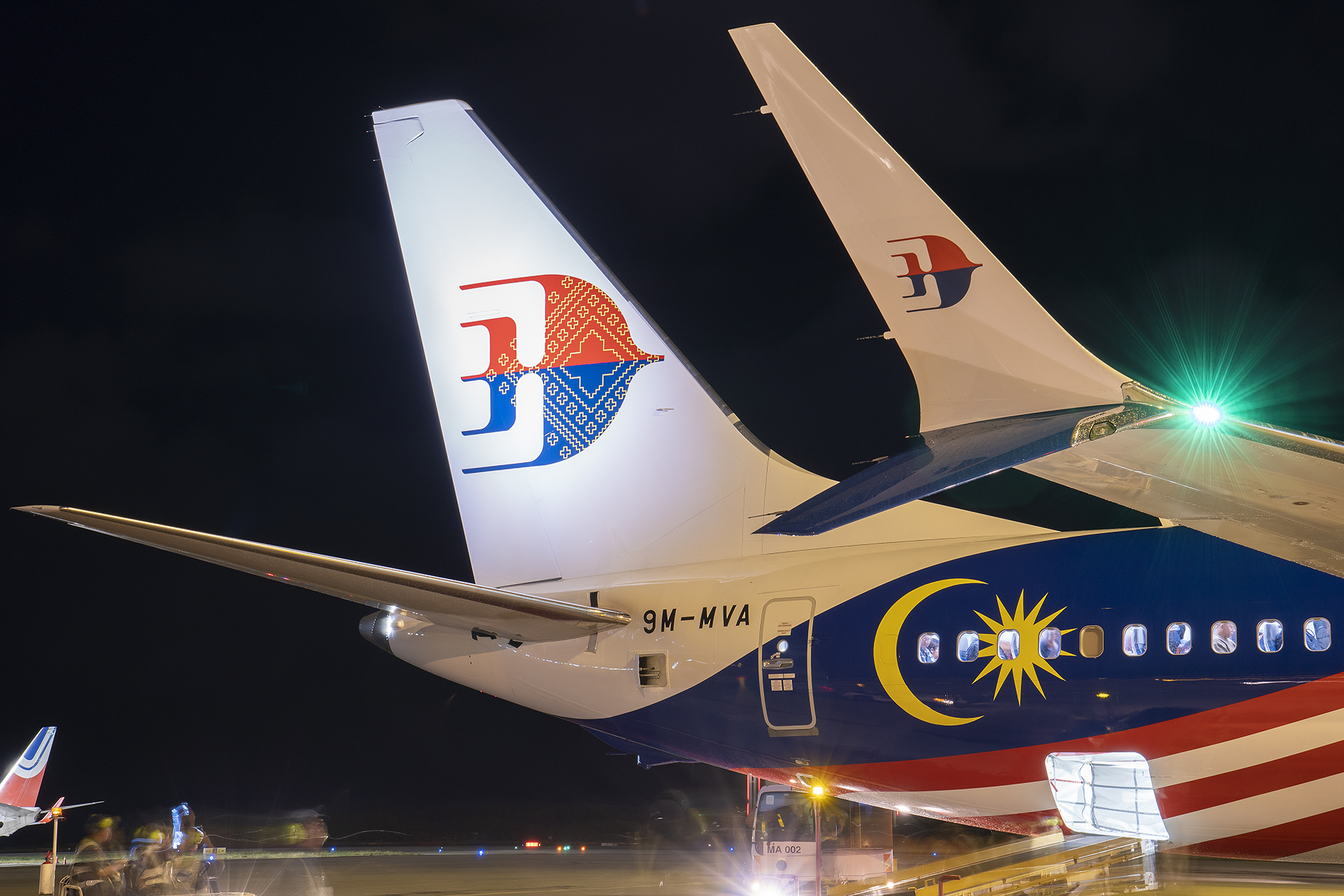
Malaysia Airlines latest logo introduced in 2023 with 2017 livery

The history of the airline started in 1937, when Malayan Airways Limited was registered as a company. Flying operations started in 1947, with the aircraft bearing the symbol of a winged tiger. A new logo was introduced with the formation of Malaysia-Singapore Airlines in 1966, featuring the initials of the airline's name, MSA.

In 1971, MSA split into two airlines, each with its own policies and objectives, leading to the birth of Malaysia's flag carrier, Malaysian Airline System (MAS). The name was chosen because, in abbreviated form, MAS (as in EMAS) in Malay means gold, to symbolise quality service. A corporate logo based on the wau bulan (moon kite) was eventually adopted in the following years.

A new corporate logo designed by Dato' Johan Ariff of Johan Design Associates was introduced on 15 October 1987, retaining the essence of the moon kite, now with a sheared swept-back look painted in red (top) and blue (bottom). Along with the new corporate logo, a new type style – MALAYSIA, was created. It is italicised to slant parallel with the logo to accentuate speed as well as direction. Within this corporate typestyle, the letters M, A and S bear red clippings to denote the initials of the statutory name of the airline, Malaysian Airline System (MAS). The introduction of blue to the original red logo has national significance.

Beginning 2010, all of Malaysia Airlines' new Airbus A330 and Boeing 737 aircraft sport the new standard airline livery featuring two strips of red and blue emerging from the bottom of the fuselage. The wau bulan on the tail was also refreshed. Although still featuring a sheared swept-back look with its colours in red and blue, its tails have been extended to appear twinned. Moreover, the airline's name on the fuselage is presented in full unlike before and it is entirely blue.

In 2012, the corporate logo of red and blue wau bulan was refreshed. The new wau bulan faces right, as it did in the original 1971 logo, and its tails have been extended. Initially, the airline settled for an all blue wau bulan but it has since reverted it to its red and blue form. The wordmark has also been modernised with a new typeface and the word "airlines" is now presented in lowercase. That same year, the airline also unveiled a new and exclusive livery for its Airbus A380 fleet to highlight the flagship carrier of the airline. It features an all-blue wau bulan on the tail and strip of blue ribbon on the fuselage and engines, the airline's name is entirely in blue as well. Also in the same year a special retro livery scheme was painted on one B737-800 9M-MXA. The aircraft sports a rendition of the 1970s Malaysia Airlines System paint scheme to commemorate the airlines 40 year anniversary. A Boeing 747-400 was also painted in the same retro scheme in 2016.

In 2017, the airline introduced its 'Negaraku' livery on one Boeing 737. Initially a special paint scheme on few selected aircraft, it is now in the process of being integrated as the standard livery across the entire fleet. This livery has the Malaysian flag painted across the aft section of the aircraft's fuselage and symbolizes Malaysia's rich heritage culture and also modifies the corporate wau bulan logo on the tail section of the aircraft.

In 2023, an updated rendition of the Negaraku livery was unveiled on the upcoming Airbus A330-900 by Airbus. The same updated paint scheme is also incorporated on the Boeing 737 MAX 8 fleet. The updated paint has the songket motif embedded on the wau bulan logo showcasing vibrant colors from Malaysia's traditional textiles. The airline also revised the corporate name font type appearance along with adjusting the wau bulan's angle.

=== Alliance ===
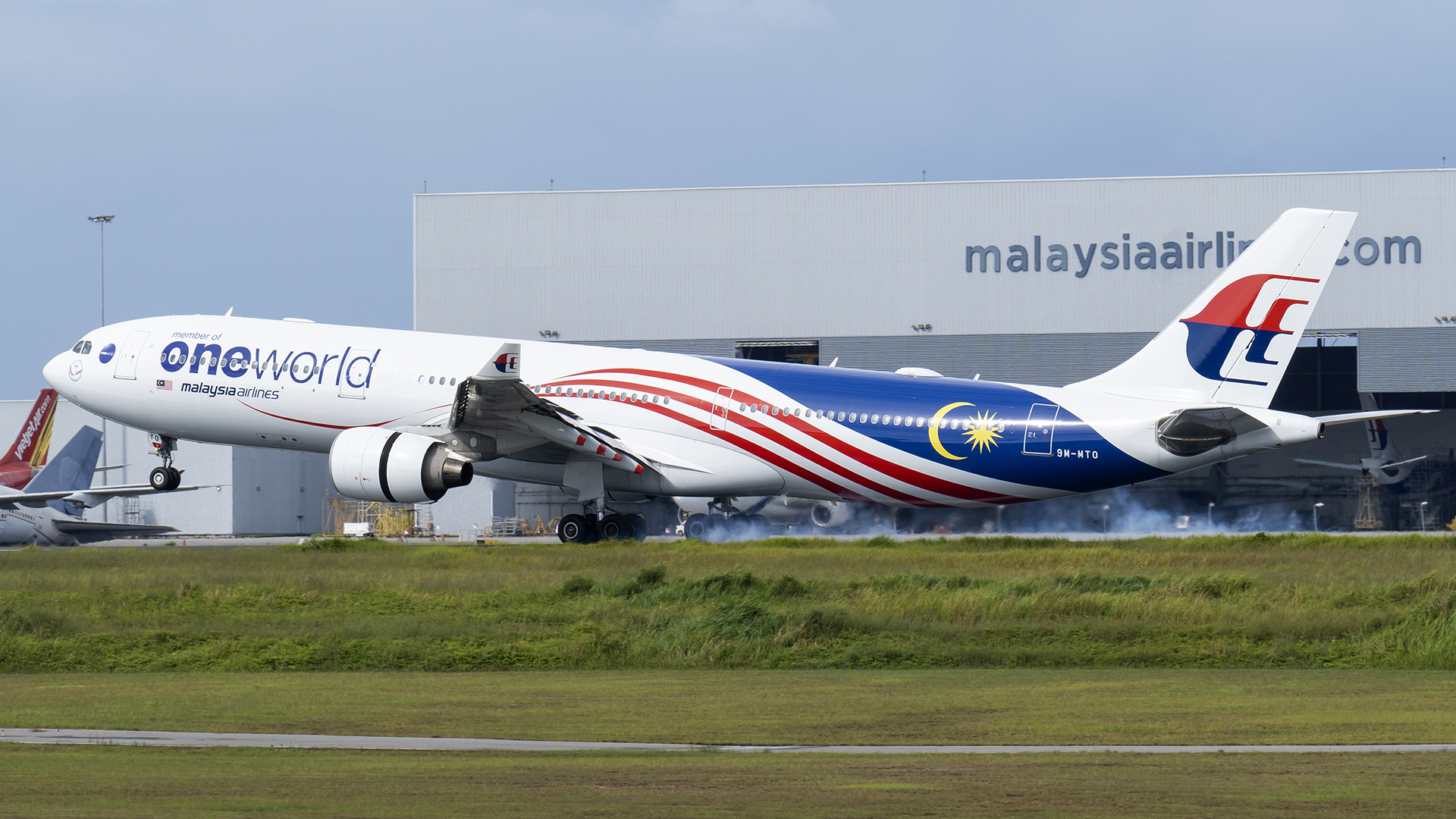
Malaysia Airlines A330-300 negaraku now in Oneworld Livery

In August 2011, Malaysia Airlines agreed to collaborate with AirAsia through a share swap. The share swap between Malaysia Airlines' major shareholder and that of AirAsia was later undone in May 2012 due to resistance from certain quarters of its staff.

On 1 February 2013, Malaysia Airlines became a member of the Oneworld alliance, thus adding 16 new destinations into the alliance's map. Malaysia Airlines would now be able to fly its passengers to over 842 destinations across 156 countries.

== Destinations ==
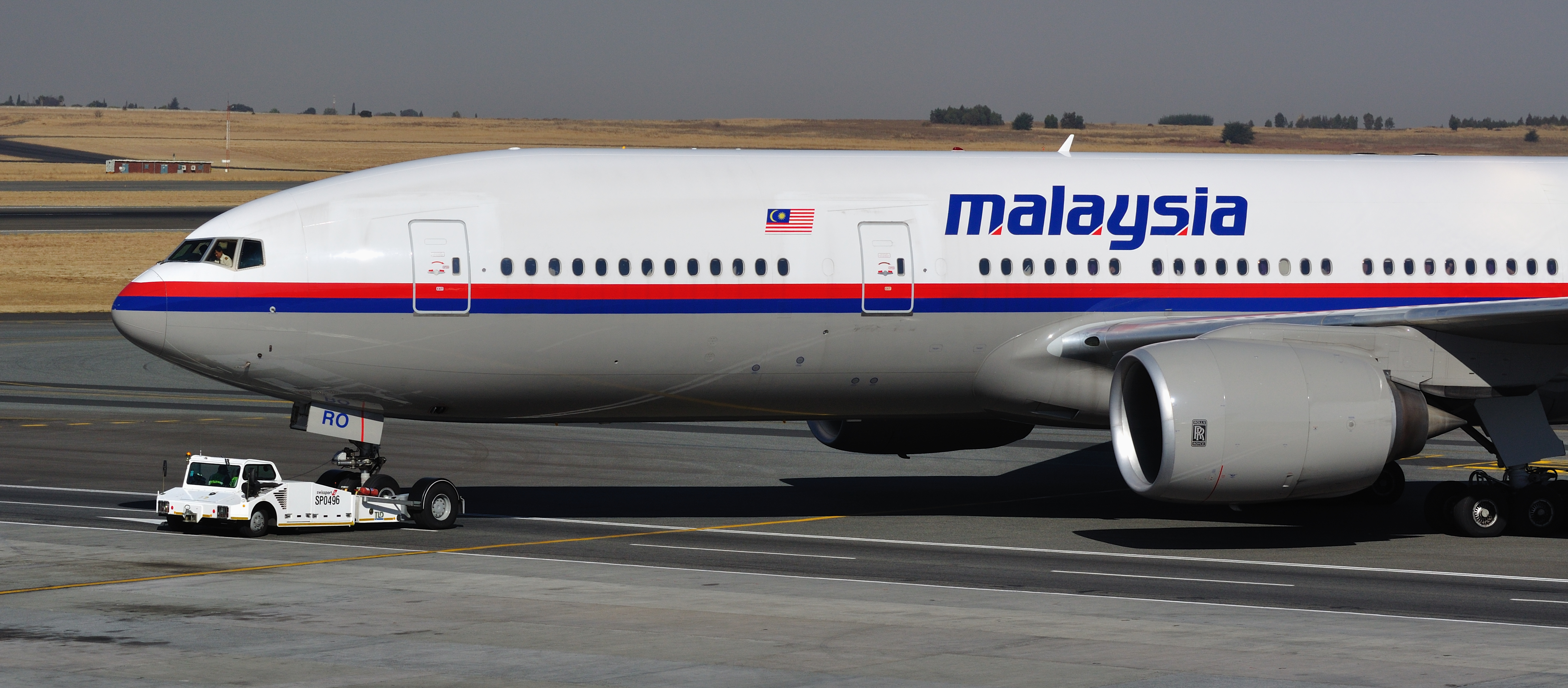
Malaysia Airlines Boeing 777 in Cape Town, South Africa. It was the only Southeast Asian airline that served South Africa and South America until 2012. The aircraft featured here, 9M-MRO, disappeared in 2014 as Flight 370.

Before the introduction of the BTP in 2006, Malaysia Airlines operated 118 domestic routes within Malaysia and 114 international routes across six continents. Under the Business Turnaround Plan, numerous routes were axed and frequencies reduced. Among these routes are Manchester, Vienna, Fukuoka, Chengdu, Nagoya, Xi'an, Cairo, Kolkata, Ahmedabad and Zürich. Malaysia Airlines became the first airline in Southeast Asia to fly to post-apartheid South Africa, and was the only airline in Southeast Asia to serve South America via South Africa until 2012. Prior to the 2014 aircraft losses, it had further suspended services to Cape Town, Rome, Dammam, Karachi, Surabaya, Johannesburg and Los Angeles. After the removal of the destinations such as Istanbul, Amsterdam, Paris and Frankfurt, its only remaining European destination is London (Heathrow), however, it has resumed flights to Paris Charles de Gaulle from Kuala Lumpur on 22 March 2025. The airline's last flight to Paris was in 2016.

Malaysia Airlines also owns its own charter flight division. Malaysia Airlines' charter flights have flown to destinations around the world, such as Guilin, which was previously one of Malaysia Airlines' scheduled destinations, and Christmas Island. Malaysia Airlines has also been the official airline for the Manchester United Asian Tour It also has a substantial Hajj operation.

In 2023, as part of its restructuring and network overhaul Malaysia Airlines has begun transferring a few of its domestic flights to its subsidiary Firefly. The transfer would take several phases. The airline however will retain core trunk domestic routes.

=== Joint ventures ===
Malaysia Airlines has joint ventures with the following airlines:

- Japan Airlines
- Singapore Airlines

=== Codeshare agreements ===
Malaysia Airlines codeshares with the following airlines:

- Air Mauritius
- American Airlines
- Bangkok Airways
- British Airways
- Cathay Pacific
- China Airlines
- China Southern Airlines
- Ethiopian Airlines
- Finnair
- Firefly (Subsidiary)
- Garuda Indonesia
- IndiGo
- Japan Airlines
- KLM
- Korean Air
- Myanmar Airways International
- Oman Air
- Philippine Airlines
- Qatar Airways
- Qantas
- Royal Air Maroc
- Royal Brunei Airlines
- Royal Jordanian
- Saudia
- Singapore Airlines
- SriLankan Airlines
- Thai Airways International
- Turkish Airlines
- Uzbekistan Airways
- XiamenAir

=== Interline agreements ===
Malaysia Airlines has interline agreements with the following airlines:

- Air Astana
- Airnorth
- APG Airlines
- Condor
- Hahn Air
- Jetstar
- Kuwait Airways
- MIAT Mongolian Airlines
- Pakistan International Airlines
- Royal Brunei Airlines
- Swiss International Air Lines

== Fleet ==
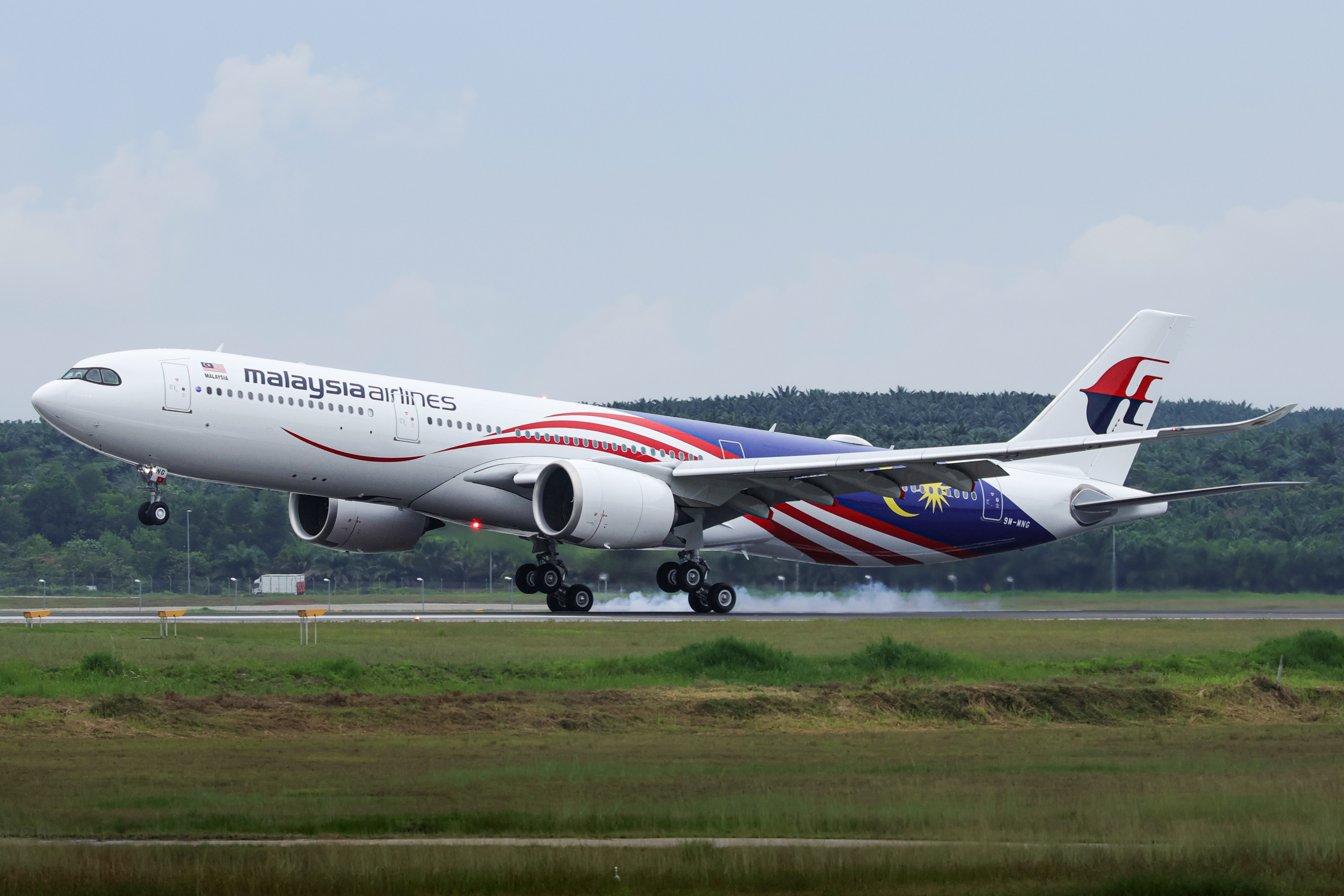
The first batch of Malaysia Airlines' A330-900 registered as 9M-MNG touching down

As of 5 September 2025, Malaysia Airlines has a total of 86 aircraft in its fleet. The fleet consist of Boeing 737-800, Boeing 737 MAX 8, Airbus A330-200, Airbus A330-300, Airbus A330-900, and the Airbus A350-900. The airline also operates three A330-200F via its subsidiary MASkargo.

Malaysia Airlines received their first out of six lease of Airbus A350-900 on 30 November 2017. This order came due to the retirement of their previous long haul airframe, Boeing 777-200ER majorly due to its tainted reputation with MH370 and MH17 incidents 4 months apart in 2014. These airframes became the current flagship of Malaysia Airlines and frequently deployed to long haul destinations such as London and Doha. The airline received their sixth airframe back in 2018 and recently added one more unit, previously operated by SAS in December 2023. This occasion signifying the airline requirement in seeking to lease 4 additional A350-900 to the initial six unit for fleet expansion.

In August 2022, Malaysia Airlines confirmed it would take delivery of an initial order of 20 Airbus A330neo aircraft, with purchase options for an additional 20, to gradually replace its A330-200 and A330-300 aircraft between Q3 2023 and 2028 for flights across Asia, the Pacific and the Middle East. The deliveries are set to be split between 10 direct purchases and 10 leases from Ireland's Avolon. The airline is expected to make a decision on Q1 2024 regarding its subsequent optional for another additional 20 frames orders on the A330neo from Airbus.

The airline has ordered 25 Boeing 737 MAX 8 with the first aircraft entering in Q4 2023.

On 30 November 2024, Malaysia Airline received its inaugural Airbus A330-900 (A330neo) aircraft, the first of many similar aircraft as part of the modernization strategy by the airline. The aircraft made a 13-hour flight from Airbus Delivery Centre in Toulouse, France and touched down at Kuala Lumpur International Airport with a traditional water cannon salute. Subsequently, Malaysia Airlines announced that the first flight for its A330neo fleet will service Melbourne beginning 19 December 2024.

In 2025, Malaysia Airlines has expanded its fleet acquisition with the announcement order of 18 Boeing 737 MAX 8, 12 Boeing 737 MAX 10 and 20 more Airbus A330neo. Plans to replace its older A330 freighter fleet are also planned.

== Services ==
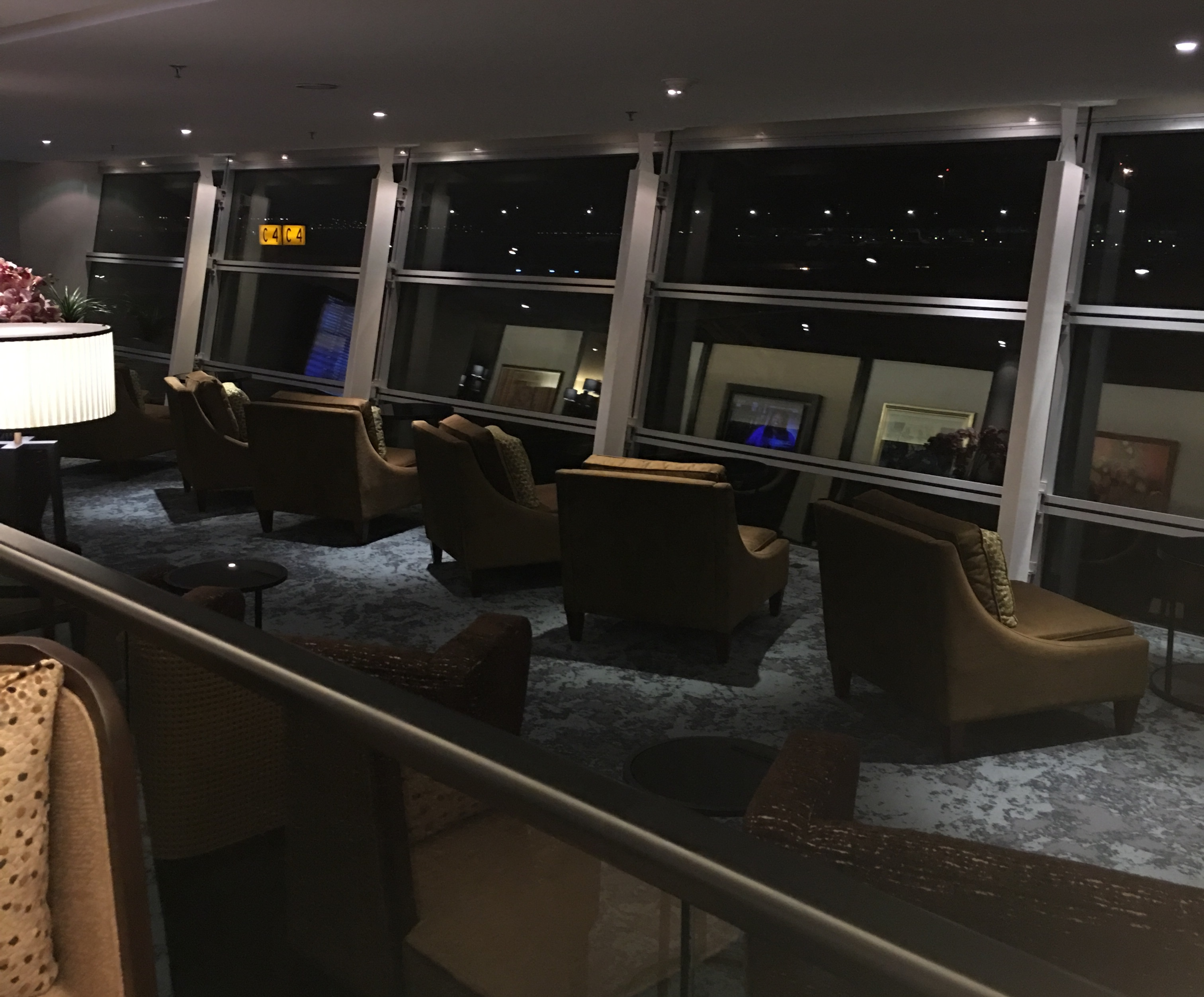
Malaysia Airlines' First Class Golden Lounge at Kuala Lumpur International Airport, after renovation. It was rebranded as the Business Suite Golden lounge on 12 December 2018.

The Golden Lounge is the airport lounge for Malaysia Airlines Business Suite Class, Business Class passengers and Enrich Platinum and Enrich Gold, eligible Oneworld and code-share partner members.

In April 2008, the airline launched its new Regional Golden Lounge at Kuala Lumpur International Airport for regional-bound front-end passengers. With this new lounge, Malaysia Airlines at Kuala Lumpur International Airport now has three lounges: the Satellite International Terminal Lounge, Domestic Lounge and Regional Lounge.

Between May 2017 and February 2018, Malaysia Airlines conducted an extensive renovation that saw all three lounges at Kuala Lumpur International Airport progressively refurnished and remodelled. The renovation saw completion with the re-opening of the Satellite International Lounge in March 2018.

With the closure of its sole international Golden Lounge in London, Heathrow, the airline currently only has lounges at Kuala Lumpur International Airport. Former domestic lounges in Kota Kinabalu, Kuching have been sold to third party operators with access still given to higher Enrich OneWorld frequent flyers and Business Class passengers.

=== Cabin ===
The airline received the "World's Best Cabin Crew" award by Skytrax in 2012, bringing home the international accolade eight times since 2001. All of Malaysia Airlines' aircraft have an economy and a business class section, whilst Business Suite class is only present on Airbus A350 aircraft.

==== Business Suite Class ====
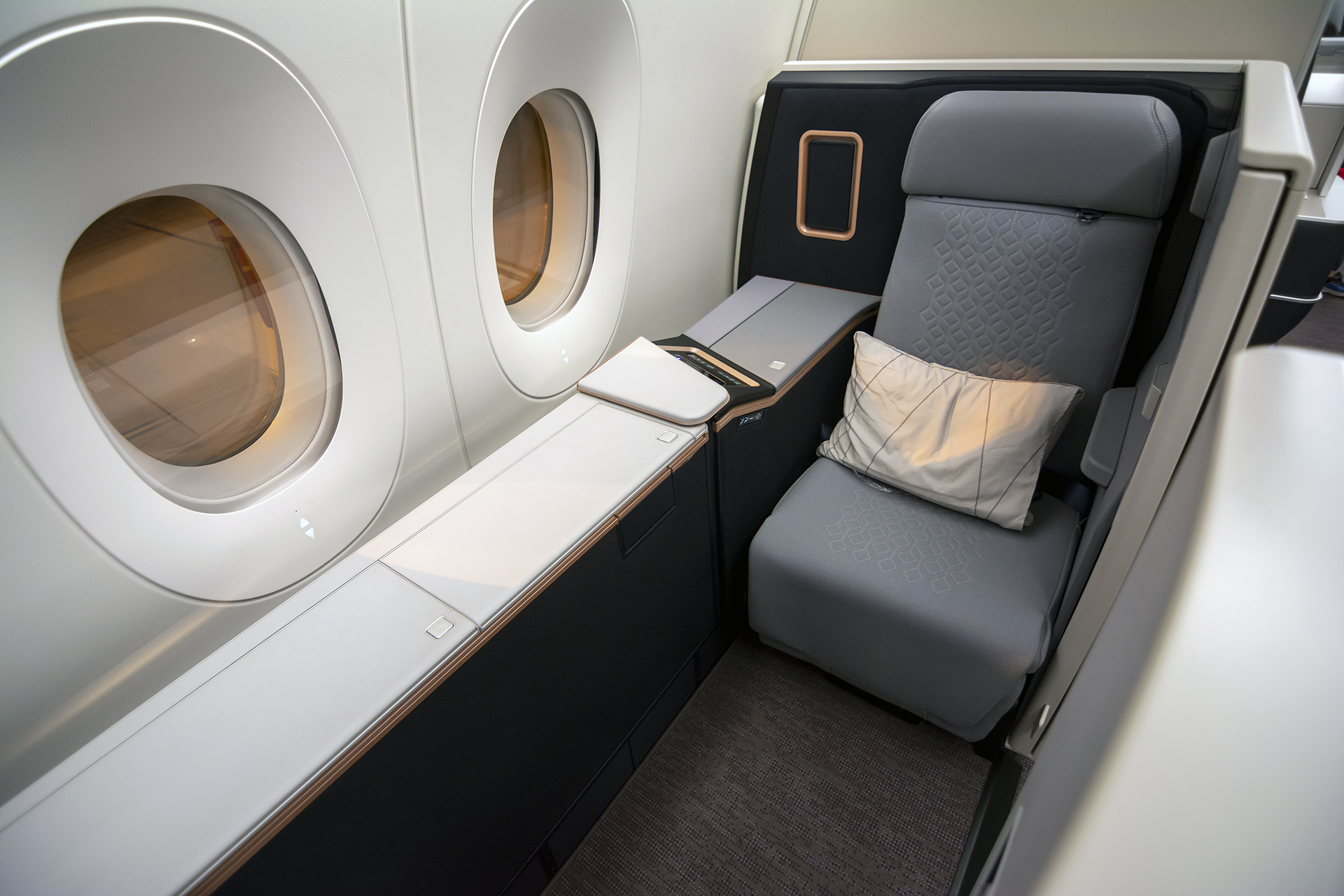
Malaysia Airlines Business Suite on the Airbus A350. Seat type to be removed after 2025.

Business Suite Class (previously known as First Class) is offered only on the Airbus A350. Provided by Thompson Aero based on the Vantage XL lineup the seats were customized to feature four fully enclosed suites with doors, and storage cabinets along the sides of the seats. Business Suite will be discontinued gradually in 2025 as the airline favors focusing on improving Business Class offering on the upcoming A330-900 and A350-900.

==== Business Class ====
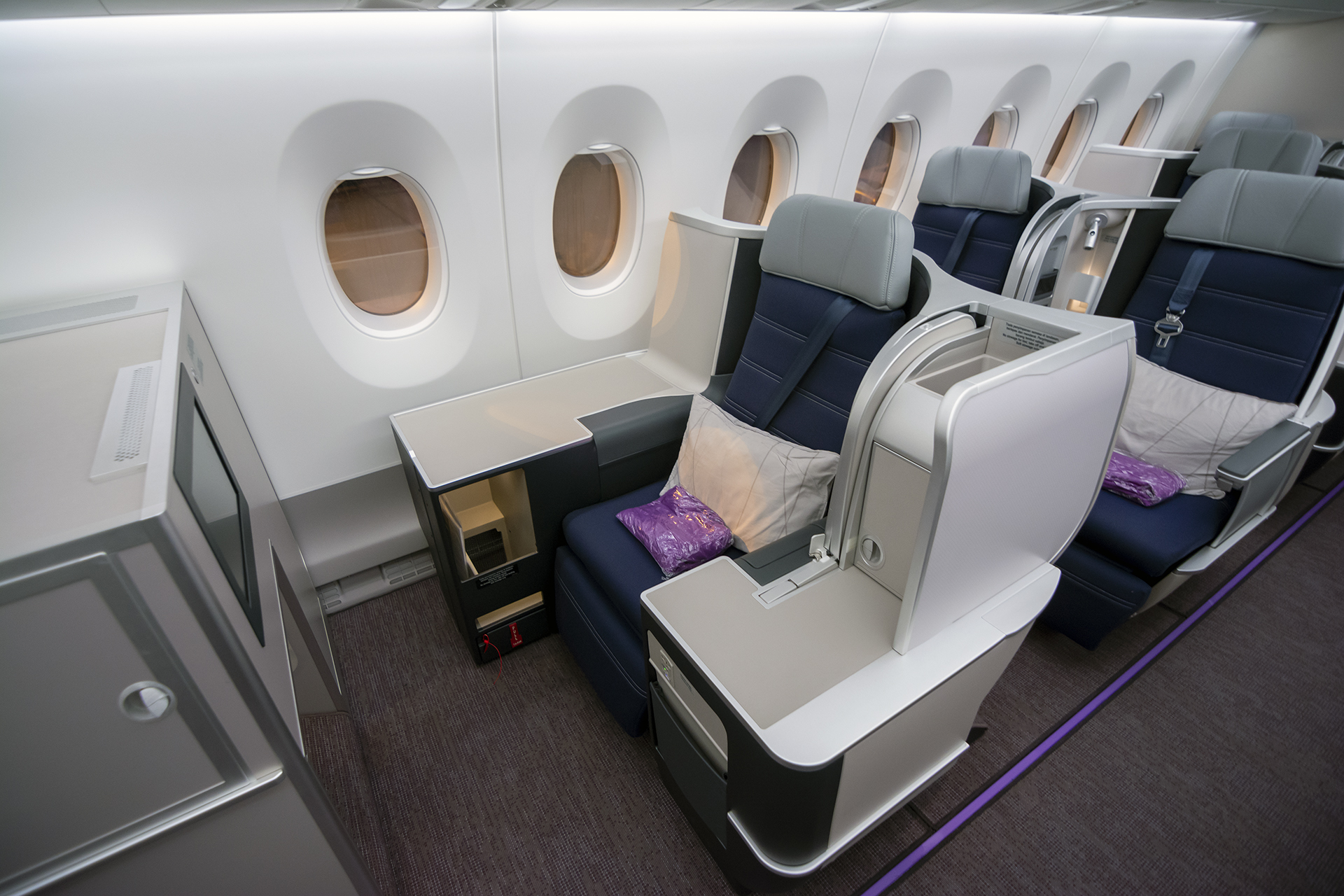
Malaysia Airlines Thompson Vantage Business Class Seats that are installed on the Airbus A330-300 and A350-900 fleet

Business Class (previously known as Golden Club Class) is available on all of Malaysia Airlines' fleet.

As of 2024, Malaysia Airlines have three different variants of business class seating based on the aircraft type and the route serviced.

- The domestic and regional business class seat introduced in 2022 based on the Safran's Z600 series, which can be found in Malaysia Airlines' Boeing 737-800 and Boeing 737- Max 8 fleet
- Medium and Long-haul business class seat introduced in 2016 based on Thompson Aero Vantage series. They are fully lie-flat seats configured in (1-2-1/1-2-2) across the Airbus A330-300 and the Airbus A350 fleet.
- The latest iteration of Malaysia Airline's business class offering is based on the Collins Aerospace Elevation platform, introduced in 2024. The seats will be configured in reverse herringbone design, in their new Airbus A330neo fleet. The Airbus A350 will also undergo cabin reconfiguration to have their seats updated. Featuring individual doors and direct isle access, the seats are equipped with wireless charging for personal devices and are equipped with modern personal inflight entertainment system.

In 2023, following the acquisition of additional A350 from SAS into the fleet, the airline has retained the business class seating based on the Thompson Aero Vantage XL platform.

==== Economy Class ====
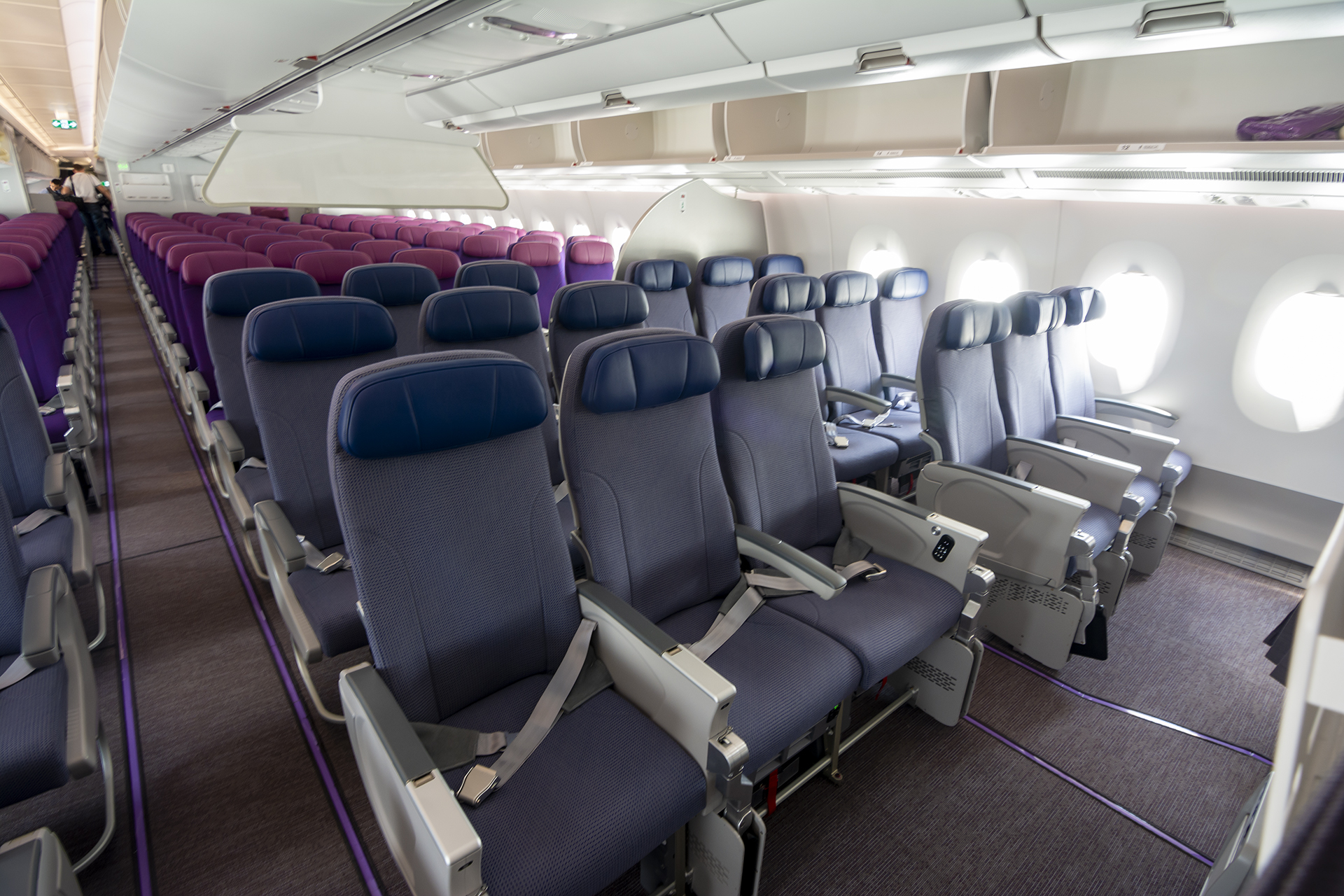
Airbus A350-900 economy class extra legroom (front) and economy class standard (rear).

Economy Class is available on all of Malaysia Airlines' fleet. Most of the fleet, including the Airbus A350-900, Airbus A330-300,-200, Boeing 737 MAX 8 and Boeing 737-800 features a seat pitch of 30–32 inches and width of 17–18 inches. Few row of seats are configured with extra legroom of up to 36inches for the A330 and A350 fleet.

In 2022, the airline has begun introducing a lighter more slimline seat for the narrowbody Boeing 737 fleet based on the Safran z110i lineup which features USB A and C charging. Personal in-flight entertainment is also replaced in favour of wireless entertainment content streaming provided by Viasat to be used on passengers personal devices.

Malaysia Airlines has unveiled a new economy class product to be featured on the airline's upcoming A330-900. It is based on Recaro's CL3810 lineup and feature a multitude of convenience features such as USB-C charging and WiFi connectivity.. Throughout the cabin, the seat covers will feature the signature songket motif. The same cabin will also extended to the A350 fleet once a refurbishment program commences in late 2025.

==== 'Baby ban' and 'child-free zone' ====
Malaysia Airlines has attracted both criticism and praise for its controversial decision to prohibit children from travelling in certain classes or cabins of its aircraft.

Infants are not permitted in First Class on Malaysia Airlines' Airbus A380s due to the non-availability of baby bassinets in the cabin. Then-CEO Tengku Azmil Zahruddin explained the policy, saying the airline received complaints from First Class passengers that they "spend money on first class and can't sleep due to crying infants".

Malaysia Airlines subsequently claimed that an upgrade of the First Class cabin to fit new seats and an ottoman (which doubles as a visitor seat) meant "there was no facility for positioning bassinets in the First Class of the 747s". Malaysia Airlines has also stated that children under the age of 12 may not travel in the 70-seat upper deck economy section of the A380. "The economy seats on upper level will be allocated for business travellers. Passengers accompanying children under 12 years old age will be excluded from booking these seats."

Malaysia Airlines says the decision "is to showcase the Economy Class zone in the main deck, enhanced and designated as a family and children friendly inflight zone. From the perspective of customers travelling with their families, the economy class family-friendly convenience would be a warm welcome. The main deck has more facilities such as toilets (8 for economy configuration of 350 seats) and the dual aerobridge airport facility supporting this deck will also mean a speedier/faster embarkation and disembarkation for this group of passengers."

=== In-flight entertainment ===
==== MH Studio ====
In 2023, Malaysia Airlines has begun introducing a new system called MH Studio which is a derivative of the Select in-flight entertainment interface the airline uses. Powered by Viasat it host 500 on-demand entertainment options that would be streamed on passengers personal devices wirelessly. Currently this system will only be installed on the Boeing 737-800 and Boeing 737 Max 8 fleet.

MH studio for the Airbus A330-900 includes personal inflight entertainment touch screen in each seat. Replacing the older Select interface system, the inflight entertainment system will be powered by Safran RAVE system with business class featuring a 17inch screen and economy with 13.3inch. The system comes with 4k resolution and features wireless headphone connectivity. The same system will be installed on the A350 cabin refurbishment program.

The airline has also integrated free unlimited internet wifi access across all of its cabin including economy class on most of its widebody aircraft and will gradually introduce them on narrowbody aircraft as well.

==== Select 3000i ====
All Malaysia Airlines Airbus A350-900, Airbus A330-300,-200 and Boeing 737-800 aircraft are equipped with an Inflight entertainment system, Select 3000i, with audio and video available in 14 languages. A majority of it being powered by the Panasonic eX2 and eX3 series. Select 3000i would be discontinued on all Boeing 737-800 in the future.

==== Select Mainscreen ====
Used in Economy Class on Boeing 737-800 (9M-ML*) regional and medium-haul aircraft, which features 15-inch drop-down retractable LCD screens are installed at every fourth seat row. Content is limited on these system as it is catered for selected flights only. Select mainscreen would be discontinued with the aircraft equipped to be transferred to the airlines subsidiary Firefly pending cabin refurbishing.

=== Sponsorships ===
Malaysia Airlines signed a 3-year sponsorship deal with Premier League club Liverpool FC in October 2016, giving it the right to be its Official Global Airline Partner. In addition, a six-minute advertisement video of Malaysia Airlines will be broadcast during home games at Anfield until the 2018-2019 season.

The airline has signed a commercial partnership with Manchester United F.C. in March 2024. This collaboration was signed with the goal of extending the airline's branding towards several key markets.

Malaysia Airlines served as the official global airline partner and associate sponsor for the Mumbai Indians cricket team for the 2026 season. The airline introduced a special Mumbai Indians-themed aircraft livery on an A330-300 to celebrate the collaboration under the theme "Two Blues, One Shared Journey".

== Loyalty programs ==
Malaysia Airlines' frequent flyer program is called Enrich by Malaysia Airlines. Enrich comprises airlines, banks, credit-card issuers, hotels and retailers around the world. The airline's former program was called Esteemed Traveller which was launched in 1987. The airline also operated a joint Asian frequent-flyer program: Passages. The joint program was officially dissolved in 1999, and the Enrich frequent-flyer program made its debut after the split from Passages.

=== Enrich by Malaysia Airlines ===
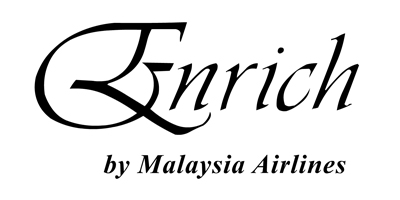
Logo for the Enrich program

On 12 July 2006, Malaysia Airlines introduced its enhanced frequent-flyer program. The program is now known as Enrich by Malaysia Airlines (Enrich).

In 2021, Enrich underwent rebranding focusing on travel and lifestyle programmes with increased digitization that allows members to purchase products from various retailers.

Members of Enrich are able to accrue miles on qualifying flights through Malaysia Airlines and Enrich airline partners:

- Oneworld alliance airline partners (effective 1 February 2013)
- Air France, Etihad Airways, Emirates, KLM, Firefly, MASwings, Singapore Airlines, S7 Airlines

Members of Enrich are able to collect miles from their daily credit spending, depends on issuers and category of spending.

=== Journify ===
Malaysia Aviation Group which governs Malaysia Airlines and its subsidiaries introduced Journify which is a mobile app that allows passengers to purchase various services and products. Some of the services include pre departure snacks and drinks from participating outlets. The app also features travel passes, Flight+Hotel packages and Temptation inflight product with all sales and purchases allowing Enrich points accruement

== Incidents and accidents ==
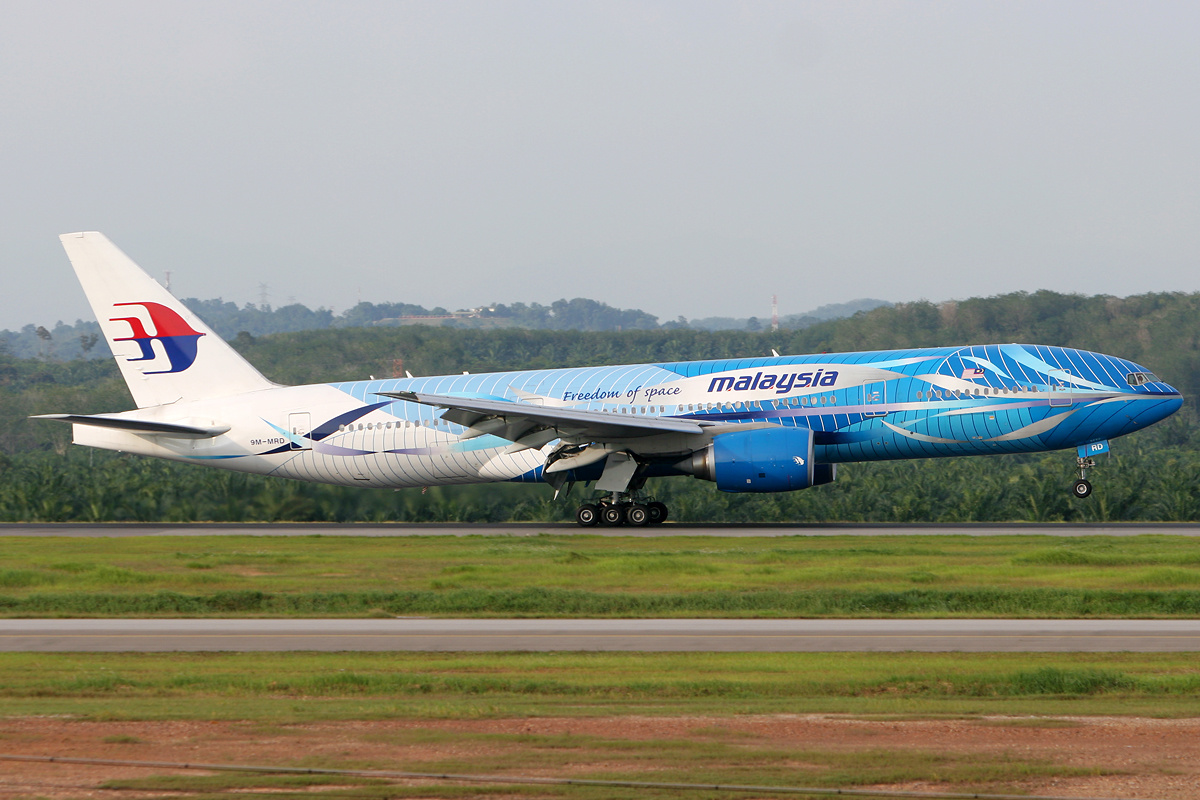
9M-MRD, the aircraft that was shot down over Ukraine while operating Flight 17

- 4 December 1977 – Malaysian Airline System Flight 653, a Boeing 737-200 – registered 9M-MBD – was hijacked and crashed in Tanjung Kupang, Johor, killing all 100 people on board.
- 18 December 1983 – Malaysian Airline System Flight 684, an Airbus A300B2 – registered OY-KAA – crashed 2 km short of the runway at Subang Airport, with no fatalities among the 247 passengers and crew.
- 15 September 1995 – Malaysia Airlines Flight 2133, a Fokker 50 – registered 9M-MGH – touched down too far along the runway at Tawau Airport, Sabah and crashed in a shantytown during the subsequent go-around. Of the 49 passengers and 4 crew on board, 32 passengers and 2 crew were killed. The probable cause was poor handling of the aircraft by the pilot.
- 8 March 2014 – Malaysia Airlines Flight 370, a Boeing 777-200ER – registered 9M-MRO – carrying 227 passengers and 12 crew, went missing on a flight from Kuala Lumpur International Airport to Beijing Capital International Airport. Although the whereabouts of the plane remain unknown, satellite data indicates that the plane was lost in the Southern Indian Ocean and all 239 people on board perished. On 5 August 2015 the Malaysian government confirmed a flaperon from a 777 found washed up on Réunion Island belonged to Flight 370. A piece of aircraft wreckage (an outboard flap) found on Pemba Island off the Tanzanian coast in June 2016 was also confirmed by the Malaysian Transport Ministry to belong to MH370.
- 17 July 2014 – Malaysia Airlines Flight 17, a Boeing 777-200ER – registered 9M-MRD – en route to Kuala Lumpur International Airport from Amsterdam Schiphol Airport was shot down over Ukraine by a Buk surface-to-air missile. All 283 passengers and 15 crew members aboard died.

== See also ==
- List of companies of Malaysia
- List of airports in Malaysia
- Transport in Malaysia
