= Eaglexpress =

Malaysian charter airline (2011-2016)

Eaglexpress Air Charter Sdn Bhd

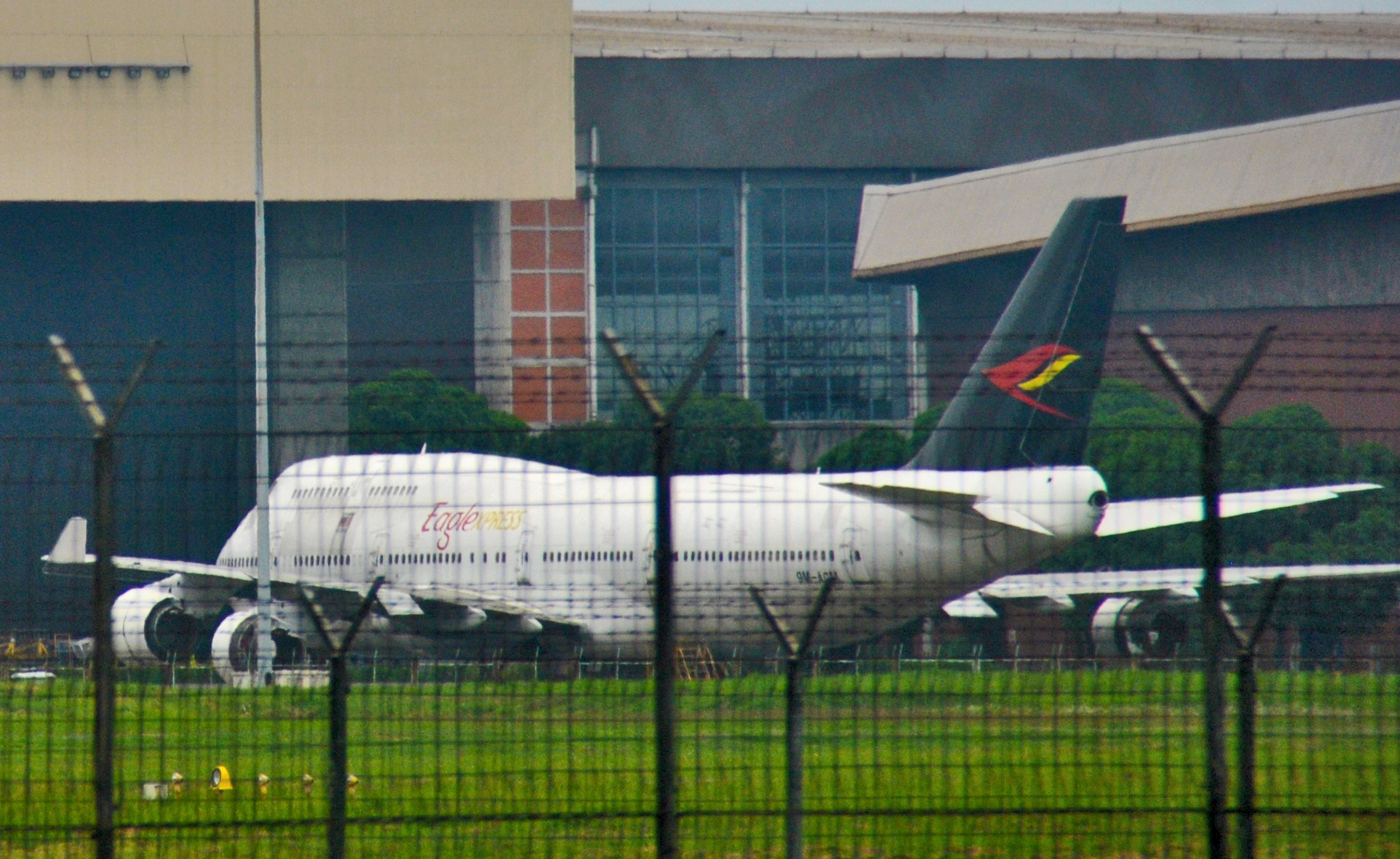
- Eaglexpress Boeing 747-400 sitting on facility at Indonesia, photographed 2017
IATA	ICAO	Call sign
9A	EZX	EAGLEXPRESS AIR
- Founded: 8 August 2011
- Commenced operations: 19 September 2012
- Ceased operations: 2016
- Operating bases: Kuala Lumpur International Airport
- Fleet size: 2
- Headquarters: Selangor, Malaysia
- Key people: Azlan Zainal Abidin (CEO)
- Website: www.eaglexpressair.com

Eaglexpress was a charter airline with its headquarters in Selangor, Malaysia and base at Kuala Lumpur International Airport.

== History ==
The airline was a joint venture between private investors in Malaysia and South Korea, with 60%-40% holding respectively, it plans on specialising in Pilgrimage, Holiday and Business charters as well as ACMI operations on behalf of other airlines.

The company was set up in January 2012 and operated their first charter flight in February for a holiday group from South Korea to Malaysia, it was followed by Umra flights to Jeddah for a Malaysian Travel Agency under a six-month contract from March to mid September, flying Pilgrims from Malaysia, Southern Thailand and Indonesia.

The airline hoped to have 8 aircraft by the end of 2012, which include Boeing 737-400/Boeing 737-800, and up to 20 aircraft in the next 5 years. Their first Hajj service to Jeddah took off 21 September 2012.

On 20 December, The Edge reports that Eaglexpress Air Service Permit (ASP) has been revoked, and it shall have no effect from 21 Dec 2016, according to a statement issued by Malaysian Aviation Commission.

== Fleet ==
=== Current fleet ===
The Eaglexpress fleet consisted of the following aircraft (as of August 2017):

Aircraft	In service	Orders	Passengers	Notes
Boeing 747-400	2	—		
Total	2			

=== Historic fleet ===
- 1 Airbus A330-200 (operating for flynas). It was later returned to the lessor, Guggenheim Aviation Partners after being withdrawn from use on 7 June 2016.
