= Kampung Buang =

- Location within Borneo
- Coordinates: 4.13333°N 114.48333°E
- Country: Malaysia
- State: Sarawak
- Administrative Division: Marudi
- Elevation: 199 m (653 ft)

Kampung Buang is a settlement in the Marudi division of Sarawak, Malaysia. It lies approximately 541.6 kilometres (337 mi) east-north-east of the state capital Kuching, near the border with Brunei.

Neighbouring settlements include:

- Kampung Setapang 5.6 kilometres (3.5 mi) west
- Rumah Linei 5.6 kilometres (3.5 mi) south
- Rumah Itoh 5.9 kilometres (3.7 mi) west
- Rumah Beji Selijau 7.9 kilometres (4.9 mi) northwest
- Rumah Likong 8.3 kilometres (5.2 mi) southwest
- Rumah Puyut 9.2 kilometres (5.7 mi) west
- Rumah Mauh 9.2 kilometres (5.7 mi) west
- Rumah Penghulu Nyaloi 9.4 kilometres (5.8 mi) west
- Rumah Sungai Babi 9.4 kilometres (5.8 mi) west
- Kampung Engkabang 10 kilometres (6.2 mi) west
