= Kampung Melikat =

- Location within Borneo
- Coordinates: 4.08333°N 114.4°E
- Country: Malaysia
- State: Sarawak
- Administrative Division: Marudi
- Elevation: 114 m (374 ft)

Kampung Melikat is a settlement in the Marudi division of Sarawak, Malaysia. It lies approximately 530.8 kilometres (330 mi) east-north-east of the state capital Kuching.

Neighbouring settlements include:

- Rumah Liman 0 kilometres (0.0 mi) north
- Kampung Engkabang 1.9 kilometres (1.2 mi) north
- Rumah Liyom Belasoi 2.6 kilometres (1.6 mi) southeast
- Rumah Likong 2.6 kilometres (1.6 mi) northeast
- Rumah Emang Brit 4.1 kilometres (2.5 mi) northwest
- Rumah Sebatang 4.1 kilometres (2.5 mi) northwest
- Rumah Bukit 5.2 kilometres (3.2 mi) southeast
- Rumah Itoh 5.2 kilometres (3.2 mi) northeast
- Rumah Kudol Muam 5.6 kilometres (3.5 mi) west
- Rumah Mauh 5.6 kilometres (3.5 mi) north
