= Marudi (disambiguation) =

Marudi is a town in Sarawak, Malaysia.

Marudi may also refer to:

- Marudi Airport, in Marudi, Malaysia
- Marudi (state constituency), represented in the Sarawak State Legislative Assembly
- Marudi District
