= Usun Apau Plieran =

Chronology of Badeng Usun Apau
← / Kingdom of Sarawak; ← / Leaders conflict between Lumai Bilung and Tasi Balan; ← / Charles Hose visits the Madangs tribe Lg Benalui, Apau Data Nov 1898; ← / Peace at Marudi; ← / Brooke attacks; ← / Japanese occupation; ← / Long Iran Swk 1961; ← / Sarawak Day; ← / Lg Mujan, Baram; ← / Confrontation; ← / Lg Taa, Plieran**; ← / Lg Malim, Danum; ← / Peace-making Kapit 1924; ← / Expedition Baram(Tinjar)- Plieran-Rajang(Dapoi) - Tom H & David Leach; ← / Oxford expedition - Guy Arnold 1954,1955; ← / Lian Apui 1907; ← / Lg Bora, Plieran; ← / Tasi Balan detained in Marudi; ← / Cholera and Smallpox epidemics 1888; ← / Cholera epidemics 1902; ← / Mr E.V. Andreini allows Badeng to return Belaga; ← / Lidung Jelo, Plieran; ← / First Settlement in Plieran; ← / Badeng Lio

Usun Apau Plieran is a remote abandoned Kenyah Jamuk, Badeng and Lepu Aga' village settled in 1860, Belaga district. To be exact, Usun Apau Plieran is located at the upstream of Sungai Plieran and Sungai Tiyut. The highest peak that close to this area are Bukit Busing 1300m and Mudung Batu Bora about 1450m. There are a few old longhouse sites in this area such as Long Metalon, Long Ampan Aing (Sungai Abanang), Long Bora (Sungai Bora), Long Taa, Ka Laeh, Lidung Jelo and Lolau Mabo.

Travel to Plieran involves a six-hour 4WD drive from Bintulu to Belaga, using the Bintulu-Bakun trunk road and look for the junction to Murum Dam from the Murum Dam junction it takes about 80 km to the Metalun new Penan resettlement.

== History ==
As requested by the Baram Resident officer Dr. Charles Hose (1891), in 1893 some of the Kenyah Badeng (the Madangs) of Plieran migrated to Baram headwaters in Long Teboken, Teboken river and two years later, after harvest festival they moved downriver to Long Benalui, Data river (tributary to Silat river) where Dr. Charles Hose, the Baram Resident organized an expedition and visited their village at the foot of Mudong Alan, Long Benalui on November 3, 1898 (to what he called 'the Madangs country'). The remaining who refused to migrate to Baram, finally at this point a few of them turned back to Lidung Jelo, Long Benampan (Sungai Luar), Long Malim, Long Petan and Long Ca, Sungai Danum in 1918 to join the other Kenyah Badeng (the Madangs) groups in Danum. The exact location of their settlements in East Usun Apau and upper Rejang was not stated in Charles Hose's journal because he never visit them in upper Rejang. He only visited them in 1898 when some of them have moved from East Usun Apau to remote Upper Silat (Long Benalui, Data River near Mudong Alan). The oral history of our ancestors were the single source of truth about a few settlement areas.

"Hose's progress was delayed by endless palavers and by rivers in spate from the heavy rain in the mountains. Finally, his flotilla of canoes entered the Silat, the last major tributary of the Baram, where they were met by the emissaries from the Madang. Just who the Madang were remains something of a mystery. Indeed, they managed to have hostile relations with all their neighbors and seem to have moved about repeatedly in search of an isolated valley. Iban depredations had only recently caused them to move from the headwaters of the Rejang, to the East of Usun Apau, and so into the remote upper Silat River (Hose and McDougall 1912:II:28I-92)"

Lidung Jelo, at Usun Apau Plieran (Pliran / Plieran / Pleiran / Peliran) is a fully abandoned Kenyah Badeng populated old village settlement in 1920s, Belaga district. Plieran holds a very special place in the hearts of many Badeng Madangs. We owe it to them and to future generations to conserve and enhance its natural environment and cultural assets. These places were visited in the late 1930s, 1940s, 1977, 1980s, 1989 and 2006 by a few groups of Kenyah Badeng to verify the old longhouse sites as well as the ancient burial sites. Due to the great pressure from the Baram Resident Officer, in 1891, practically all the inhabitants of the Baram had accepted the Rajah's government and acknowledged it by the payment of any tax, called door-tax of two dollars per family. The Kenyahs, do not feel needed of any such protection, were less ready to accept the Resident's proposals. First of all, they desired peace, or at any rate less warfare, and it was possible to convince them that this result might be achieved by pointing to other districts such as the Rejang and Jenalong (Tubau), with whose affairs they had some acquaintance. Most of them eventually start to move from Lidung Jelo go upstream Plieran and entered the Medang river (a tributary of the hulu Plieran river) adjacent to the river that flows into the Teboken river then Data river and settled at the confluence of the so-called Long Teboken. Three (3) years later they went to Long Benalui (not far from Mudong Alan) another tributary to Data river and not far from the Silat river in Baram district.

During our recent expedition to the village site in Lidung Jelo, Usun Apau Plieran, we found more than three upright piles (a real hardwood) of old houses in a straight line still remained in the ground.

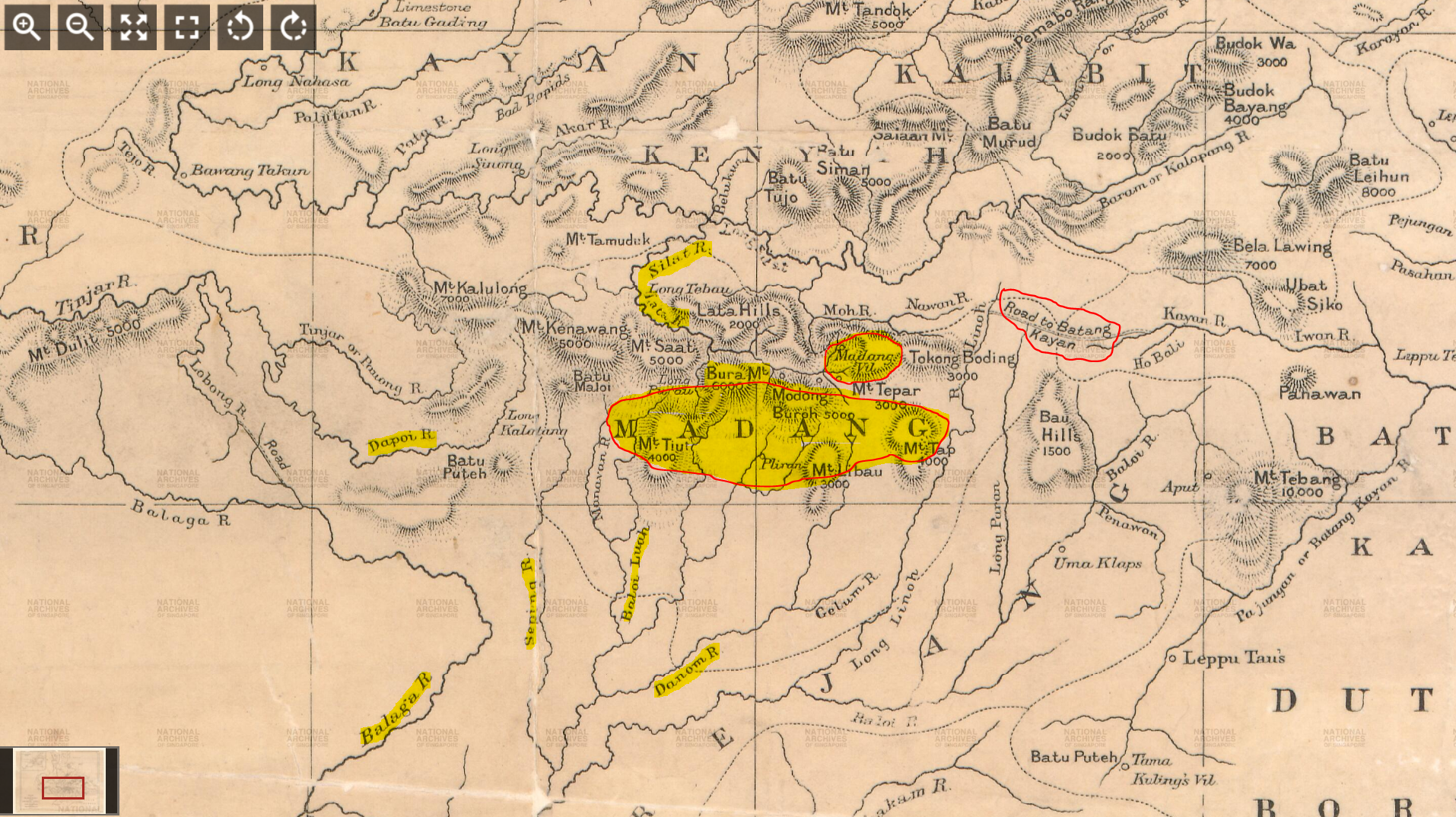
ca Lepuun Lepo bio Badeng ka Usun Apau

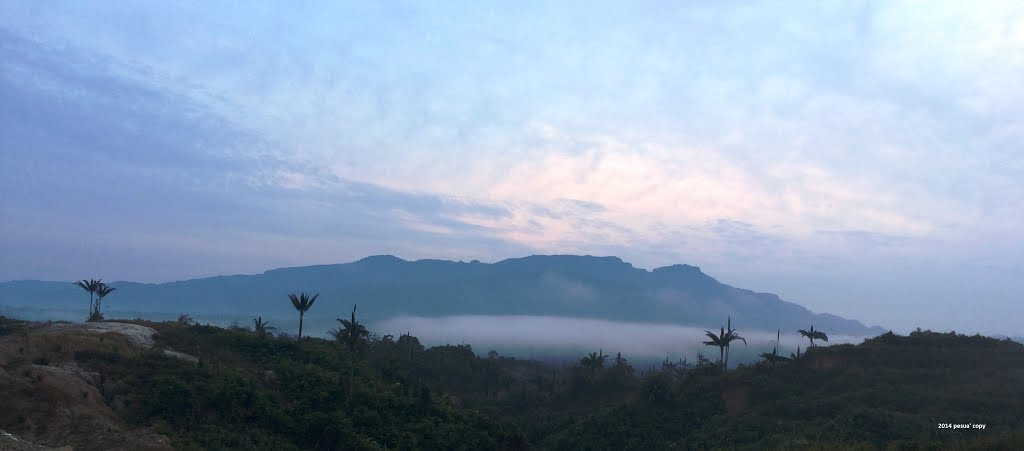
Mudung Batu Bora from Long Luar, new Penan village resettlement, sago palm trees are visible in the Panoramic view of Plieran

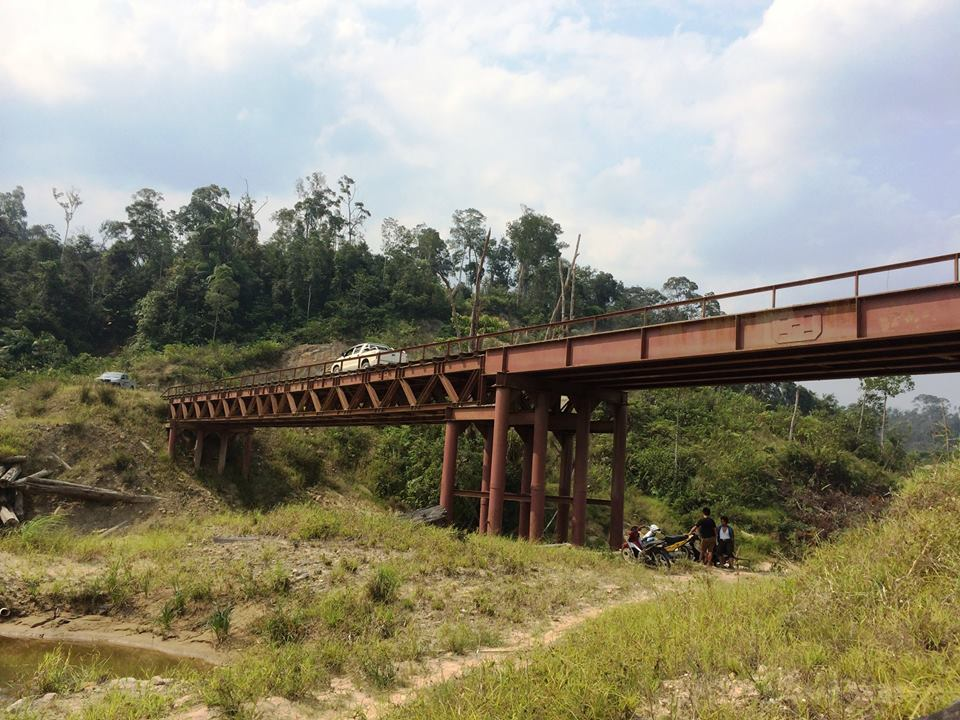
Plieran bridge view from Plieran river bank, Long Ampan Aing old village site

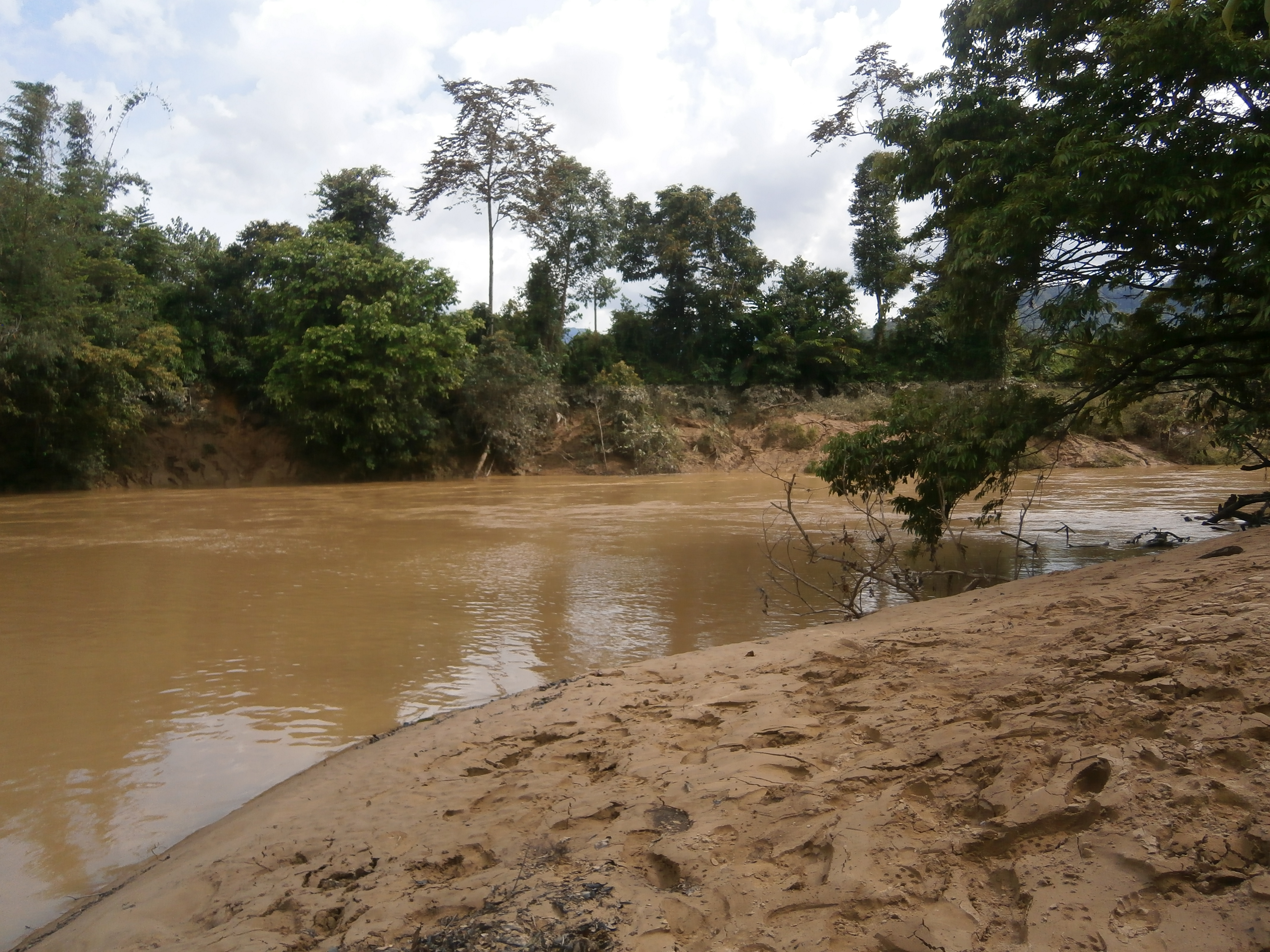
village site at Lidung Jelo

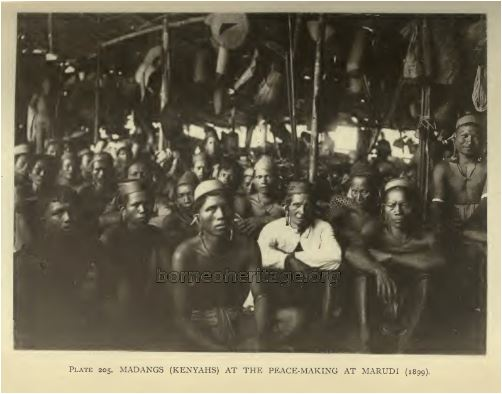
The Madangs supported the peace making in Marudi

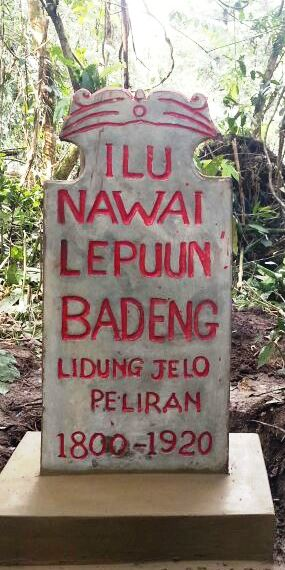
Lidung Jelo, UA Plieran monument picture

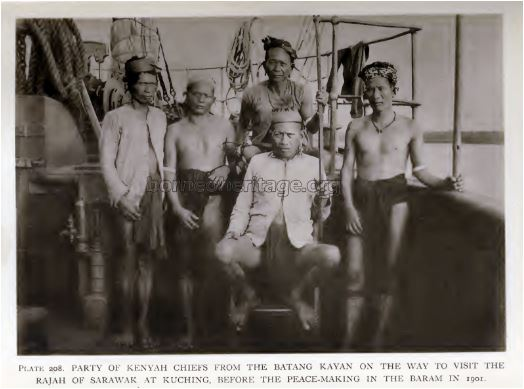
the Kenyah chiefs from Batang Kayan, Sungai Data, Plieran and Danum

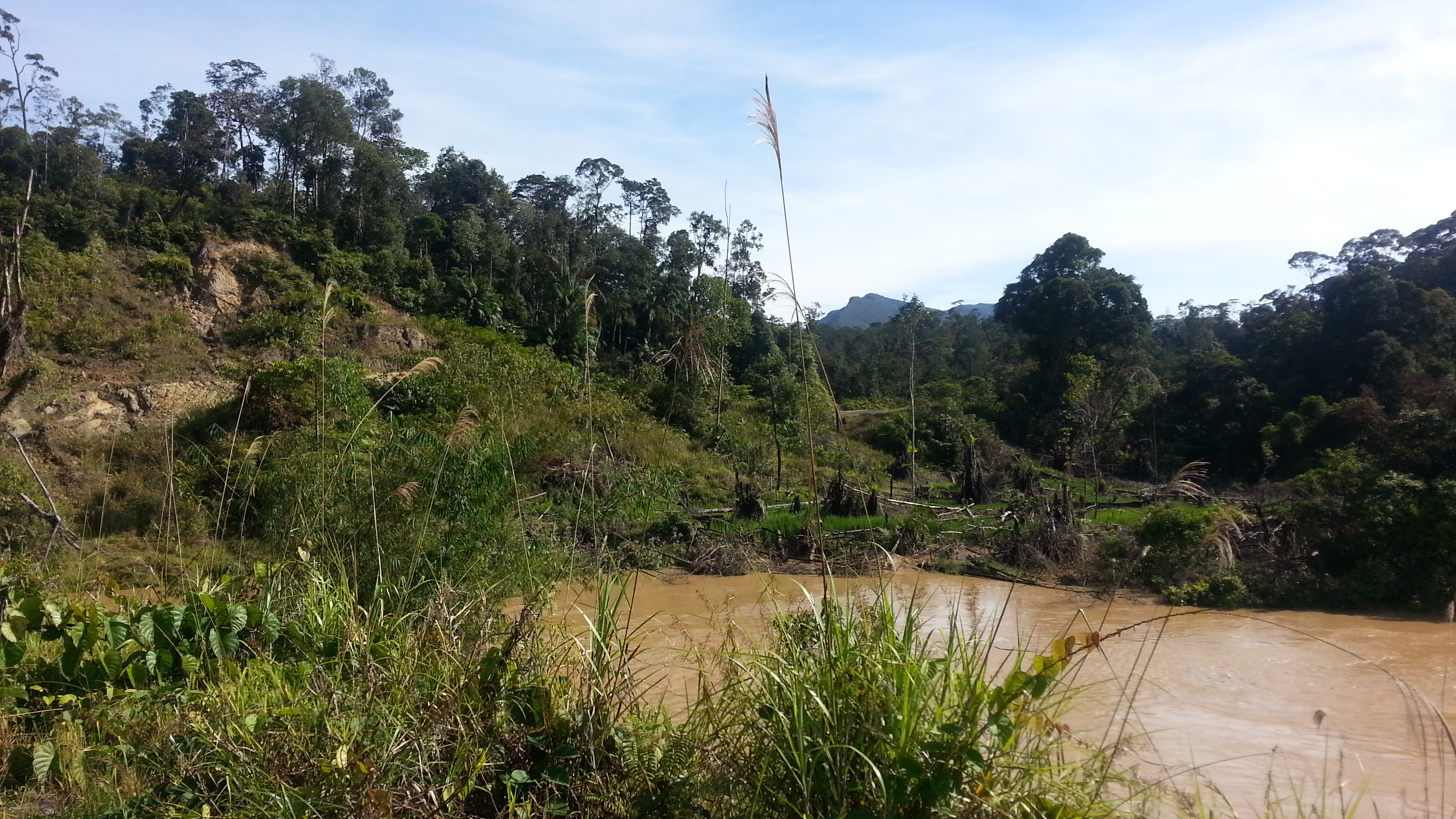
Long Ampang Aing site

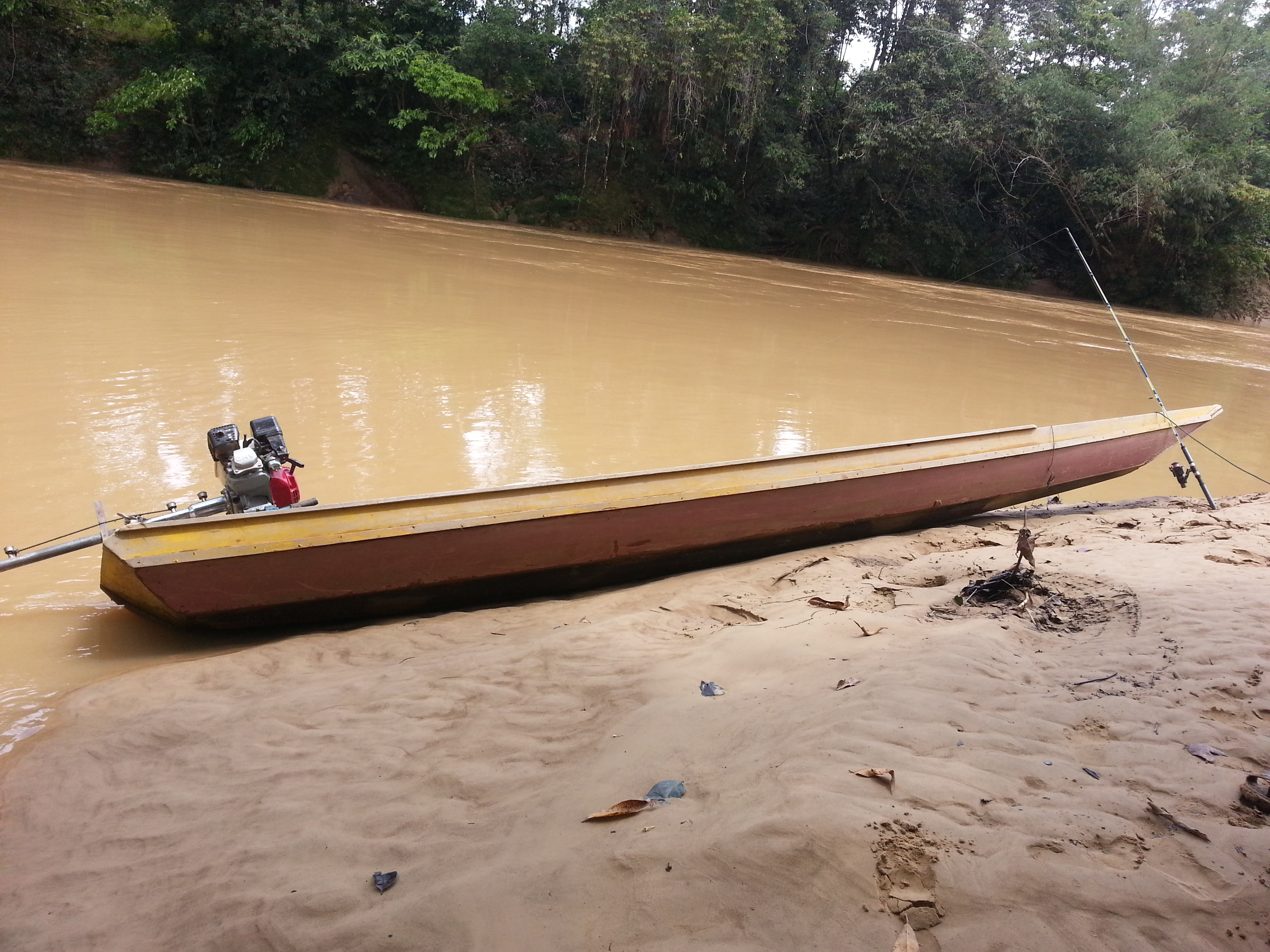
small boat & water levels rise after heavy rain overnight at Lidung Jelo

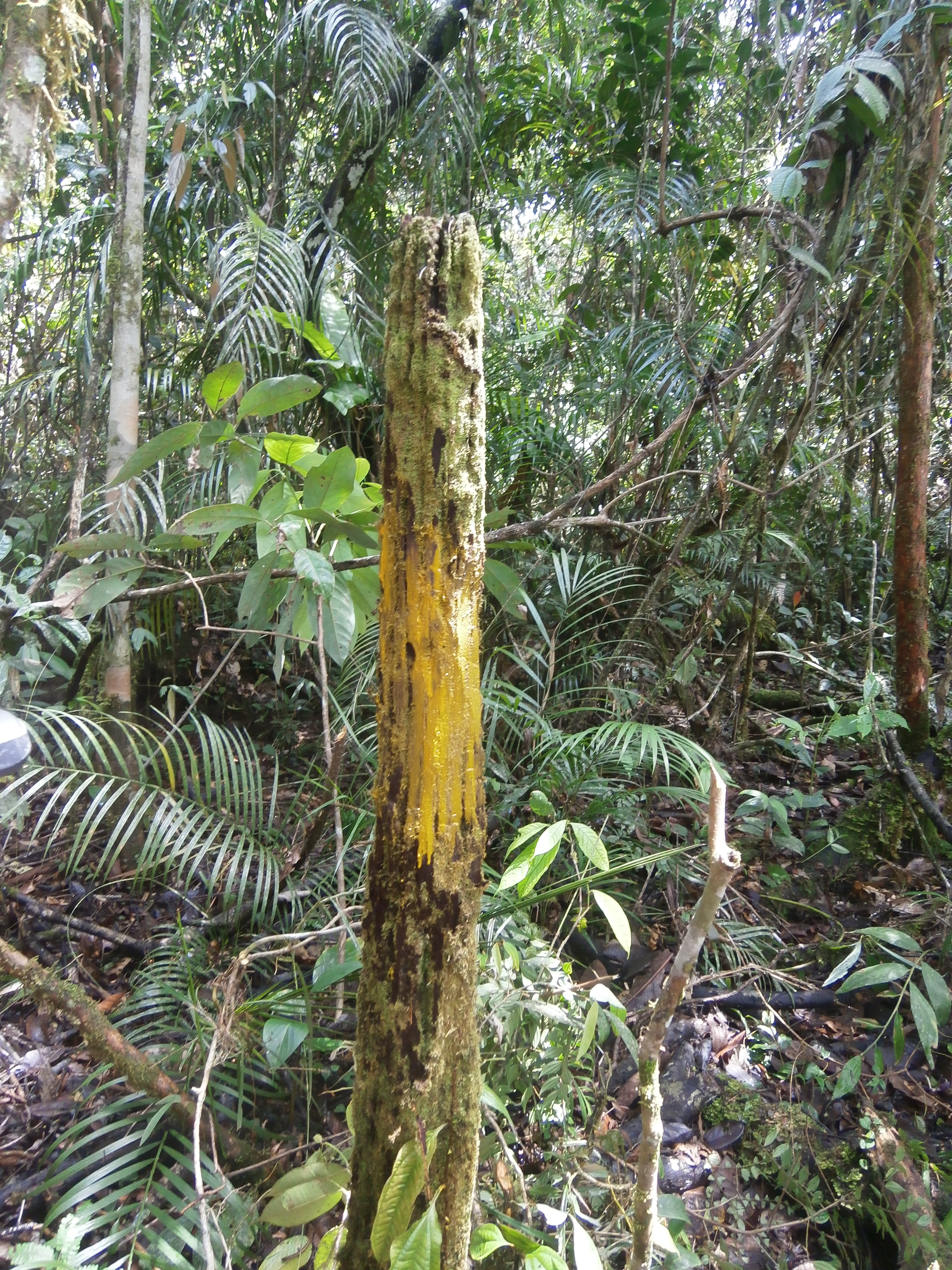
Pile #1 of an old house found in Lidung Jelo, Plieran

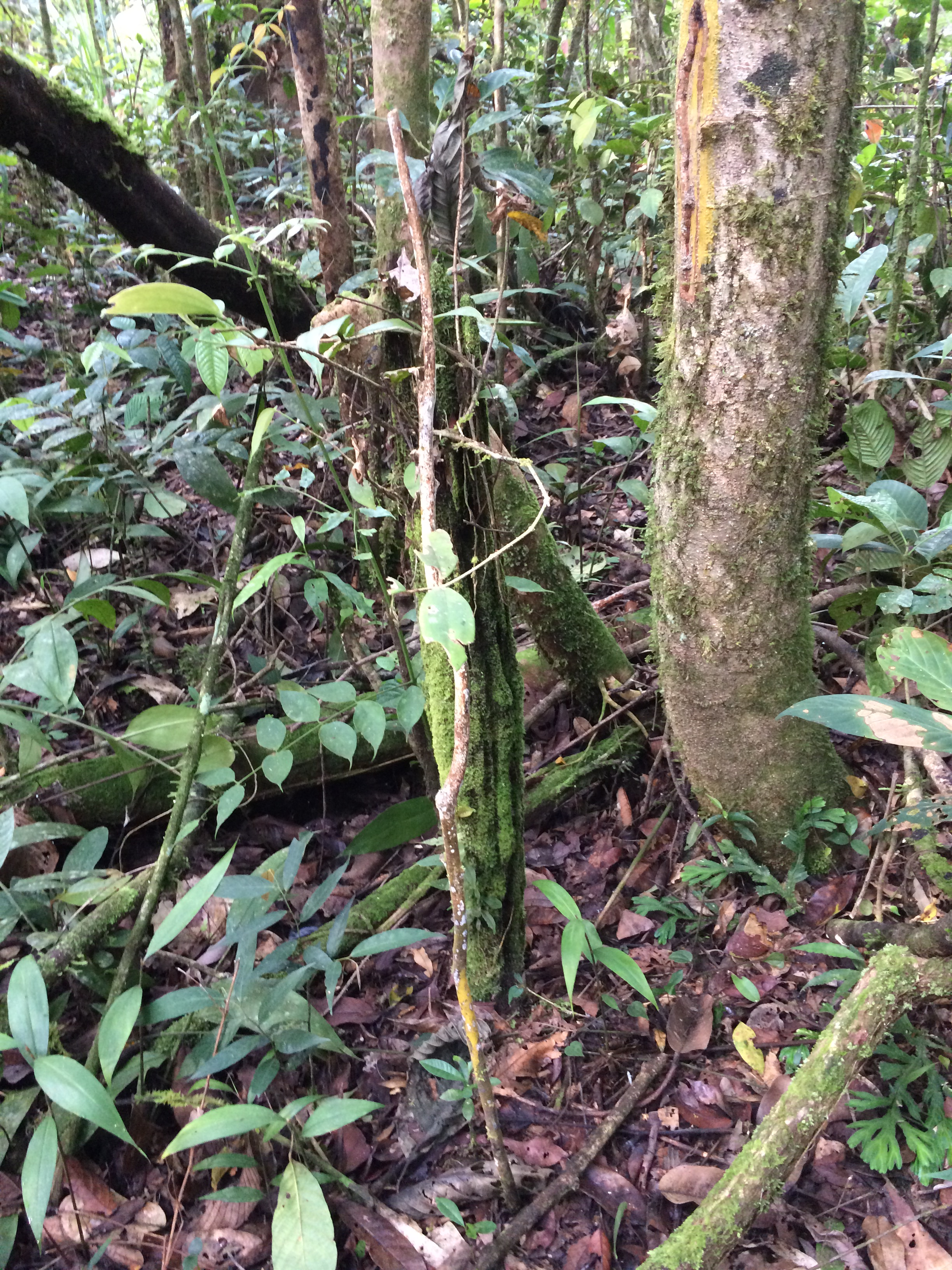
a pile #3 of an old house in Lidung Jelo, Plieran

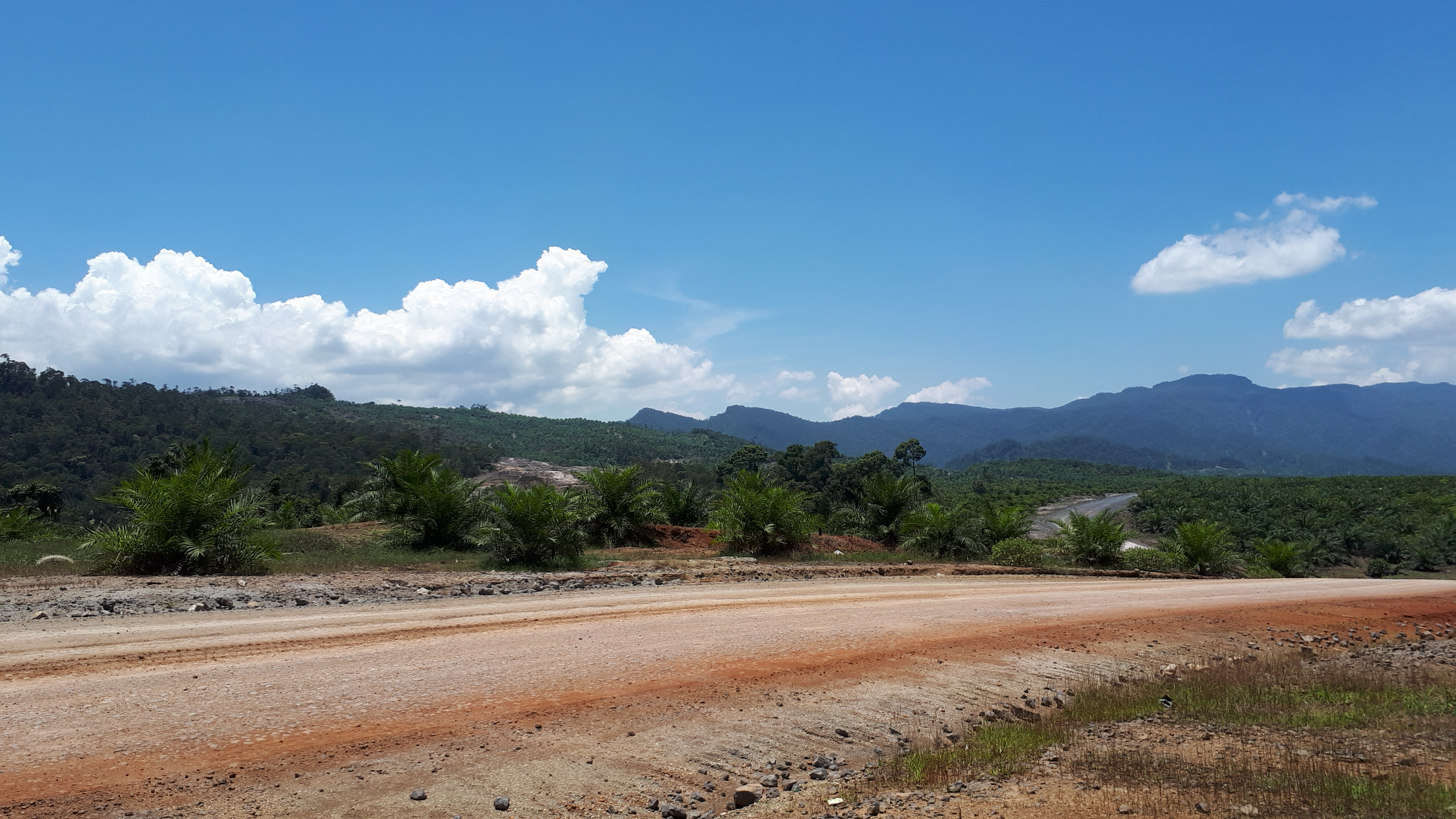
Plieran Valley

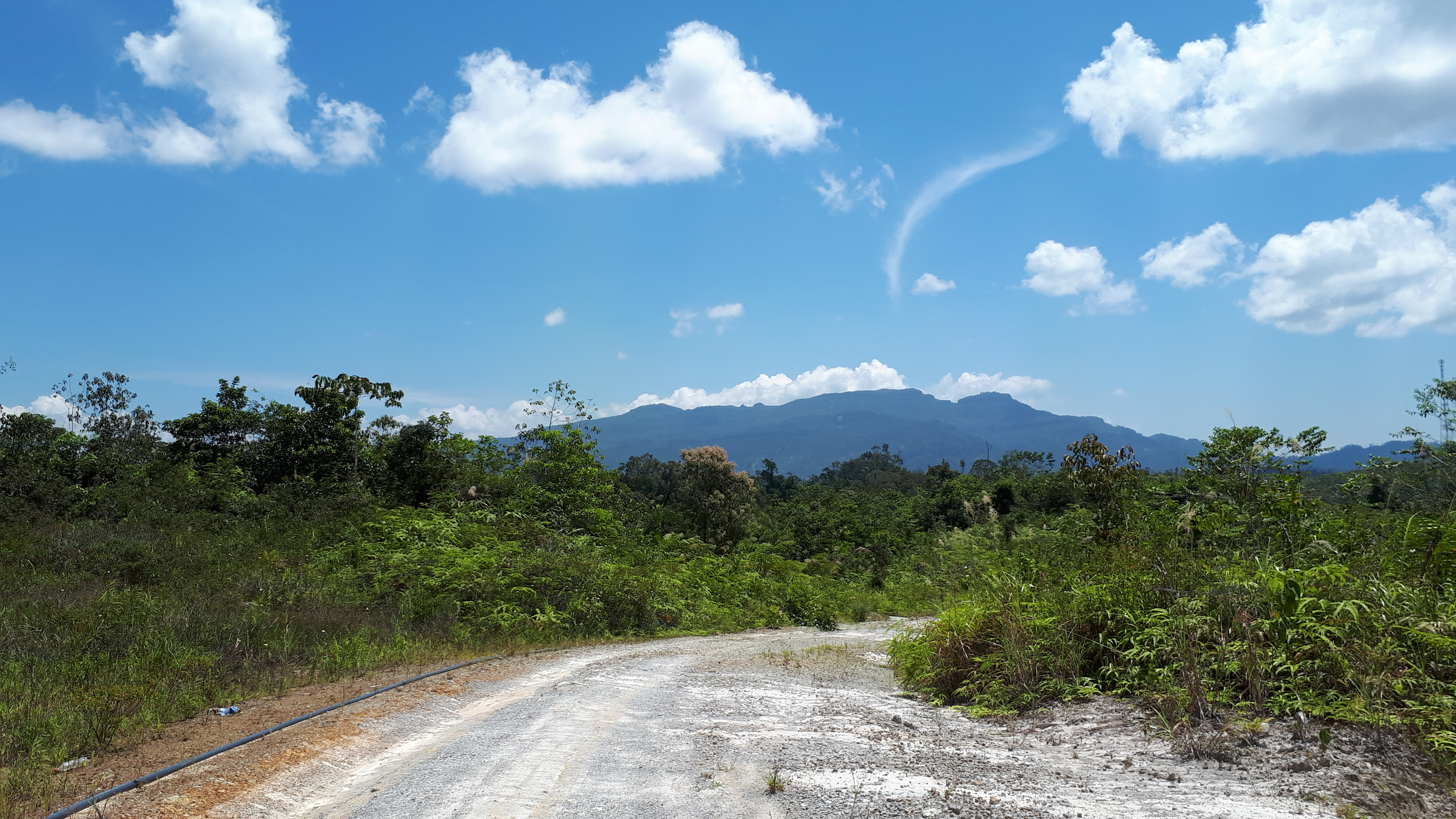
Southern Usun Apau

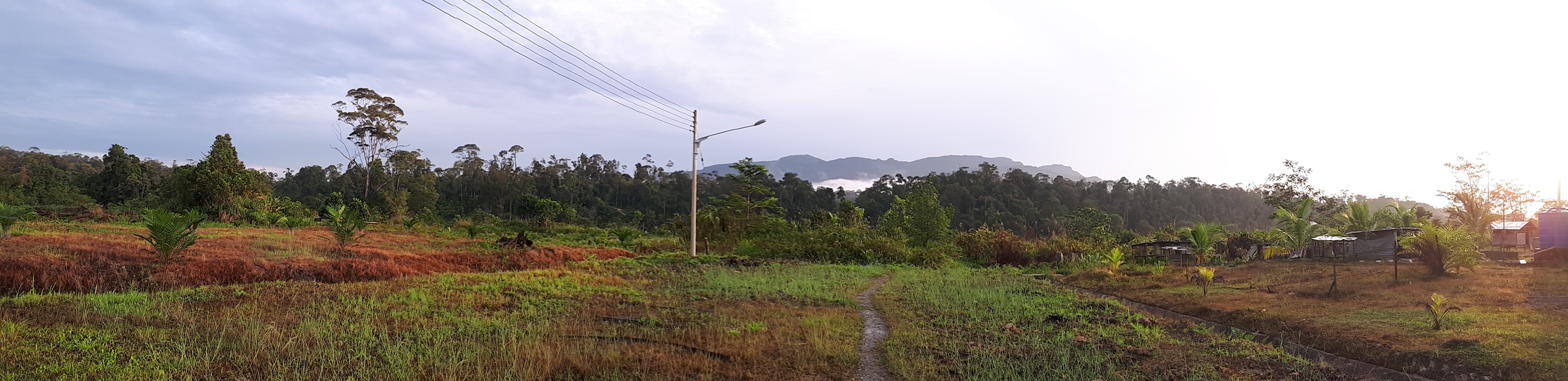
Metalun panorama view

== Geography ==
The Mount of Batu Bora is one of two peaks of a mountain ridge which runs for 2.5 kilometres (1.6 miles) just northwest of the abandoned Kenyah settlements along the Plieran river, in this area called the Plieran Valley and on the northwest is Apau Beduk. The peak to its north is called Mudung Batu Bora, at 1,450 metres (4,760 feet), while the peak to the far north is the Mount Selidang, at 1,410 m (4,630 ft). The ridge acts as a watershed, and its eastern side is the beginning of the Tiang and Weng river and to the south is Plieran river.

== Location ==
The Usun Apau Plieran Highlands are a series of beautiful mountain lying slightly over 820m above sea levels (asl) and flanked by jungle-covered peaks rising to more than 1,400m. Bukit Busing around 1,300m and Mudung or Bukit Batu Bora around 1,400m are the highest peaks not far from this area.

To be exact, Usun Apau Plieran is located at the Upper Plieran (Sungai Plieran) and Sungai Tiyut (a tributary of Plieran river).

There are a few old longhouse sites at these areas such as Long Ampan Aing (to the western ear, Ampan Aing in Kenyah enunciation sounded like Abanang or Ampan Ayng, hence Sungai Abanang or Abanine), Long Bora (Sungai Bora), Long Taa, Ka Laeh, Lolau Mabo and Lidung Jelo. Long Ampan Aing and Lidung Jelo were the most important of the Kenyah Badeng settlements in Plieran in the early 1820s.

You will easily notice a variety of local fruit trees along the Plieran river bank with the most common being local fruit such as durian, rambutan, pulasan, bamboo, terap, langsat, 'eman', 'nanga' or sago palm (Eugeissona utilis), 'Mali' and 'bua' alim' (wild mango) when you take a boat ride from Plieran bridge at Long Ampan Aing, Long Bora, Long Taa, Ka Laeh to Lidung Jelo (upstream). All these crops were planted by the Kenyah Badeng people in 1820s-1900s the Penan in Plieran acknowledged that.

== Lidung Jelo ==
Discover what it is like in Lidung Jelo, Ka Laeh and Long Ampan Aing with local Kenyah touring some of the oldest longhouse sites famous landmarks and history. Lidung Jelo (also known as Lidong Jelor / Jilor) is a completely remote Kenyah's longhouse settlements deep into the mountainous interior near the border with North Kalimantan and located by the Plieran river bank, Belaga division of Sarawak. There are many local fruit trees which still grows wild in these old settlement areas. This place is important because it is one of the earliest and biggest settlements of Badeng/Madangs that is used to be their last stronghold, culture, heritage and a thriving center of Kenyah life as well as a major migration route from Belaga to Baram and vice versa at the very heart of Usun Apau Plieran Highlands. It takes about 35 minutes boat ride to get to Lolau Mabo from Lidung Jelo, which is located at upper Plieran.

== Mudung Batu Bora ==
The Batu Bora mountain range is a sandstone range lying between the Plieran river and the great Usun Apau Plateau to the north, or about 3.5 kilometers from the Plieran river to the south. The main Batu Bora mountain is 1,500m high and dominates the upper Plieran valley. The mountain forms a great massif. While in the south-east of the range is the secondary formation of Mudung Batu Bora, a great ridge 1,300m high with a series of jagged rocks sticking out along the top like teeth. Mudung or Bukit Batu Bora is also known by the Kenyah name as Mudung Bora, which refers to white (white as cotton) with low clouds hanging over the mountain. A day-trip climbs to the 1,500m Mudung Bora summit can be organized and the old route will give climbers a taste of the Plieran Range terrain to offer a great challenge for mountain climbing enthusiasts. It is possible to climb Mudung Batu Bora, but this is for a planned expedition, experience guides, mountaineering gears and a few porters will be needed.

== Climate ==
The mountainous inland region extends from Sarawak's watershed boundary with East/North Kalimantan. This region is generally over 725 metres above sea levels with substantial areas exceeding 1,400 metres. Stand about 2,378 feet above sea level, the climate in Apau Plieran is quite pleasant, owing to its medium high elevation, it can become quite chilly in the morning and the evening. The temperature in the upper Plieran is usually about 3-4 degrees Celsius lower than the temperature in the lowland area. The average temperature ranges from 20 to 26 °C (68 to 79 °F) with the lowest temperatures between November and February. The temperature seldom exceeds 29 °C (84 °F) even during the warmest part of the year.

== How to get there ==
Usun Apau Plieran is accessible from Bintulu by 4WD along the logging road. Travel to Usun Apau Plieran involves a six (6) hours 4WD drive from Bintulu to Belaga, using the Bintulu-Bakun trunk road and the road to Bakun / Murum Dam. From the Murum's Dam junction passing along the logging road and palm oil plantation roads, it takes about 2–3 hours to reach the Usun Apau Plieran the Badeng Madangs Highlands or the estimated distance from Murum Dam junction to Usun Apau is about 80 km.

A variety of other treks included 4–5 days long trails leading to North Kalimantan (with overnight stops in the primary rainforest nearby Upper Hulu Plieran river, Medang river and Upper Iwan river(the border with North and East Kalimantan)).

== Neighbouring settlements & rivers include ==
- Lio Matoh 18 kilometres (11.2 mi) northeast
- Long Tungan 15 kilometres (9.3 mi) northeast
- Metalun resettlement 1.3 kilometres (0.8 mi) eastwest
- Sungai Sut 5.6 kilometres (3.5 mi) northwest
- Sungai Weng 6.3 kilometres (3.9 mi) north
- Sungai Data 9.7 kilometres (6.0 mi) northeast
- Sungai Tebokan 10 kilometres (6.2 mi) east
- Sungai Danum 8 kilometres (5.0 mi) south
