= British Borneo =

1840s–1984 British territories in northern Borneo

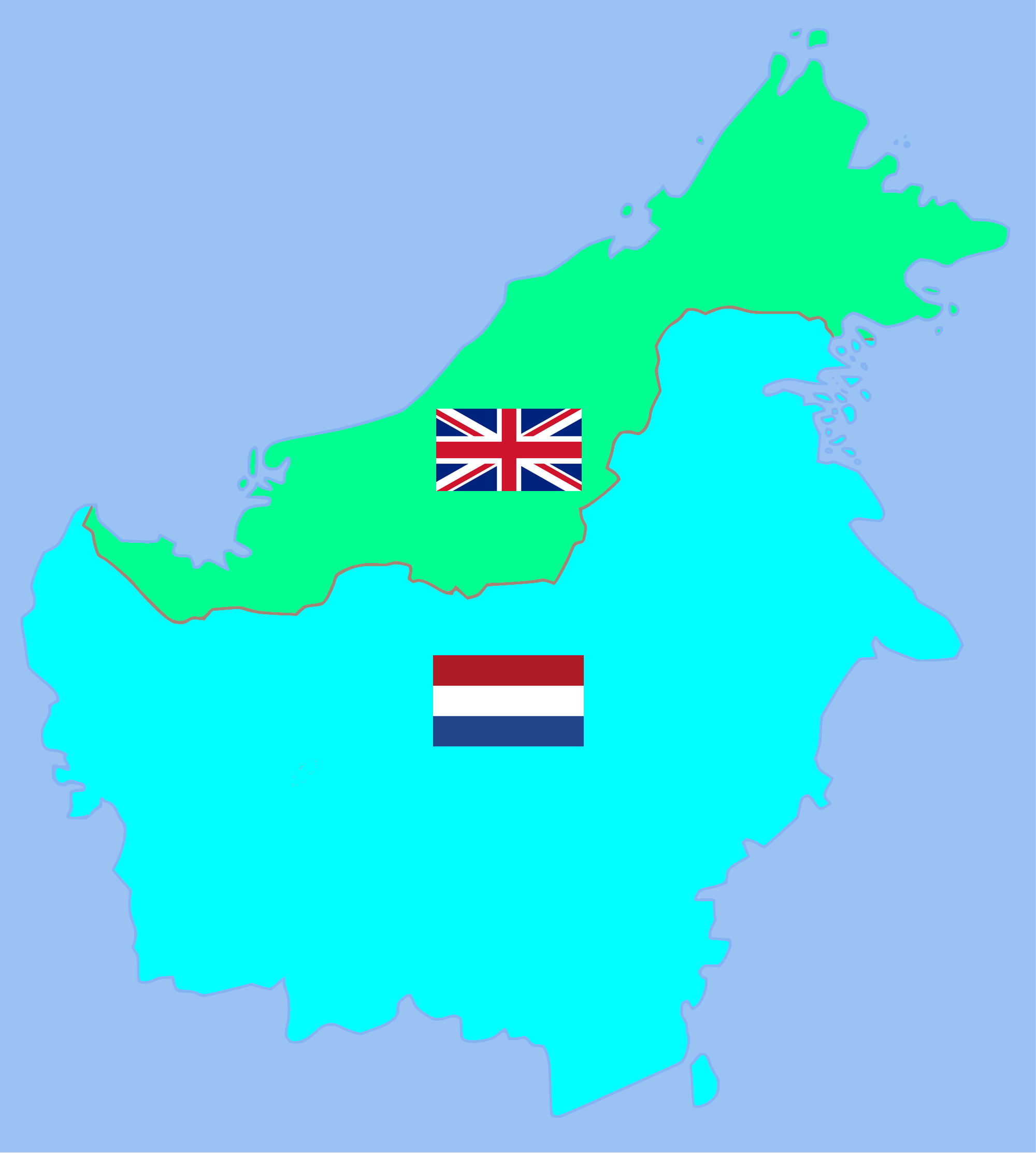
British Borneo Dutch Borneo

British Borneo comprised the four northern parts of the island of Borneo, which are now the country of Brunei, two Malaysian states of Sabah and Sarawak, and the Malaysian federal territory of Labuan. During the British colonial rule before World War II, Sarawak was known as the Raj of Sarawak (1841–1946), Sabah was known as North Borneo (1881–1946), and Labuan was known as the Crown Colony of Labuan (1848–1946). Between World War II and their independence from Britain, Sarawak became the Crown Colony of Sarawak (1946–1963) whereas Sabah and Labuan combined to form the Crown Colony of North Borneo (1946–1963). The Kingdom of Brunei (1888/1906–1984) was a protectorate of the United Kingdom since the 1888/1906 Protectorate Agreement, and was known as British Protectorate State of Brunei.

== Catholic missions ==
Around 1322, the first Christian mission to arrive in northern Borneo was by the Italian Odoric of Pordenone (also mentioned variously as Odorio, Odoric or Odorico Mattiussi). Further, in 1567, North Borneo received another two Jesuit missionaries from the Kingdom of Portugal but was interrupted by the Dutch in 1600, and in 1587, another two Franciscan missionaries from the Spanish East Indies. In 1687, a Theatine missionary named Antonino Ventimiglia was commissioned by Pope Innocent XI to preach Christianity in Borneo, he further lived on the eastern coast of northern Borneo for five years, marking the further chapter of Christian missions within northern Borneo despite earlier struggles to reach the local indigenous natives.

The Congregation for the Evangelisation of Peoples decreed on 27 August 1855 the erection of the northern part of the island of Borneo into an independent prefecture of North Borneo and Labuan and entrusted it to Carlos Cuarteroni, a Spaniard. Cuarteron was originally a sea-captain and had vowed, after escaping great peril, to devote himself to the evangelisation of Borneo. He landed at Labuan in 1857, in company with several missionaries who deserted him in 1860. Although alone in the island of Labuan, Cuarteroni continued his labours. At length, seeing that isolation made him powerless, he went to Rome in 1879 to request that the Propaganda place the mission in charge of an institute. From Rome, Cuarteroni went to Spain, where he soon died.

The island of Labuan has an area of 30 square miles (78 km^{2}) and contains 6,800 inhabitants; it is an important shipping station between Singapore and Hong Kong. The prefect Apostolic lives at Labuan. The stations served are Labuan and Kuching (Sarawak), the two most important towns. Outside of these two places where the missionaries live ten stations are visited: Sibu, Kanowit, Igan, Oya, Mukah, Baram, Papar, Jesselton, Putatan, and Sandakan. According to the "Missions-Atlas" of P. Streit, the statistics of the Catholic mission in the early 20th century were: 19 regular priests, 2 lay brothers, 15 sisters; 8 churches; 20 chapels; 16 catechists; 14 schools with 740 pupils; 2,600 baptisms; about 1,000 catechumens.

== British power ==
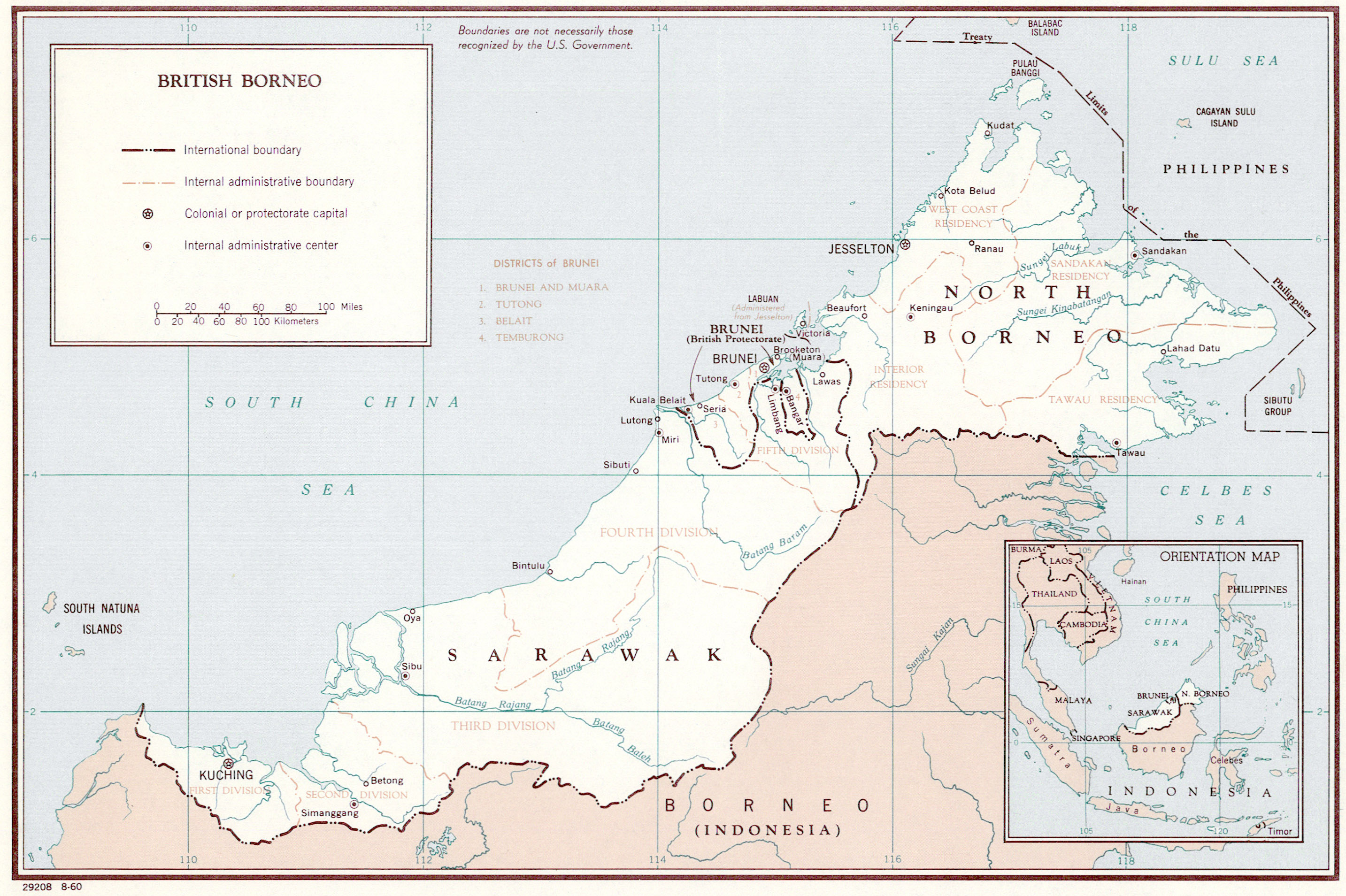
Map of British Borneo in 1960

The British had obtained the island of Labuan in 1846; they gradually extended their power over the petty rulers of the northern part of Borneo until, in 1888, the British protectorate of North Borneo was formally acknowledged. English speaking missionaries being desired in the British part of Borneo, the Propaganda (19 March 1881) confided the mission of North Borneo and Labuan to the Society for Foreign Missions of Mill Hill, from England. The first prefect Apostolic appointed under the new administration was Thomas Jackson. The society continued in charge of the mission.

During the Second World War, the British realised they were unable to defend the colony from the powerful Imperial Japanese Navy. They destroyed the airfields, and especially the oil fields there and in Brunei before the Japanese landed on 16 December 1941. The small British forces surrendered. In 1943, the Chinese population of about 50,000 rebelled against Japan and seized some towns. They were overwhelmed with many executed. Australia sent special operation forces, which trained and armed local militia units and aided the landing of an Australian division in June 1945. Japanese forces numbered about 31,000, and held out until October 1945, long after the Emperor had surrendered.

=== Diagram ===
Evolution of Malaysia
