= Baram District =

Historical district in northern Sarawak, Malaysia

Baram District was a historical administrative district in northern Sarawak, Malaysia. The district covered the interior basin of the Baram River and functioned under the Baram District Council from 1957 until its reorganization and renaming as the Marudi District Council in 1991. Today, the area that once constituted Baram District corresponds mainly to the modern Marudi District, together with the sub‑districts of Long Lama and Bakong. The region remains culturally significant and geographically vast, forming one of the largest interior areas of northern Sarawak.

== History ==
Formal local administration in the Baram interior began with the establishment of the Baram District Council on 1 January 1957 under the Local Authority Ordinance (Cap. 117). At the time of its creation, the council administered a territory of more than 22,000 km².

On 1 January 1991, the Baram District Council was officially renamed the Marudi District Council, following state‑level administrative restructuring. Although the administrative term "Baram District" ceased to be used thereafter, the name continues in common usage for the region encompassing the Baram River basin.

== Geography ==
The wider Baram region is geographically reflected today in the area of the federal parliamentary constituency P.220 Baram, which spans 22,075 km². This makes it one of the largest parliamentary constituencies in Malaysia.

The region consists of:

- extensive lowland and highland tropical rainforest
- major tributaries feeding the Baram River
- remote settlements accessible mainly by timber roads and river transport
- interior terrain rising toward the Kelabit Highlands

== Administration ==
The territory formerly known as Baram District is today administered through:

- Marudi District
- Telang Usan District
- Beluru District (established from the former Marudi District)

These areas were all historically within the jurisdiction of the Baram District Council.

== Demographics ==
Although the district no longer exists administratively, demographic patterns can be inferred from the population of the Baram parliamentary constituency, which recorded a total population of 63,499 in 2020.

Ethnic composition (MyCensus 2020):

- Bumiputera: 94.6%
- Chinese: 4.9%
- Others: 0.4%
- Indian: 0.1%

The region is home to a variety of Indigenous groups, including the Kenyah, Kayan, Penan, Kelabit, Berawan, Iban, and others, as documented in the council’s historical records.

== Culture ==
Baram is known for its cultural diversity and longhouse traditions. Longhouses remain a defining feature of social life, and visitors are often welcomed into community events and rituals. The Baram region also features prominent Indigenous languages, including Kayan, Kenyah, Kelabit, and Penan. Annual cultural festivals such as the Gawai Dayak are widely celebrated and reflect the region’s Dayak heritage.

== Economy ==
The Baram region historically relied on subsistence agriculture, hunting, riverine trade, and forest resources. Today, the economy includes:

- small‑scale farming
- timber and forestry‑related activities
- eco‑tourism and cultural tourism
- government administration in Marudi

== Transportation ==
The main transport hub of the historical Baram District is the town of Marudi, which is accessible by:

- Marudi Airport (short‑haul flights to and from Miri)
- partially upgraded road link between Miri and Marudi
- Longboat transport along the Baram River for upriver communities

Remote villages in the upper Baram remain reachable primarily by river.

== See also ==
- Marudi District
- Telang Usan District
- Miri Division
- Baram (federal constituency)
