= Lidung Jelo =

- Location within Borneo
- Coordinates: 2°39′02″N 114°47′25″E
- Country: Malaysia
- State: Sarawak
- Administrative Division: Belaga
- Elevation: 750 m (2,460 ft)

Population (2016)
  - Total: 25

Lidung Jelo (also known as Lidong Jelor) was an ancient remote Kenyah's longhouse settlement in the mountainous interior located by the Plieran river bank, Belaga division of Sarawak. There are many local fruit trees like durian, alim, terap, rambutan and langsat which still grows wild in these old settlement areas.

This place is very important in Kenyah oral history because it is one of the earlier settlements that is used to be the most strategic and stronghold for the Kenyah in the Plieran area.

== History ==
Lidung Jelo, at Usun Apau Plieran (Pliran / Plieran / Pleiran / Peliran) is a Kenyah Badeng old village settlement in 1920s, Belaga district. This place was visited a few times in the late 1930s, 1940s, 1977, 1980s, 1989 and 2006 by a few groups of Kenyah Badeng to verify the old longhouse sites. Due to the great pressure from the Baram Resident Officer, in 1891, practically all the inhabitants of the Baram had accepted the Rajah's government and acknowledged it by the payment of any tax, called door-tax of two dollars per family. The Kenyahs, do not feel needed of any such protection, were less ready to accept the Resident's proposals. First of all, they desired peace, or at any rate less warfare, and it was possible to convince them that this result might be achieved by pointing to other districts such as the Rejang and Jenalong (Tubau), with whose affairs they had some acquaintance. Most of them eventually start to move from Lidung Jelo go to upper Plieran and entered the Medang river (a tributary of the hulu Plieran river) adjacent to the river that flows into the Teboken river then Data river and settled at the confluence of the so-called Long Teboken. Three (3) years later they went to Long Benalui (not far from Mudong Alan) another tributary to Data river and not far from the Silat river in Baram district.

Although the whole area was thickly covered with undergrowth we can easily find several of the old pile upright in the ground and painted most of it in yellow. The site was more than 350 feet long with large fruit trees to mark the ends of the settlement. In those days the Kenyahs buried their dead in hollow tree-trunks twenty to thirty feet high, on which they craved patterns called 'uduk'. The dead man's body with all his earthly treasures would be placed inside and a heavy stone laid on top. It is easy for the trunks to fall as there was no one looking after the burial site for a long time.

During our recent expedition to the village site in Lidung Jelo, Usun Apau Plieran, we found more than three upright piles (a real hardwood called 'kayu merang') of old houses in a straight line still remained in the ground.

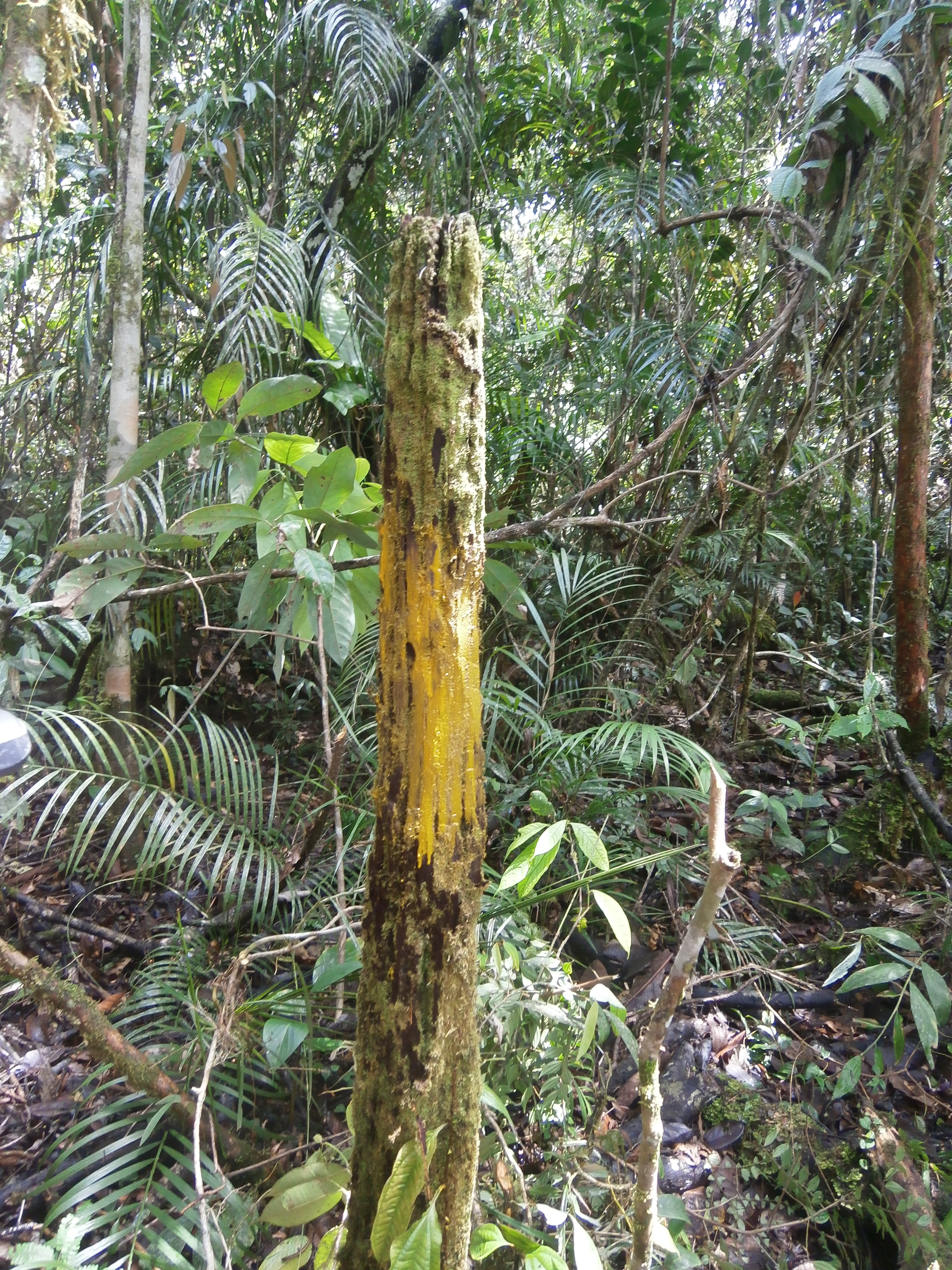
Pile #1 of an old house found in Lidung Jelo, Plieran

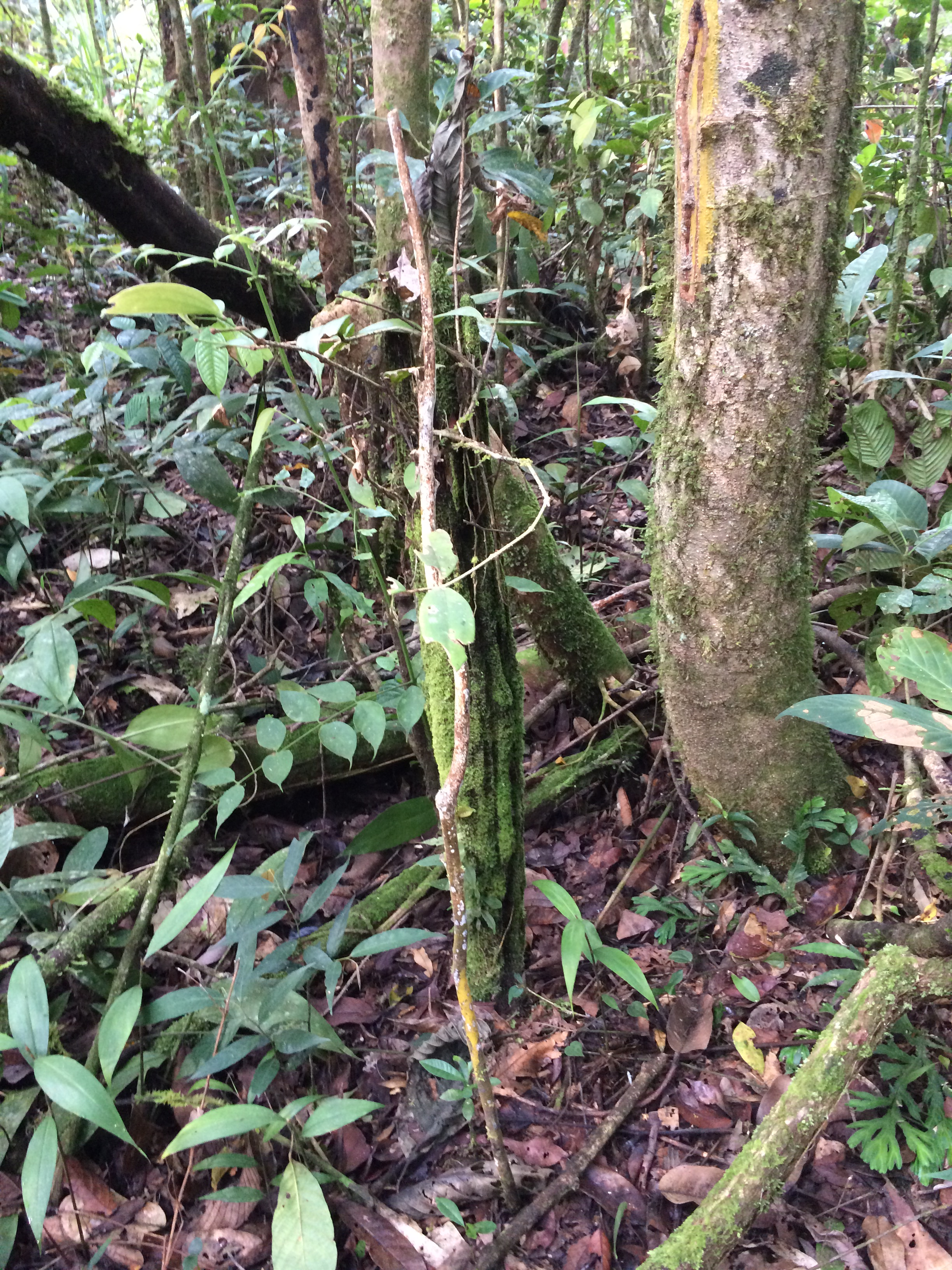
a pile #3 of an old house in Lidung Jelo, Plieran

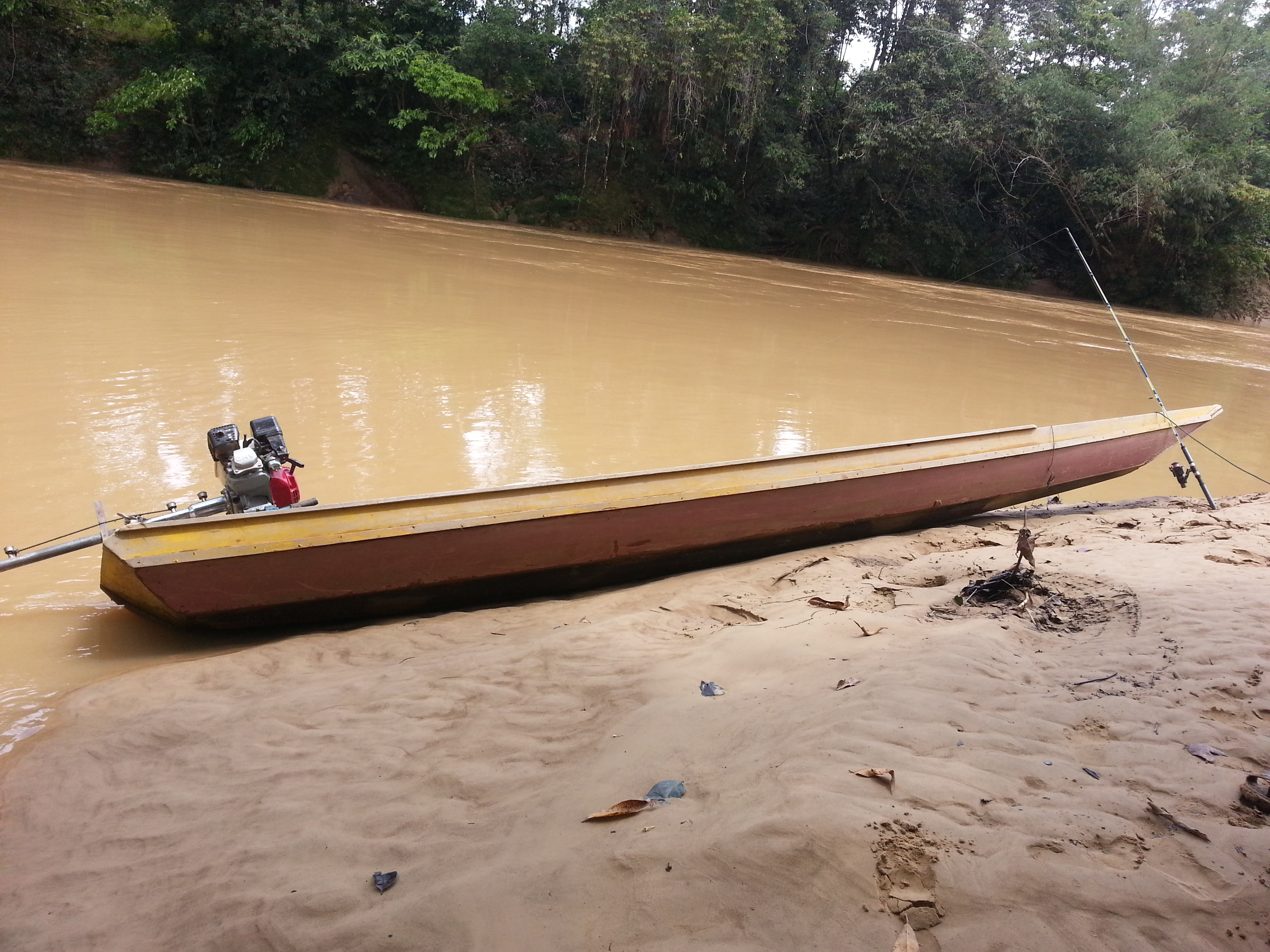
small boat & water levels rise after heavy rain overnight at Lidung Jelo

Mount Batu Bora
- Batu Bora
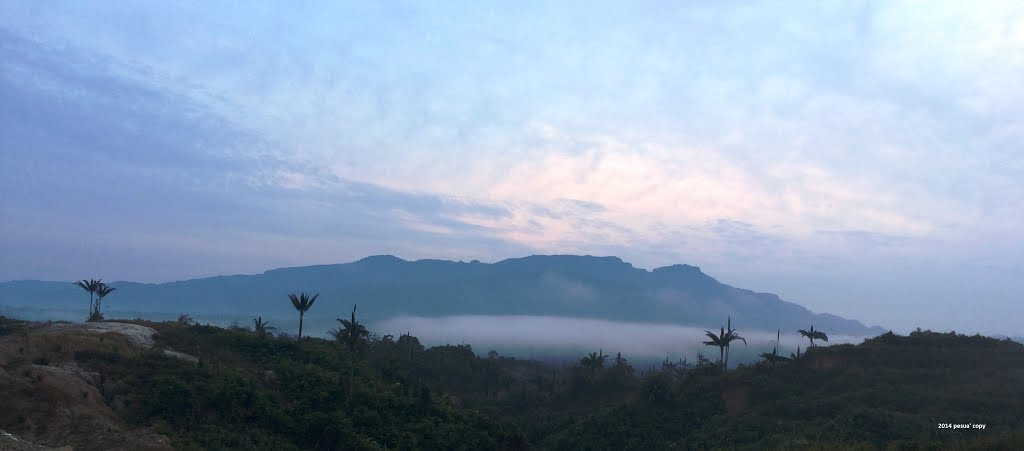

Highest point
- Elevation: 1,450 m (4,760 ft)

Geography
- Location: Usun Apau Plieran
- Parent range: Apau Plieran
