= Bornean pygmy shrew =

Conservation status
- Data Deficient (IUCN 3.1)

Scientific classification
- Kingdom: Animalia
- Phylum: Chordata
- Class: Mammalia
- Order: Eulipotyphla
- Family: Soricidae
- Genus: Suncus
- Species: S. hosei

Binomial name
- Suncus hosei (Thomas, 1893)
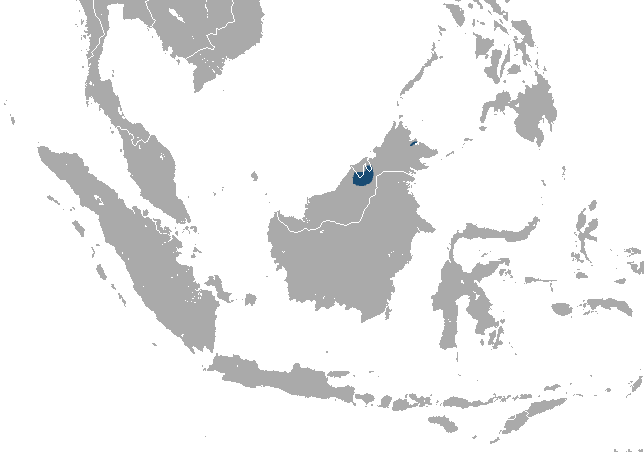
- Bornean pygmy shrew range

Species of mammal

The Bornean pygmy shrew (Suncus hosei) is a species of shrew in the family Soricidae. It was named for zoologist Charles Hose.

== Distribution ==
This shrew is endemic to the international island of Borneo, particularly in northern Sarawak and northeastern Sabah states of Malaysia. It may be more widespread and occur in the nation of Brunei, and in northern Kalimantan province of Indonesia.

Its natural habitat is subtropical and tropical dry forests. Older taxonomies have included it in the Etruscan shrew (Suncus etruscus), but they are distinctly different species.

== Conservation ==
It was listed as an IUCN Red List Vulnerable species since 1996, until it was relisted as a Data Deficient species in 2008.

The exact threats are unknown. If it is forest dependent, it is threatened by habitat loss from: habitat conversion to agricultural plantations, especially for palm oil; logging; and fires. It is not known, from botanical collecting, to have any protected populations within nature reserves or parks of the three countries.
