= Kampung Setapang =

- Location within Borneo
- Coordinates: 4.13333°N 114.43333°E
- Country: Malaysia
- State: Sarawak
- Administrative Division: Miri
- Elevation: 205 m (673 ft)

Kampung Setapang is a settlement in the Miri division of Sarawak, Malaysia. It lies approximately 536.8 kilometres (334 mi) east-north-east of the state capital Kuching.

Neighbouring settlements include:

- Rumah Itoh 1.9 kilometres (1.2 mi) south
- Rumah Puyut 3.7 kilometres (2.3 mi) west
- Rumah Mauh 3.7 kilometres (2.3 mi) west
- Rumah Penghulu Nyaloi 4.1 kilometres (2.5 mi) northwest
- Rumah Sungai Babi 4.1 kilometres (2.5 mi) northwest
- Rumah Likong 4.1 kilometres (2.5 mi) southwest
- Kampung Engkabang 5.2 kilometres (3.2 mi) southwest
- Rumah Sibat Selijau 5.2 kilometres (3.2 mi) northwest
- Kampung Buang 5.6 kilometres (3.5 mi) east
- Rumah Beji Selijau 5.6 kilometres (3.5 mi) north
