= Fort Hose =

Fort in Sarawak, Malaysia

Coordinates: 4.1771°N 114.3247°E

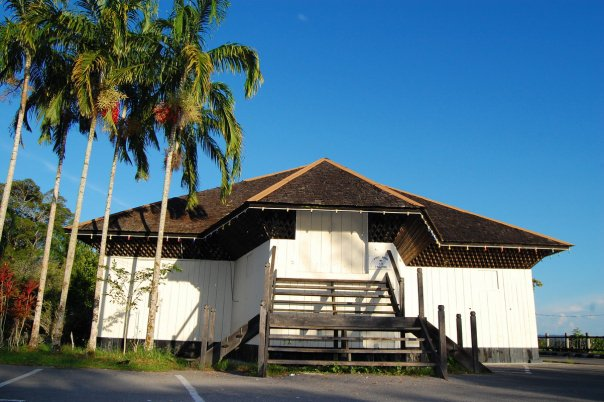
- Interactive map of the Fort Hose area

General information
- Status: Completed
- Type: Fort
- Location: Jalan Kubu, Marudi, Sarawak, Malaysia
- Completed: Constructed in 1898 and rebuilt in 1996
- Owner: Government of Sarawak

Fort Hose is a historical fort situated in Marudi, Sarawak, Malaysia. It was built in 1898 by Charles Brooke, the second Rajah of Sarawak, to safeguard government activities in the area, and now serves as a museum.

== History ==
Fort Hose, strategically located on a hill overlooking the Baram River in the town of Marudi in northern Sarawak, is named after Charles Hose, a British colonial administrator and ethnologist, and nephew of George Hose, Bishop of Sarawak and Labuan. Hose entered the Sarawak civil service as a cadet in 1884, was assigned to the newly created eastern Baram District, recently ceded by the Sultan of Brunei to Charles Brooke, the second Raja of Sarawak, and was later promoted to Resident of Baram in 1891.

Hose had the fort built in 1898 as an administrative centre, and as a means to control rebellions against the Brooke administration and to safeguard government activities. It also served as accommodation for the Resident. In 1899, a peace accord was held at the fort between local ethnic tribes orchestrated by Hose.

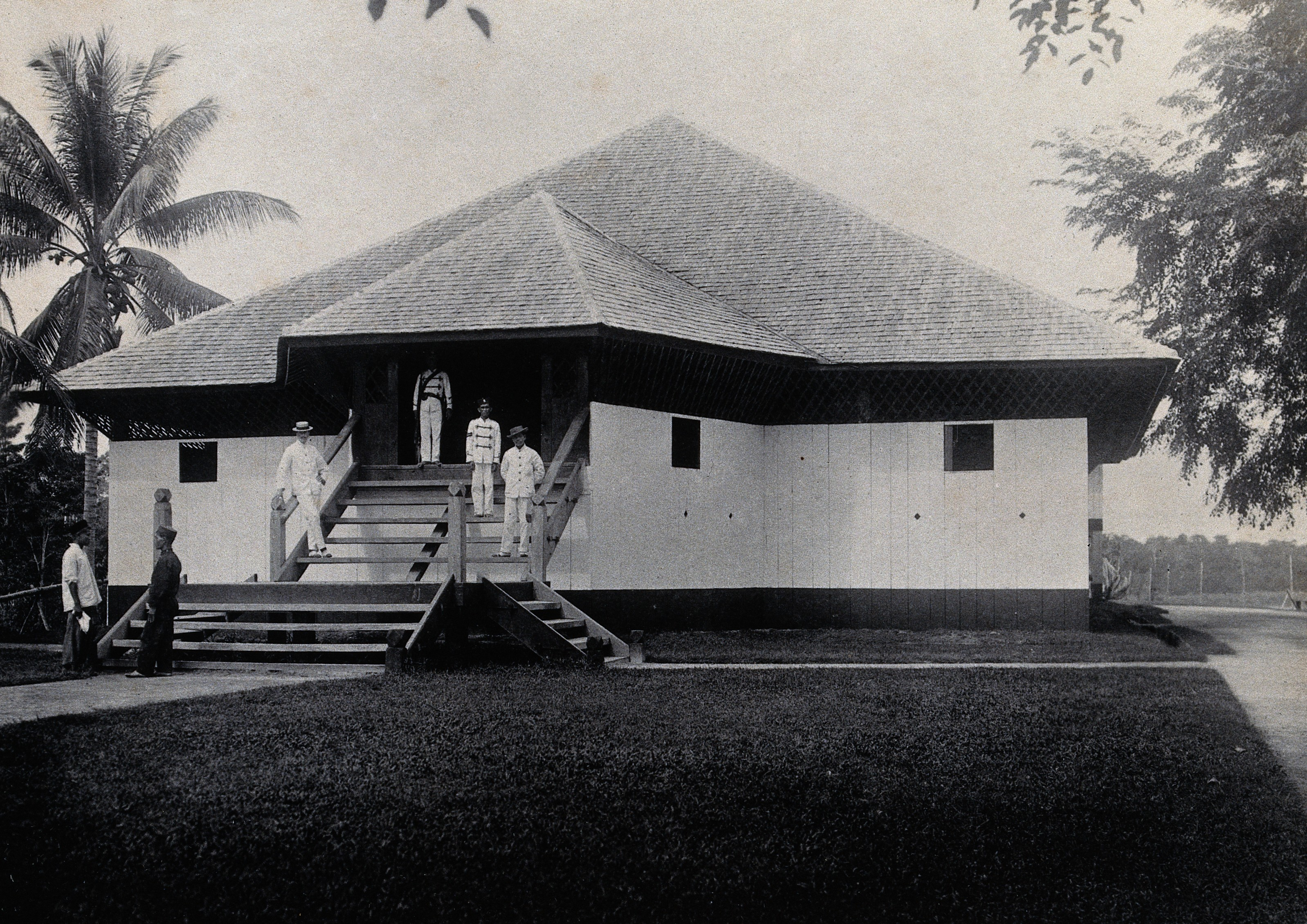
Fort Hose before it was destroyed by fire in 1994

In 1994, the fort was destroyed by fire and reconstructed at the same location as a replica of the original fort. On completion in 1996, the fort was converted into a museum.

== Baram District Museum ==
Known as the Baram District Museum, its collection includes photographs and exhibits relating to the cultural heritage of various local communities including the Kayan, Kenyah, Kelabit, and Penan people.

The building has been gazetted as a cultural heritage site under the Sarawak Cultural Heritage Ordinance (SCHO) 1993.

== See also ==
- List of Forts constructed during the Raj of Sarawak
