= Kampung Engkabang =

- Location within Borneo
- Coordinates: 4.1°N 114.4°E
- Country: Malaysia
- State: Sarawak
- Elevation: 132 m (433 ft)

Kampung Engkabang is a settlement in Sarawak, Malaysia. It lies approximately 531.7 kilometres (330 mi) east-north-east of the state capital Kuching.

Neighbouring settlements include:

- Rumah Likong 1.9 kilometres (1.2 mi) east
- Kampung Melikat 1.9 kilometres (1.2 mi) south
- Rumah Liman 1.9 kilometres (1.2 mi) south
- Rumah Sebatang 2.6 kilometres (1.6 mi) northwest
- Rumah Emang Brit 3.7 kilometres (2.3 mi) west
- Rumah Mauh 3.7 kilometres (2.3 mi) north
- Rumah Puyut 3.7 kilometres (2.3 mi) north
- Rumah Itoh 4.1 kilometres (2.5 mi) northeast
- Rumah Liyom Belasoi 4.1 kilometres (2.5 mi) southeast
- Kampung Setapang 5.2 kilometres (3.2 mi) northeast
