= Marudi Airport =

Marudi Airport Lapangan Terbang Marudi
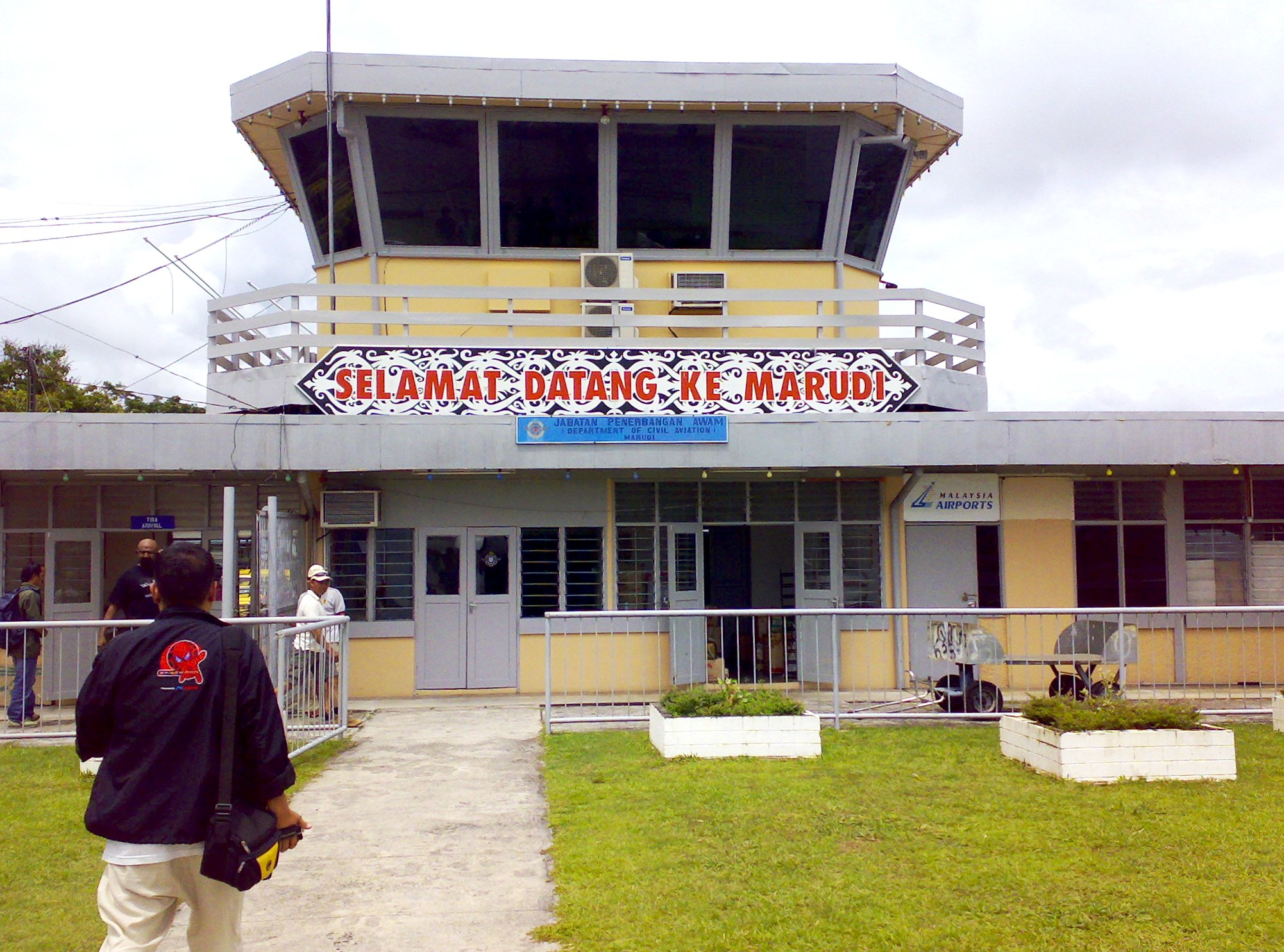
- IATA: MUR; ICAO: WBGM

Summary
- Airport type: Public
- Operator: Malaysia Airports Holdings Berhad
- Serves: Marudi, Sarawak
- Location: Marudi, Sarawak, Malaysia
- Time zone: MST (UTC+08:00)
- Elevation AMSL: 103 ft / 31 m
- Coordinates: 04°10′39″N 114°19′19″E

Map
- Location in East Malaysia

Runways
Direction	Length		Surface
Direction	m	ft	Surface
10/28	998	3,274	Asphalt

Statistics (2015)
- Passenger: 43,689 (▲6.4%)
- Airfreight (Tonnes): 356 (▲25.8%)
- Aircraft movements: 5,376 (▲12.4%)
- Source: official web site AIP Malaysia

Marudi Airport (IATA: MUR, ICAO: WBGM) is an airport in Marudi, Miri Division, Sarawak, Malaysia.

It has a 10/28 runway and its aircraft parking bay can handle a maximum of four de Havilland Canada DHC-6 Twin Otter aircraft at a time.

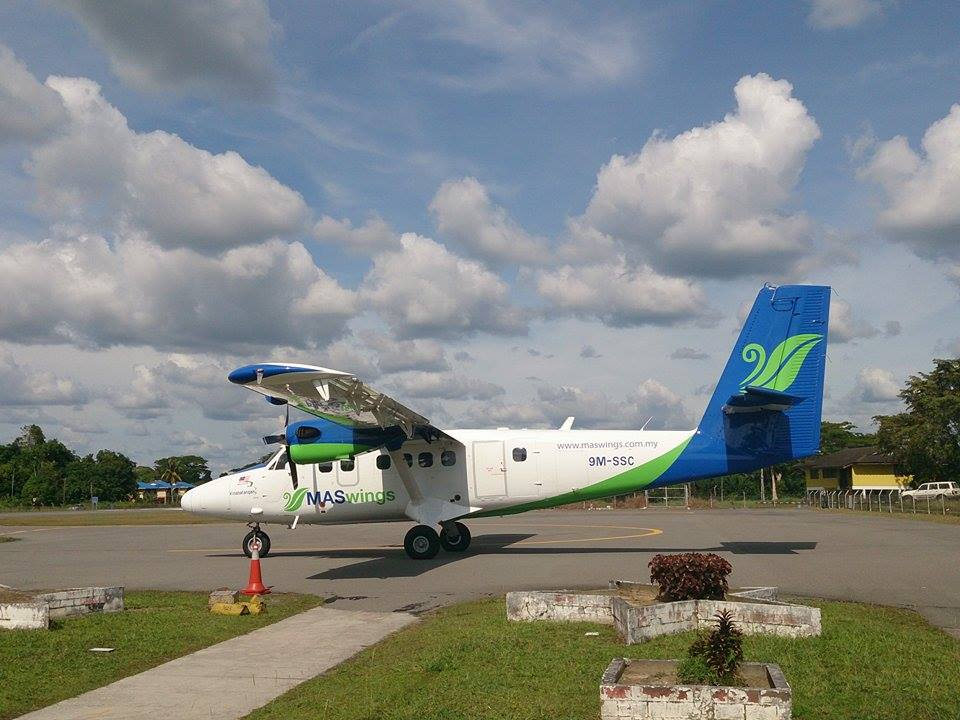
MASwings DHC 6-400 Twin Otter at Marudi Airport

== Airlines and destinations ==
Airlines	Destinations
AirBorneo	Bario, Long Akah, Long Banga, Long Lellang, Long Seridan, Miri

== Incidents ==
- 7 November 2012 — a de Havilland Canada DHC-6 Twin Otter (9M-MDO), operating as MASwings Flight 3592 from Miri to Marudi, veered left off the runway during its landing and ended up in a ditch. All 17 people on board survived.
- 27 August 2016 — a de Havilland Canada DHC-6-400 Twin Otter (9M-SSB), operating as MASwings Flight 3568 from Miri to Marudi, skidded left off the runway during its landing. All four passengers and two crew members on board survived. No casualties were reported.
