= Mount Batu Bora =

Mountain in Sarawak, Malaysia

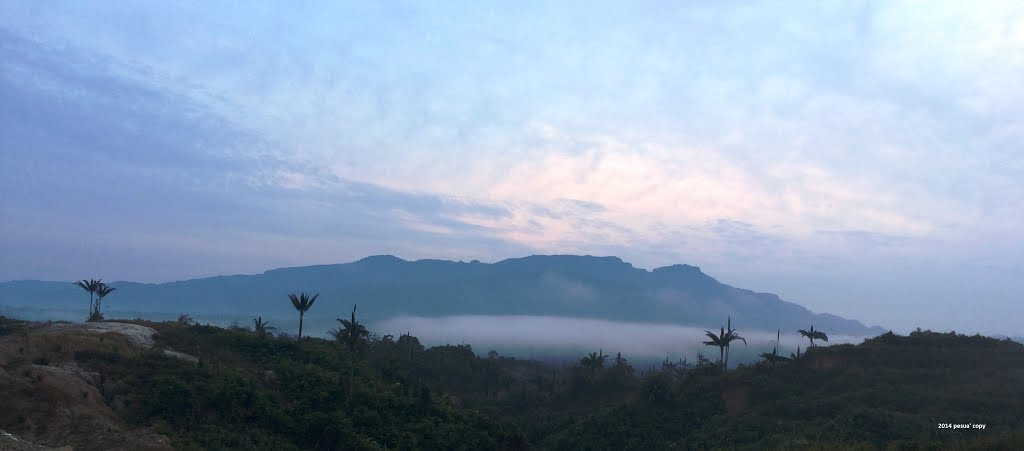
- Mudung Batu Bora seen from the Plieran area

Highest point
- Elevation: 1,465 m (4,806 ft)
- Coordinates: 2.7160°N 114.7160°E

Naming
- Native name: Mudung Batu Bora (Malay); Bukit Batu Bora (Malay)

Geography
- Location: Sarawak, Malaysia
- Parent range: Usun Apau area

Mount Batu Bora (Malay: Mudung or Bukit Batu Bora) is a mountain in the interior of Sarawak, Malaysia, in the Usun Apau area near the upper Plieran River. A modern gazetteer gives its elevation as 1,465 metres (4,806 ft) and places it at approximately 2.7160°N 114.7160°E.

The name Batu Bora appears on historical mapping of the Baram district produced by Charles Hose around 1900. Mid-20th-century exploration and geological literature on the Usun Apau Plateau and the Plieran River area also referred to the Batu Bora mountain range.

In current Sarawak administrative law, Bukit Batu Bora is used as a named landmark in district and divisional boundary descriptions.
