= Rumah Mauh =

- Location within Borneo
- Coordinates: 4.13333°N 114.4°E
- Country: Malaysia
- State: Sarawak
- Elevation: 159 m (522 ft)

Rumah Mauh is a settlement in Sarawak, Malaysia. It lies approximately 533.7 kilometres (332 mi) east-north-east of the state capital Kuching.

Neighbouring settlements include:

- Rumah Puyut 0 kilometres (0.0 mi) north
- Rumah Penghulu Nyaloi 1.9 kilometres (1.2 mi) north
- Rumah Sungai Babi 1.9 kilometres (1.2 mi) north
- Rumah Sebatang 2.6 kilometres (1.6 mi) southwest
- Kampung Setapang 3.7 kilometres (2.3 mi) east
- Kampung Engkabang 3.7 kilometres (2.3 mi) south
- Rumah Sibat Selijau 3.7 kilometres (2.3 mi) north
- Rumah Itoh 4.1 kilometres (2.5 mi) southeast
- Rumah Likong 4.1 kilometres (2.5 mi) southeast
- Rumah Emang Brit 5.2 kilometres (3.2 mi) southwest
