= Marudi District =

Coordinates: 3°40′0″N 114°45′0″E

Marudi
- District
- Seal

- Country: Malaysia
- State: Sarawak
- Seat: Marudi

Marudi is a district, in Miri Division, Sarawak, Malaysia. Its seat is the town of Marudi.
