= Charles Hose =

British colonial administrator, zoologist and ethnologist

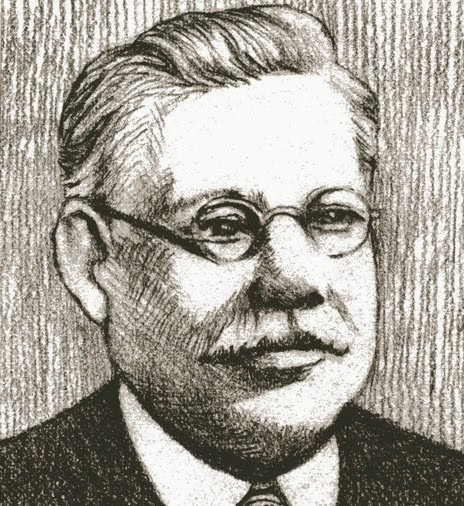
A portrait sketch of Charles Hose.

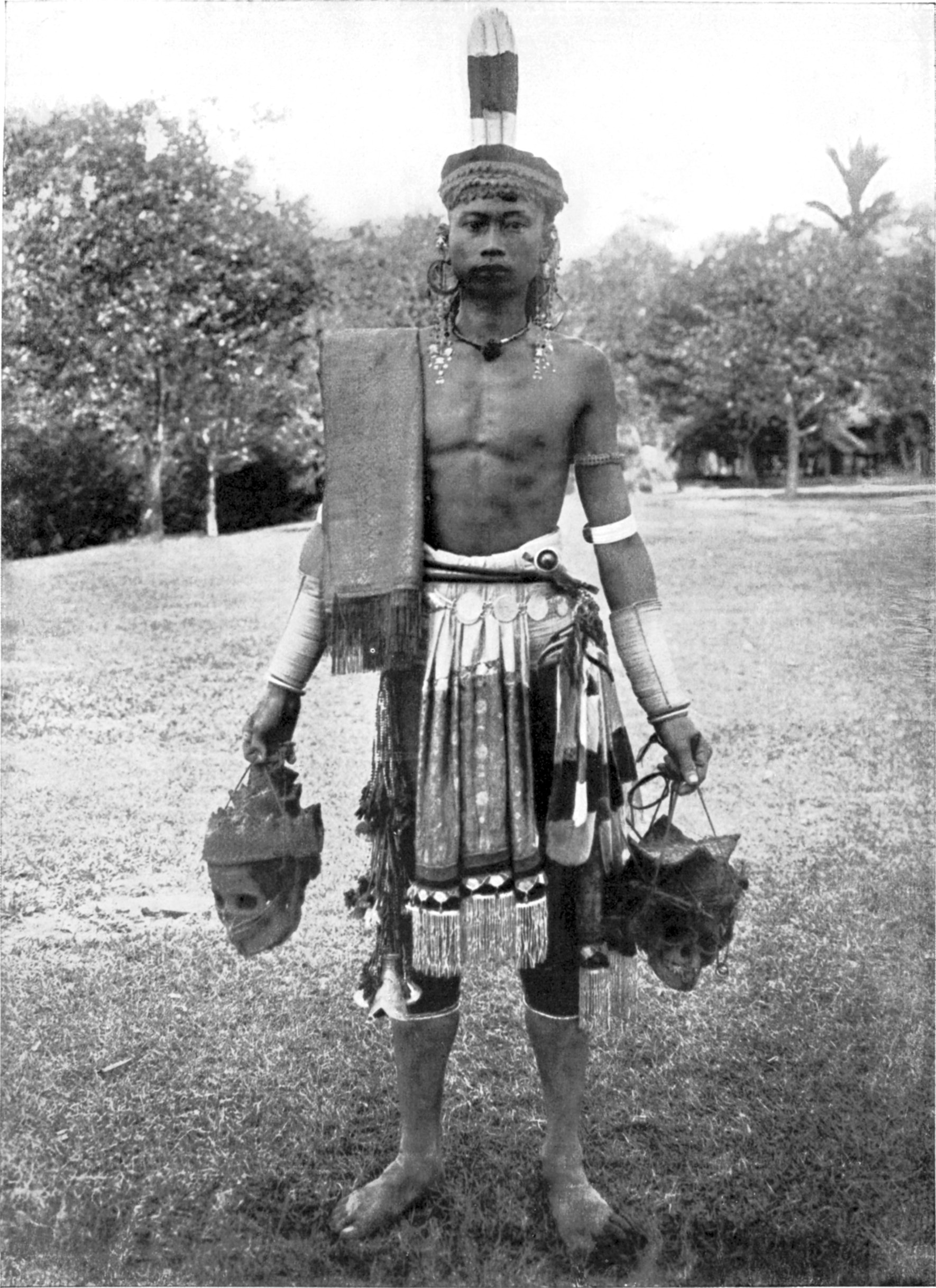
Dayak man in gala costume. Photographed by Charles Hose.

Charles Hose FRGS FZS DSc (12 October 1863 – 14 November 1929) was a British colonial administrator, zoologist and ethnologist.

== Life and career ==
Hose was the son of Rev. Thomas Charles Hose, grandson of Rev. Frederick Hose and nephew of the Right Rev. Bishop George Frederick Hose. He was born in Willian, Hertfordshire, England, and was educated at Felsted in Essex. Admitted to Clare College, Cambridge in 1882, he almost immediately migrated to Jesus College, and later left Cambridge without taking a degree. He was offered an administrative cadetship in Sarawak, where his uncle George Hose was the Anglican bishop, by the second Rajah, Sir Charles Brooke, which he took up in 1884. His large collection of ethnographic objects from Borneo was purchased by the British Museum in 1905.

Hose retired in 1907 and moved back to England. He visited Sarawak again in 1909 and 1920. During World War I, he served as superintendent of His Majesty's Explosives Factory in King's Lynn, Norfolk from 1916 to 1919.

Hose was a fellow of the Royal Geographical Society and a fellow of the Zoological Society of London. He was conferred an honorary Doctor of Science degree by the University of Cambridge in 1900 and made an honorary fellow of Jesus College in 1926.

Hose died on 14 November 1929 after an operation at a nursing home in Croydon, South London. He was interred at Bandon Hill Cemetery.

== Animal species named after Hose ==
Several species named to commemorate his work as zoologist:

Amphibians

- Hose's frog, Odorrana hosii found in Thailand, Malaysia and Indonesia
- Hose's tree frog, Philautus hosii endemic to Borneo: Indonesia and Malaysia prob. Brunei.
- Hose's toad, Pedostibes hosii, toad in Southeast Asia: Brunei, Indonesia, Malaysia, and Thailand

Birds

- Hose's broadbill, Calyptomena hosii endemic to Borneo.
- Black oriole, Oriolus hosii endemic to Borneo.

Fish

- Leptobarbus hosii (Regan 1906) from northern Borneo.

Mammals

- Hose's shrew or Bornean pygmy shrew, Suncus hosei endemic to Malaysia.
- Hose's pygmy flying squirrel, Petaurillus hosei endemic to Malaysia.
- Four-striped ground squirrel, Lariscus hosei endemic to Borneo.
- Hose's palm civet, Diplogale hosei endemic to Borneo: East Malaysia and Brunei.
- Fraser's dolphin, Lagenodelphis hosei
- Hose's leaf monkey, Presbytis hosei endemic to Borneo.

Insects

- The stick insect: Hermagoras hosei Kirby, 1896 - endemic to Borneo.
- The cockroach: Dorylaea hosei (Shelford, 1909).

== Places named after Hose ==
Place

- Hose Mountains on Borneo.
- Fort Hose on Borneo Located in Marudi in Sarawak

== Bibliography ==
Books authored by Charles Hose include:

- A descriptive account of the mammals of Borneo (1893)
- The Pagan Tribes of Borneo (a Description of Their Physical Moral and Intellectual Condition with Some Discussion of Their Ethnic Relations) (with William McDougall) (1912)
- Natural Man: A Record from Borneo (1926)
- Fifty Years of Romance and Research - Or a Jungle-Wallah at Large (1927)
- The Field Book of a Jungle-Wallah: Being a Description of Shore, River and Forest Life in Sarawak (1929)

== See also ==
- Category:Taxa named by Charles Hose
