= Rumah Sebatang =

- Location within Borneo
- Coordinates: 3.76667°N 114.13333°E
- Country: Malaysia
- State: Sarawak
- Administrative Division: Miri
- Elevation: 75 m (246 ft)

Rumah Sebatang is a settlement in the Miri division of Sarawak, Malaysia. It lies approximately 487.3 kilometres (303 mi) east-north-east of the state capital Kuching.

Neighbouring settlements include:

- Rumah Radin 1.9 kilometres (1.2 mi) north
- Rumah Pagan 2 kilometres (1.2 mi) south
- Rumah Kuala Bok 2.6 kilometres (1.6 mi) northeast
- Rumah Puti 3.1 kilometres (1.9 mi) southwest
- Rumah Sabindang 4.7 kilometres (2.9 mi) southwest
- Long Maligam 5.3 kilometres (3.3 mi) southeast
- Long Ajoi 5.9 kilometres (3.7 mi) east
- Rumah Tama Sidut 6.9 kilometres (4.3 mi) southeast
- Rumah Jampi 9.3 kilometres (5.8 mi) northwest
- Rumah Liban 9.5 kilometres (5.9 mi) north
