= Marudi =

Town in Sarawak

Marudi Pekan Marudi
- Town and district capital
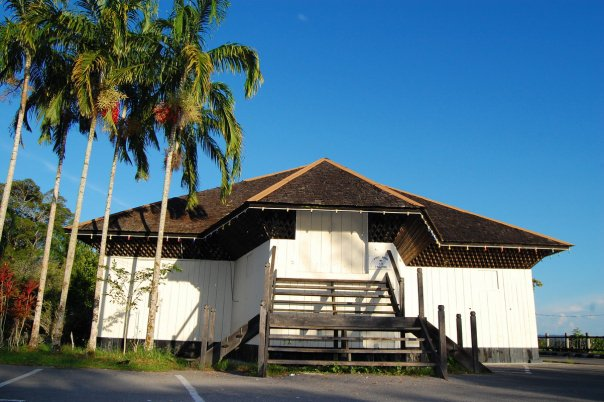
- Baram Regional Museum (formerly Fort Hose)

- Seal
- Nickname: Claude Town (Brooke Administration)

- Location within Malaysia
- Coordinates: 4°11′0″N 114°19′0″E
- Country: Malaysia
- State: Sarawak
- Division: Miri
- District: Marudi

Government
  - District Officer: Belayong Anak Pok

Area
  - Total: 21,634.0 km^{2} (8,352.9 sq mi)

Population (2010)
  - Total: 90,100
- Demonym: Marudian
- Time zone: UTC+8 (MST)
  - Summer (DST): Not observed
- Postal code: 9805x
- International dialling code prefix: 085 (landline only)
- Vehicle registration plate prefix: QM (for all vehicles except taxis); HQ (for taxis only)
- Website: www.marudidc.org

Marudi is a town in the Malaysian state of Sarawak, and is a part of the division of Miri. It is the seat of Marudi District, and is located on the banks of Baram River, about 100 kilometres (62 mi) upstream from the river mouth. Marudi was the administrative centre of the northern region of Sarawak before Miri was established in 1910. Marudi is considered as the cultural heart of the Orang Ulu, the highland tribes of Sarawak. It is also a transit gateway to Kelabit Highlands and Gunung Mulu National Park, a UNESCO World Heritage Site.

== History ==
Up until 1882, the Baram area was ruled by the Sultan of Brunei. By that time, the Sultan was having a lot of trouble keeping these vicious tribes in the Baram region under control with their ongoing feuds and bloodletting. Towards the end of the 1800s, the conflicts and the growth of tribal territories had gotten dangerously near to his capital, endangering his personal safety. In this about 10,000 square miles (26,000 km^{2}) domain, the Sultan's power had never previously been used. The Malays never traveled into the interior of Baram out of dread of the Kayan tribe's fury.

Since of this, the Sultan was willing to give up control of the region when Rajah Brooke extended his rule into the higher regions of Baram in exchange for a one-time payment of six thousand dollars annually, which the Foreign Office in England approved since they thought it was a reasonable price for the transfer. By 1883, the Sultan of Brunei (Abdul Momin) ceded the Baram region (including Miri) to Charles Brooke.

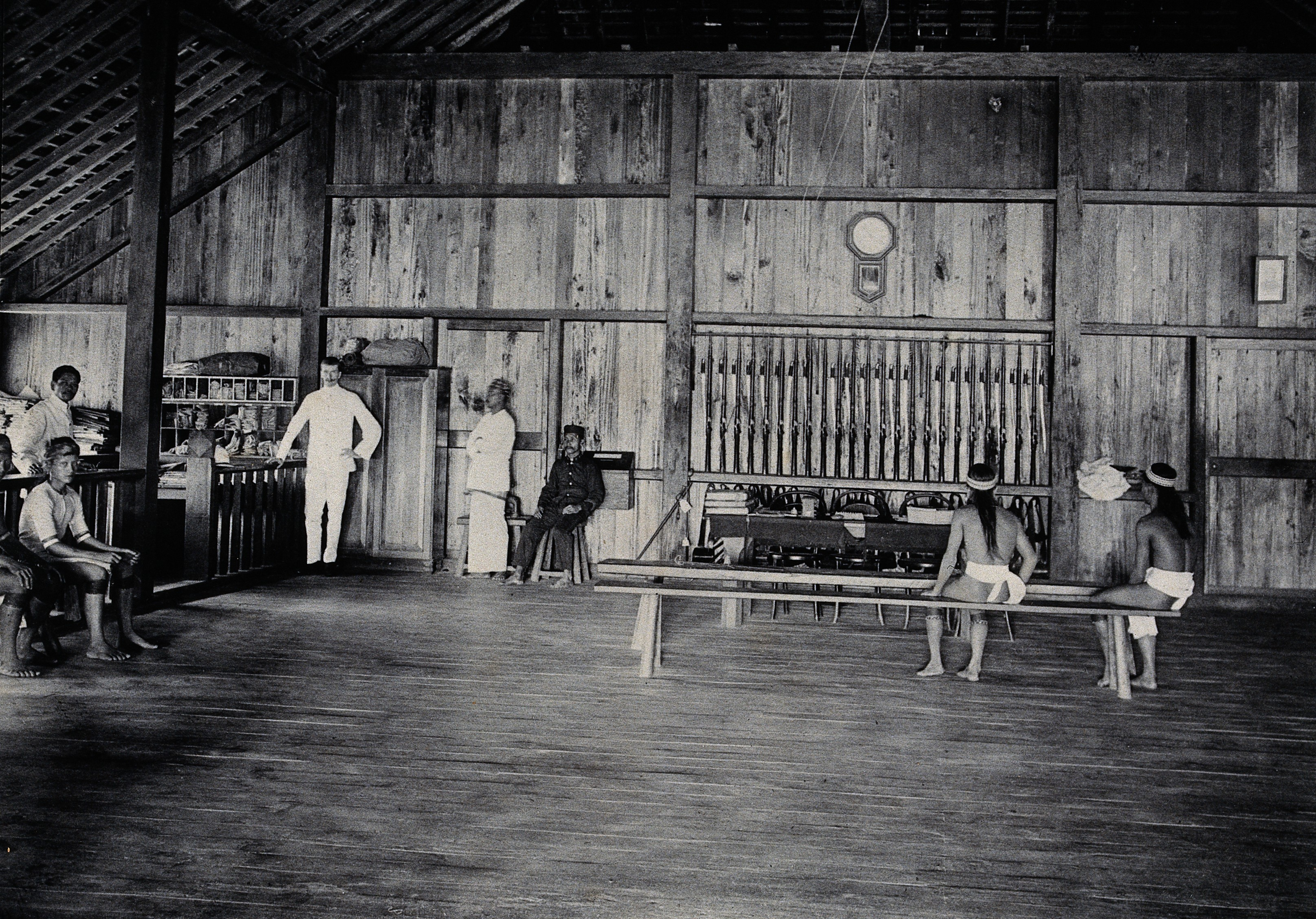
Charles Hose's photograph of the fort's interior in c. 1896

The fourth division of Sarawak was immediately created with the installation of Mamerto George Gueritz as the first Resident of the Division. A fort was built in at Marudi, 43 km (27 mi) to the east of Miri. The area was then named Claudetown in honour of Claude Champion de Crespigny, Resident of the Third Division when he died in 1884, and it became the administrative centre of the division. The administration was helped by two junior officers, 30 rangers, and a few native police.

Charles Hose became Resident of Baram District in 1891 and the fort in Marudi was renamed Fort Hose. As a result of his concerns about his people' savage practices, Charles Brooke resolved to put a stop to the headhunting and blood feuds permanently. He organised a competition amongst all the tribes and started cockfighting among them, but the losing tribes didn't take it well, and further fighting broke out. Boat-racing was chosen instead, and Resident Charles Hose designated Marudi as the venue for a regatta.

In 1895 and 1896, the Brooke administration organised an expedition to Usun Apau Plieran to punish the Kenyah people (including the Badeng people, a sub-tribe of Kenyahs) living there, who were alleged to have been responsible for the deaths of a Malay, a Chinese trader, and several Iban people. In October 1896, Saba Irang, the headman of the Badeng people, came to Claudetown to seek refuge and make peace with the Brooke administration. Hose decided to organise a peace conference at his fort in April 1899 to “encourage the Madang (Badeng) to be loyal subjects and to ensure a friendly recognition by them by the Baram people". The conference was attended by 6,000 people. This peace conference also led to creation of the Baram Regatta, a long boat race competition among the natives that continues to be held in the present day.

== Administration ==
The town is the administrative centre of Marudi District, a district in the Miri Division of Sarawak, governed by Marudi District Council, which encompasses the districts of Marudi and Mulu, and small portions of the districts are under Miri City Council such as Ba'kelalan.

== Economy ==
James Brooke noted in 1840s that the Baram region was famous for its production of camphor. In the same period, Hugh Low described that the Brunei rulers controlled much of the trade through power and allegiance and control of external trade through the river mouths. In 1851, Spenser St. John noted that there was a relatively developed network of exchange relationships going on for some years before his arrival. Amongst the items of trade were camphor, wax, gutta-percha, and india-rubber. By 1872, Noel Denison noted the items of trade in this region were cinnabar, earth oil, birds' nests, gutta, gold, and diamonds. He also noted ten Chinese traders had opened a bazaar along the Tinjar River and had forced Brunei dealers out of business.

When the Baram region was ceded to the Brooke regime in 1882, the first Resident of Baram described the area as "a state of stagnation as a result of the murders, piracies and uncertainty of protection afforded by the various chiefs". Marudi was the major administrative and trade centre from 1882 to 1902.

== Transportation ==
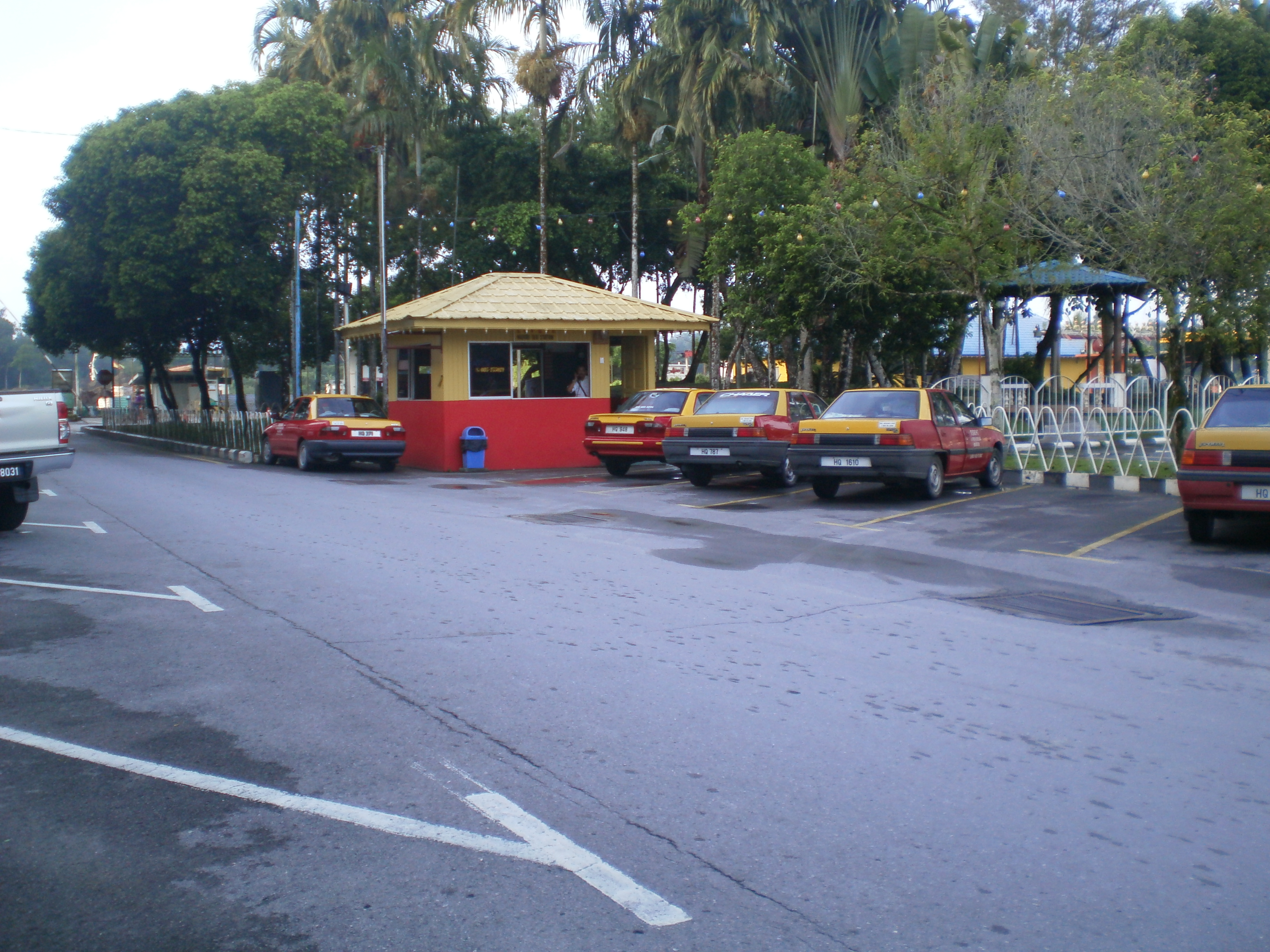
The town's taxi stand in 2012

=== Land ===
It was officially announced on 13 October 2017, that the 43.2 kilometres (26.8 mi) road project that connects Miri with Marudi is far ahead of its initial 30-month timeline for completion. The road upgrade was supposed to be 12.53% finished by 25 September, however it is already 30.80% finished, or 18.27% ahead of schedule. The road link's poor state and increasing significance prompted the public to express great interest in its improvement, which started on 15 September 2016. The roads that connect Miri and Marudi passes through plantations, and occasionally have just one lane. The Marudi bridge, which has the length of 740 meters, costing RM116.5 million, commenced construction on 20 October 2022 and has been completed on 18 October 2024, which officially opened on 10 November 2024.

=== Air ===
Marudi is served by Marudi Airport (MUR) which is in the town. De Havilland Canada DHC-6s of MASwings fly to Miri up to nine times daily and serve Bario, Long Banga, Long Lellang, Long Akah and Long Seridan. The airport is a 10-minute (1 km; 0.62 mi) walk east from the centre. The airport and town center are only a short distance apart, a well-constructed pedestrian walkway runs beside the major route into town.

=== Water ===
According to SRB statistics, 66,174 passengers passed through the Marudi express boat passenger terminals in total in 2013. However, five years later, in 2018, there were just 3,171 passengers documented, and in 2021, there were none at all. In March 2021, the final express boat service was discontinued. Express boat services were reinstated in 2022 for Marudi and Sungai Tutoh, Baram, to give the locals there more transportation alternatives.

In 2023, the crocodile population in Marudi enjoys intimidating and terrifying its human neighbors, particularly those who reside in riverfront settlements, given the decreased number of boats that travel the Baram River. Residents depend on these watercraft to get around when they resided in Baram. Back then, the river had once been packed with express vessels, sampans, and various other water vessels, and how it is now much quieter, which may be the reason why more crocodiles have been observed within villages, especially longhouses.

== Geography ==
=== Climate ===
Marudi has a tropical rainforest climate with heavy to very heavy rainfall year-round.

Climate data for Marudi
Month	Jan	Feb	Mar	Apr	May	Jun	Jul	Aug	Sep	Oct	Nov	Dec	Year
Mean daily maximum °C (°F)	30.1 (86.2)	30.0 (86.0)	30.6 (87.1)	31.2 (88.2)	31.4 (88.5)	31.4 (88.5)	31.1 (88.0)	31.1 (88.0)	31.1 (88.0)	30.8 (87.4)	30.7 (87.3)	30.5 (86.9)	30.8 (87.5)
Daily mean °C (°F)	26.7 (80.1)	26.7 (80.1)	27.0 (80.6)	27.6 (81.7)	27.7 (81.9)	27.6 (81.7)	27.3 (81.1)	27.3 (81.1)	27.3 (81.1)	27.2 (81.0)	27.1 (80.8)	26.9 (80.4)	27.2 (81.0)
Mean daily minimum °C (°F)	23.3 (73.9)	23.4 (74.1)	23.5 (74.3)	24.0 (75.2)	24.0 (75.2)	23.8 (74.8)	23.5 (74.3)	23.5 (74.3)	23.6 (74.5)	23.6 (74.5)	23.5 (74.3)	23.4 (74.1)	23.6 (74.5)
Average rainfall mm (inches)	287 (11.3)	177 (7.0)	195 (7.7)	229 (9.0)	254 (10.0)	204 (8.0)	178 (7.0)	235 (9.3)	240 (9.4)	307 (12.1)	328 (12.9)	338 (13.3)	2,972 (117)
Source: Climate-Data.org

== Infrastructure ==
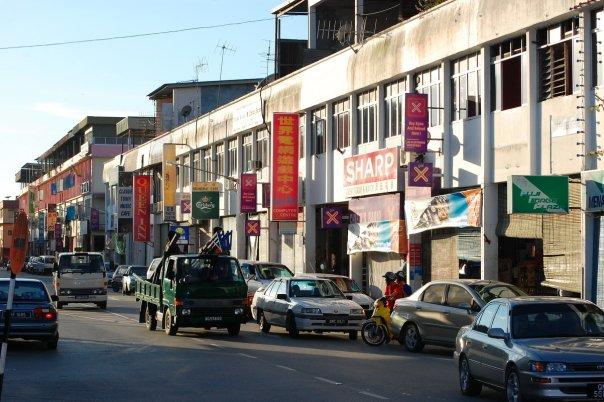
Downtown Marudi in 2010

The majority of the structures in Marudi's grid-planned town center are multi-story shophouses. This is a typical example of urban planning in Malaysia prior to the emphasis moving to more dispersed suburban projects. The town has its own fire station.

=== Education ===
The Chung Hua School was initially founded in 1926, originally within the temple's grounds. In 1926, the primary school welcomed its first students. With only fifteen students, the first headmaster was Goh Jing Chew, and the sessions were initially held in the rear of the tealple. The first wooden building atop a hill was finished in 1936. The wooden structure was destroyed in 1973 due to damage, and a new structure was built in its place. Sim Kheng Hong graced the inauguration ceremony on 4 November 1973.

=== Places of interest ===
Fort Hose, a wooden fort built during the Brooke administration, is situated near the town center and directly off the road that leads from the airstrip to the town center. The fort's construction was finished in 1891, and it stood until a fire destroyed it in 1994. The building that is seen now is a renovated model that debuted in 1997. Charles Hose is honoured by the fort's name. Today, the Baram District Museum is located within the fort. The location overlooks the Baram River.

Marudi Tua Pek Kong is situated within Marudi's commercial center. The temple has weathered three big fire catastrophes in the town's history without any damage. Back then, Chinese businessmen arrived in Southeast Asia to do business, they erected a temple dedicated to Tua Pek Kong. This would be their regular meeting spot going forward. The Baram River is just next to the temple. The lone Chinese temple in Marudi was constructed in 1891. Though relatively tiny in comparison to other Chinese temples in the area, the temple remains an essential component of the town.

The Marudi Market is one among the sites along Jalan Kampung Cina. In the morning, the market is generally bustling with activity. The ground floor is home to the neighborhood market. On the first level, there is a food court as well. The majority of the shops provide a variety of rice and noodle meals, coffee, and tea.

According to Datu Dr. Penguang Manggil, the Marudi Waterfront expansion project and the first stage of a planned three-star hotel should be finished by 2025. The Sarawak Economic Development Corporation (SEDC) will construct an RM35 million, 90-room hotel on the site of the former Marudi Rest House. The present waterfront, which was overflowing at the most recent Baram Regatta 2023, will be gradually extended to 1.5 km (0.93 mi), making it one of the longest in the state. The esplanade expansion and slope protection would cost around RM35 million each, according to the Department of Irrigation and Drainage.

=== Baram Ragatta ===
When Charles Brooke selected Marudi as the administrative hub for Sarawak's northern district after racial unrest in Baram, the town was then known as Claude Town. The locals enthusiastically embraced the offer made by the then-resident, Charles Hose, to hold a boat race between all the rival races in order to put an end to the carnage. In 1899, the Baram Regatta was initiated as a means of promoting peace among the many tribes. The event drew in over 6,000 participants from Baram, including Ibans, Kenyahs, Kayans, Narums, Melanaus, Malays, and Madangs. Since that point, the regatta has grown to be a yearly occasion that attracts visitors of all ethnicities from Baram and other places.

== Gallery ==
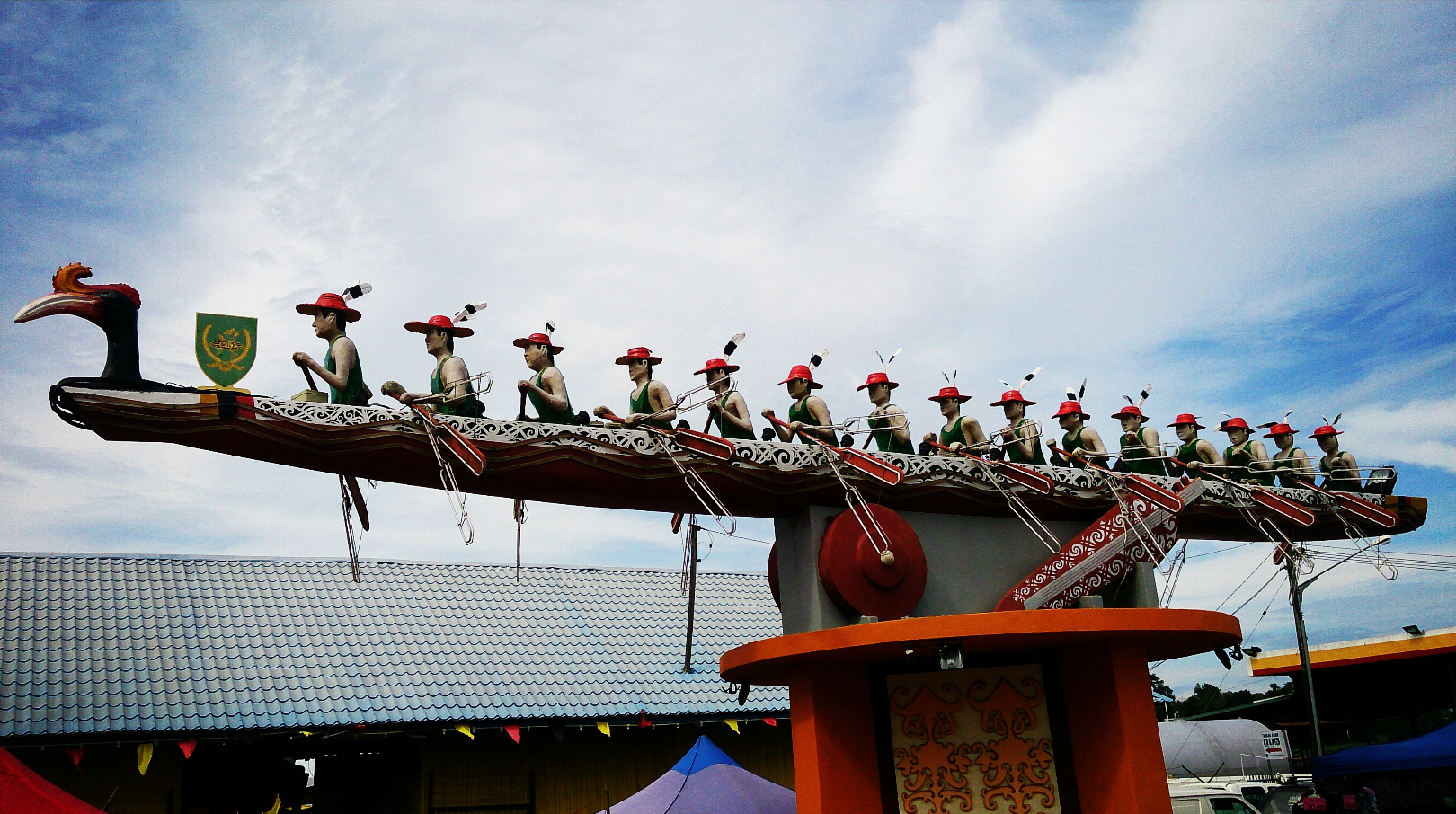
Baram Regatta Statue

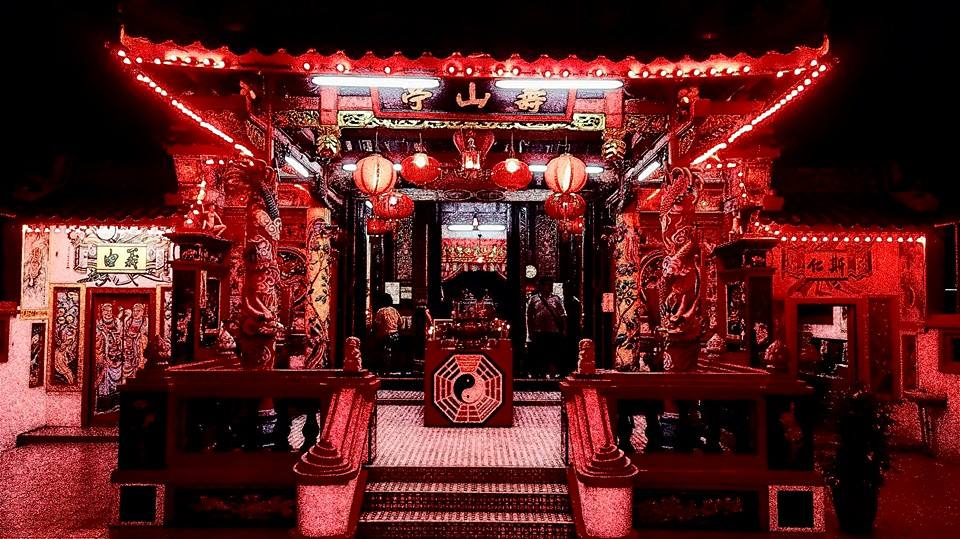
Marudi Tua Pek Kong

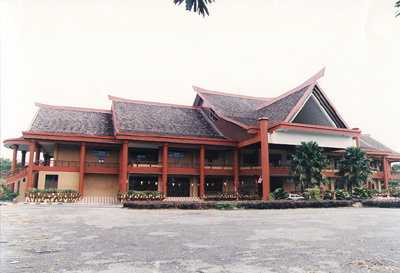
Marudi Lecture Hall

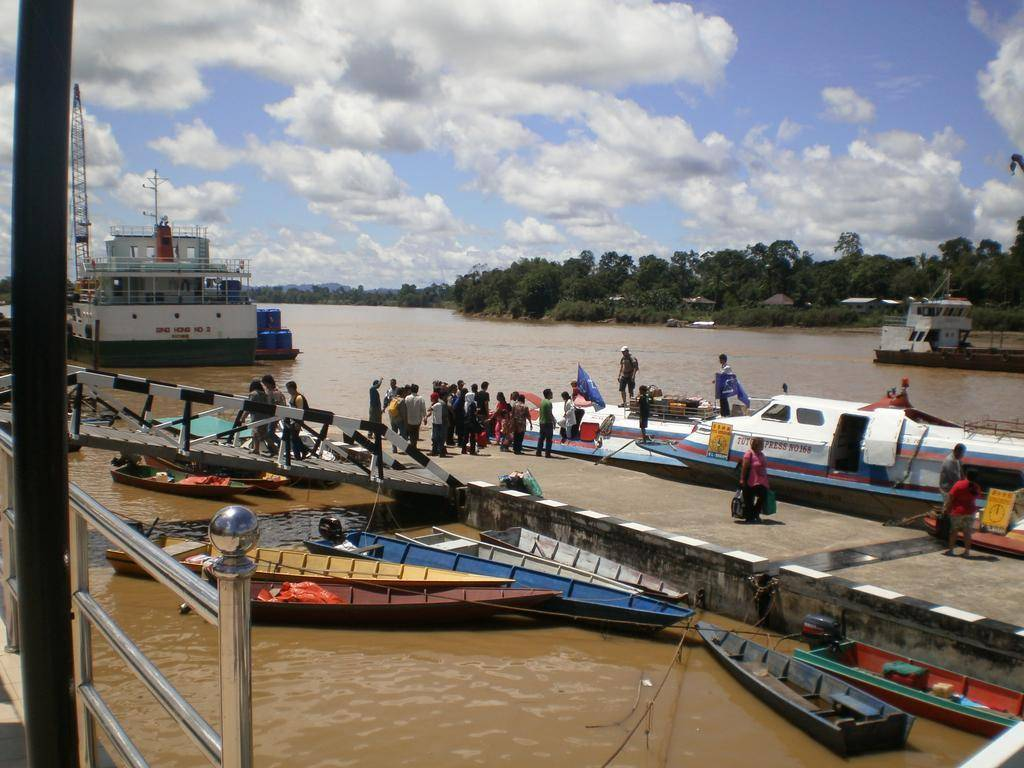
Marudi Wharf Terminal

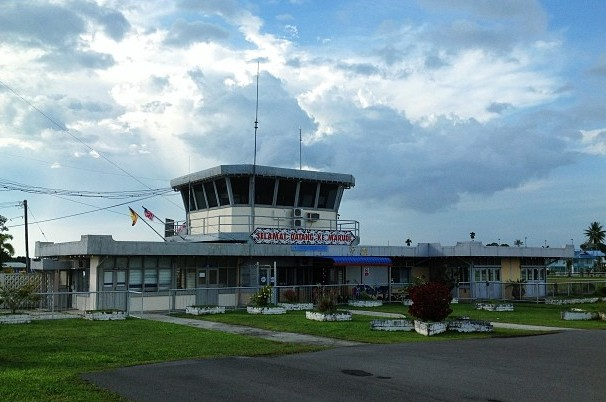
Marudi Airport
