= Rainforest =

Type of forest with high rainfall

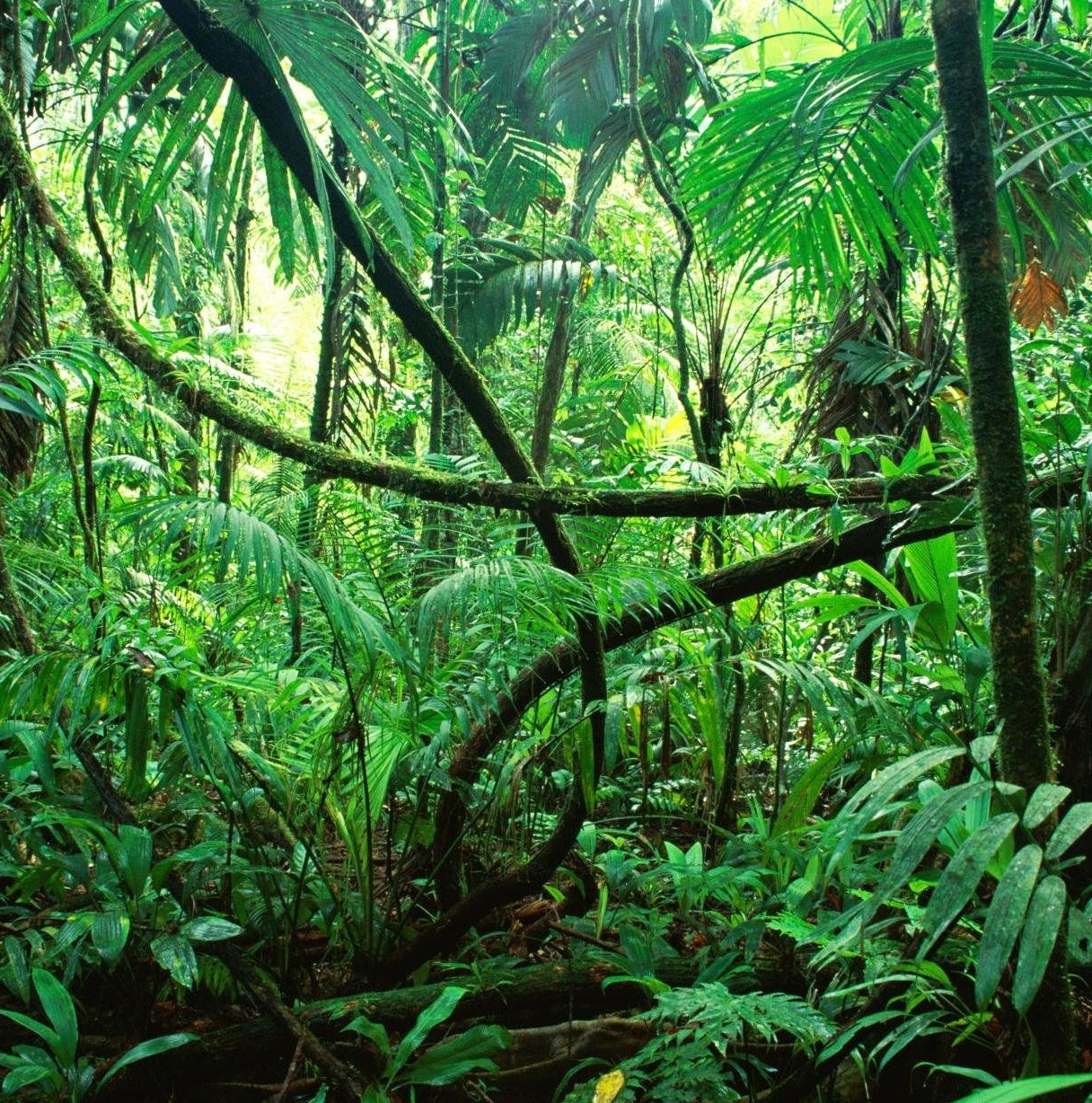
A thick rainforest in Chiapas, Mexico

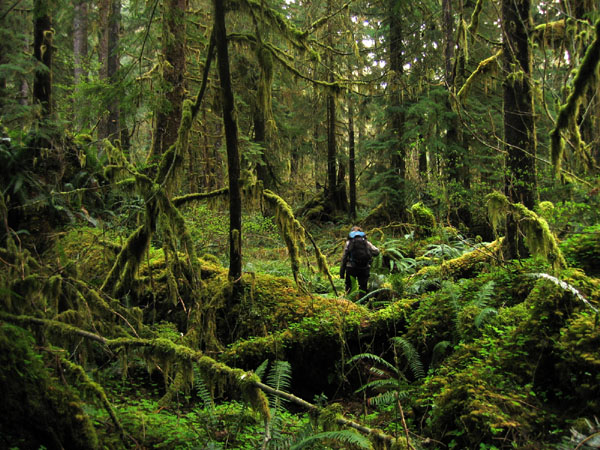
Olympic rain forest located at Olympic Peninsula, Washington state

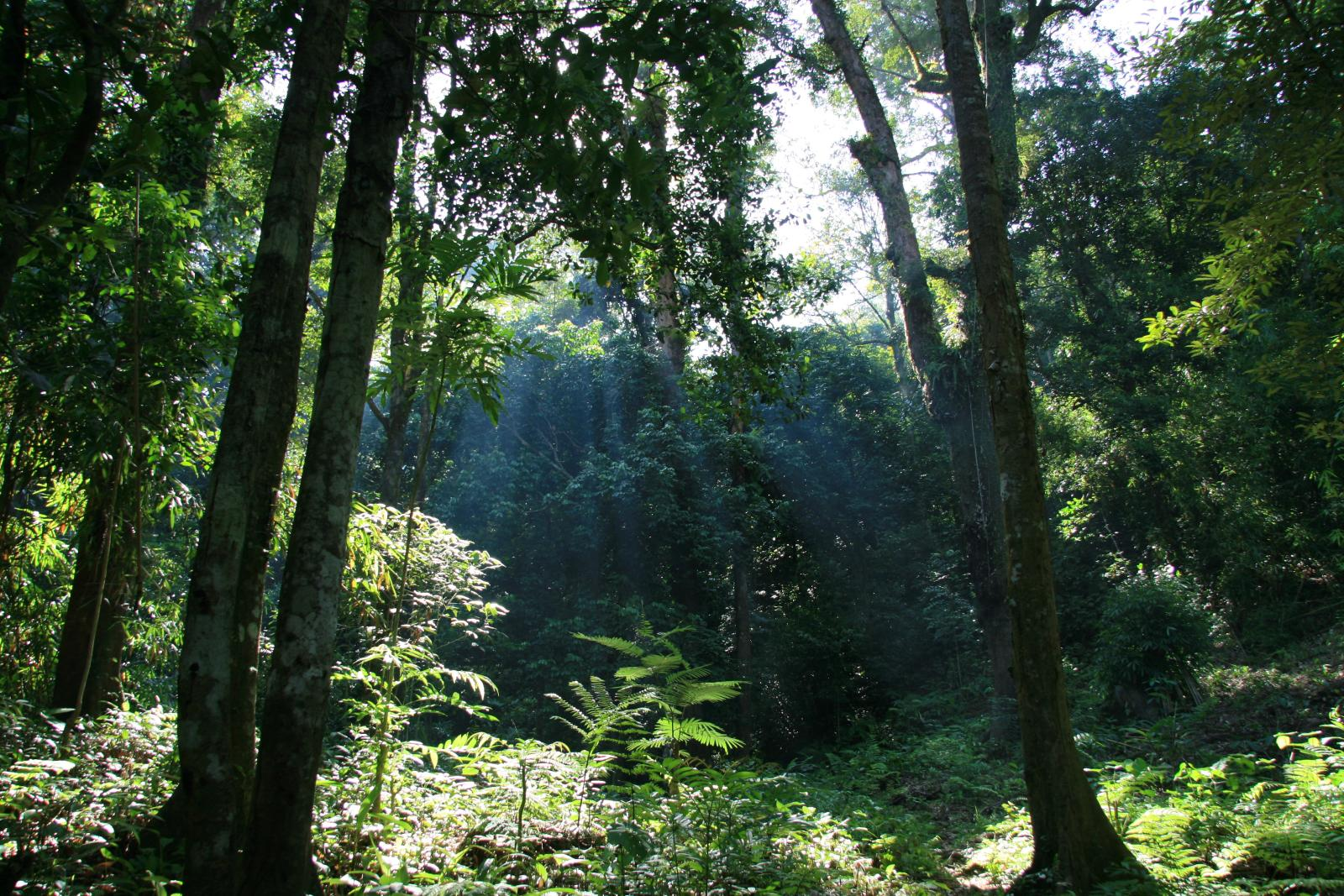
Rainforest at Mount Palung National Park, Borneo

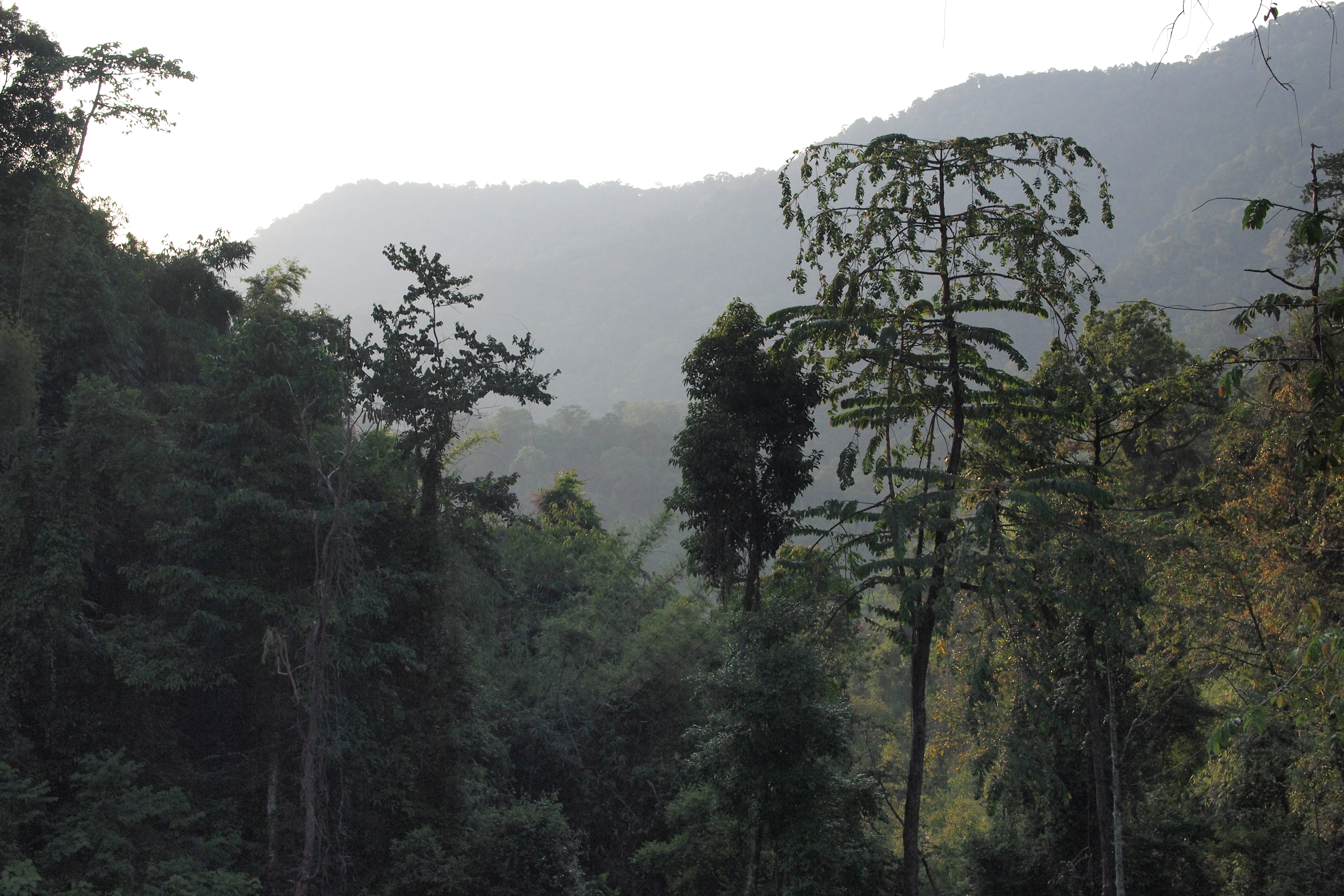
Canopy of Khao Sok tropical rainforest

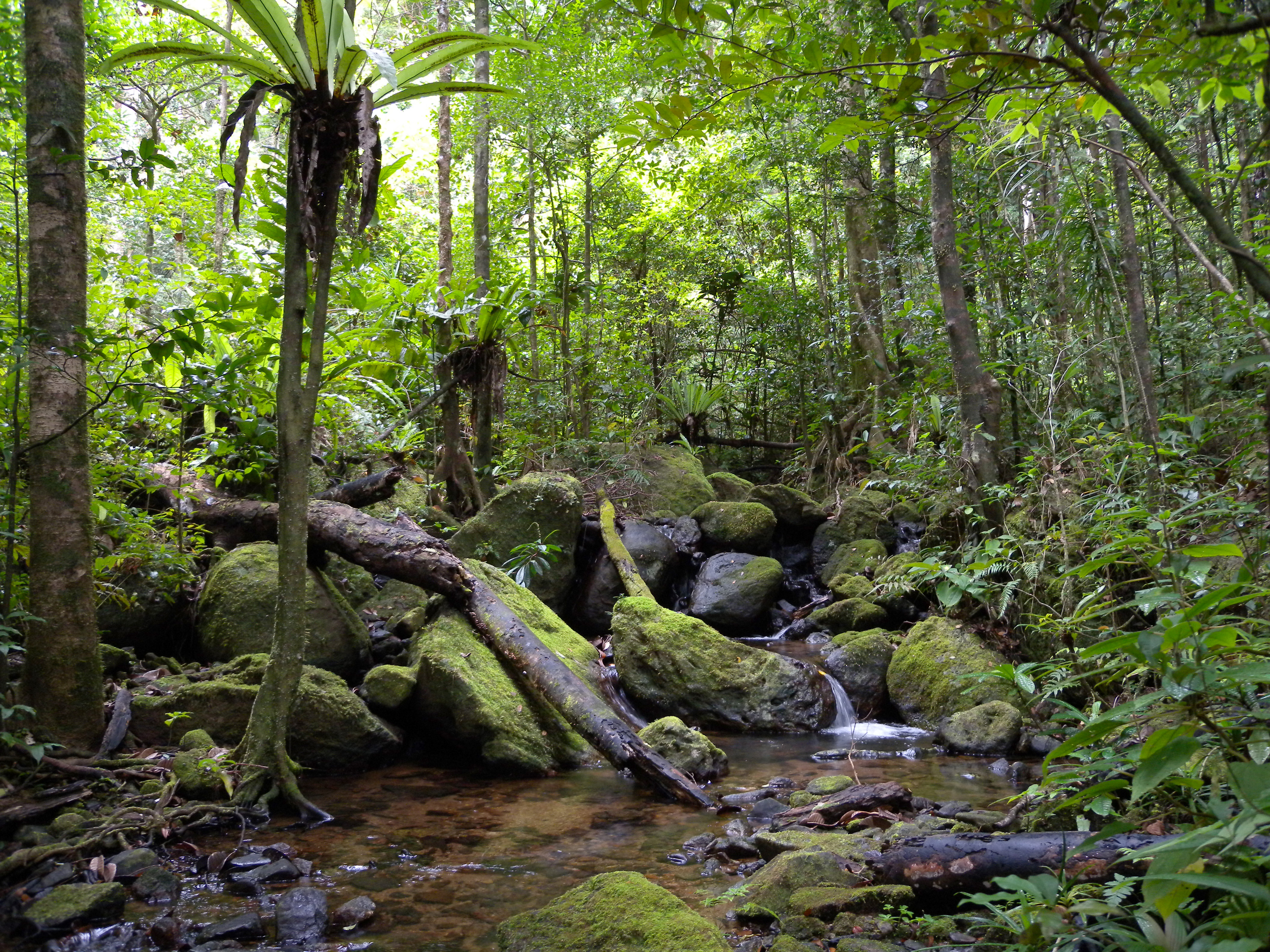
Stream in rainforests at Masoala National Park in Madagascar

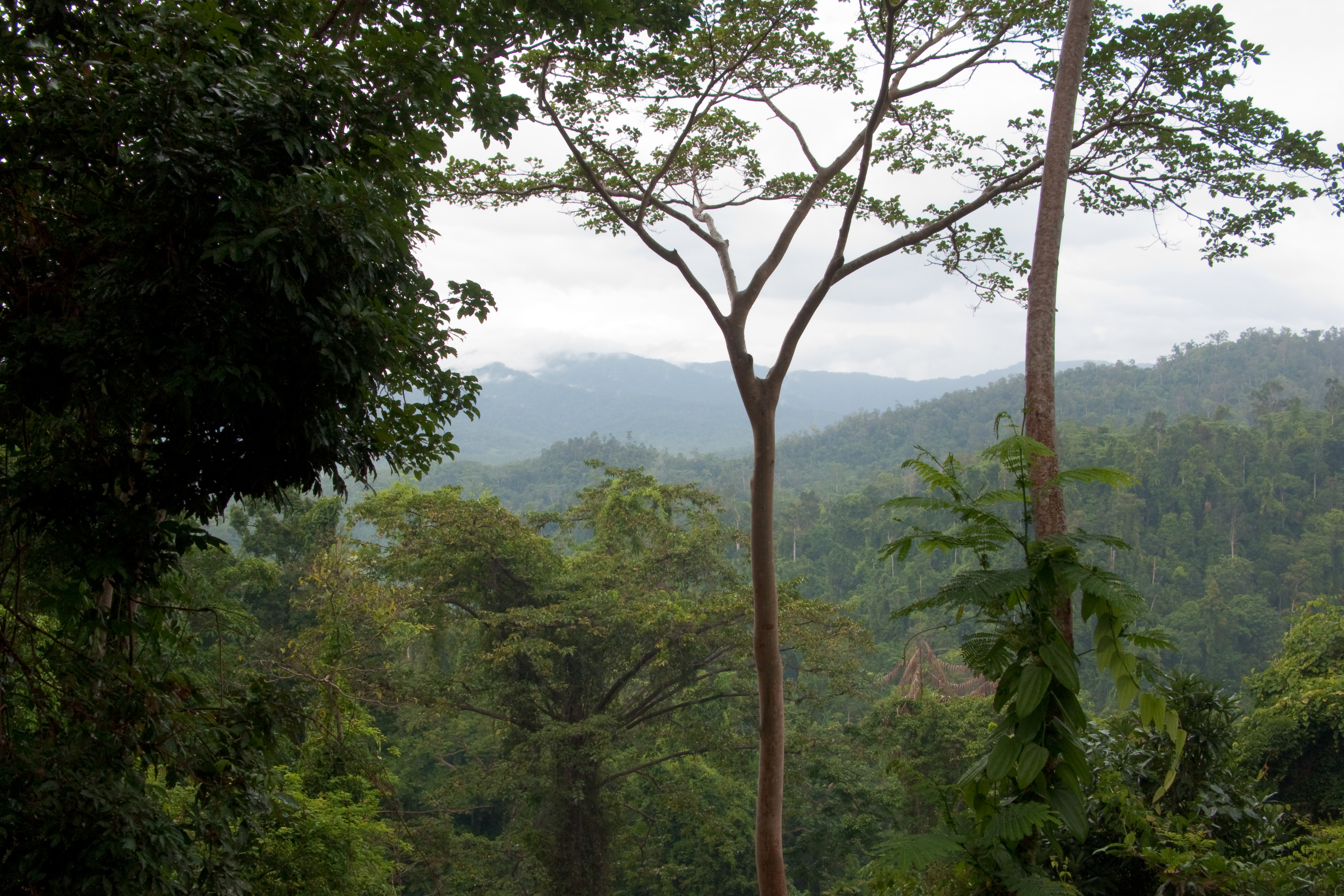
Old growth tropical rainforest in Palawan, Philippines

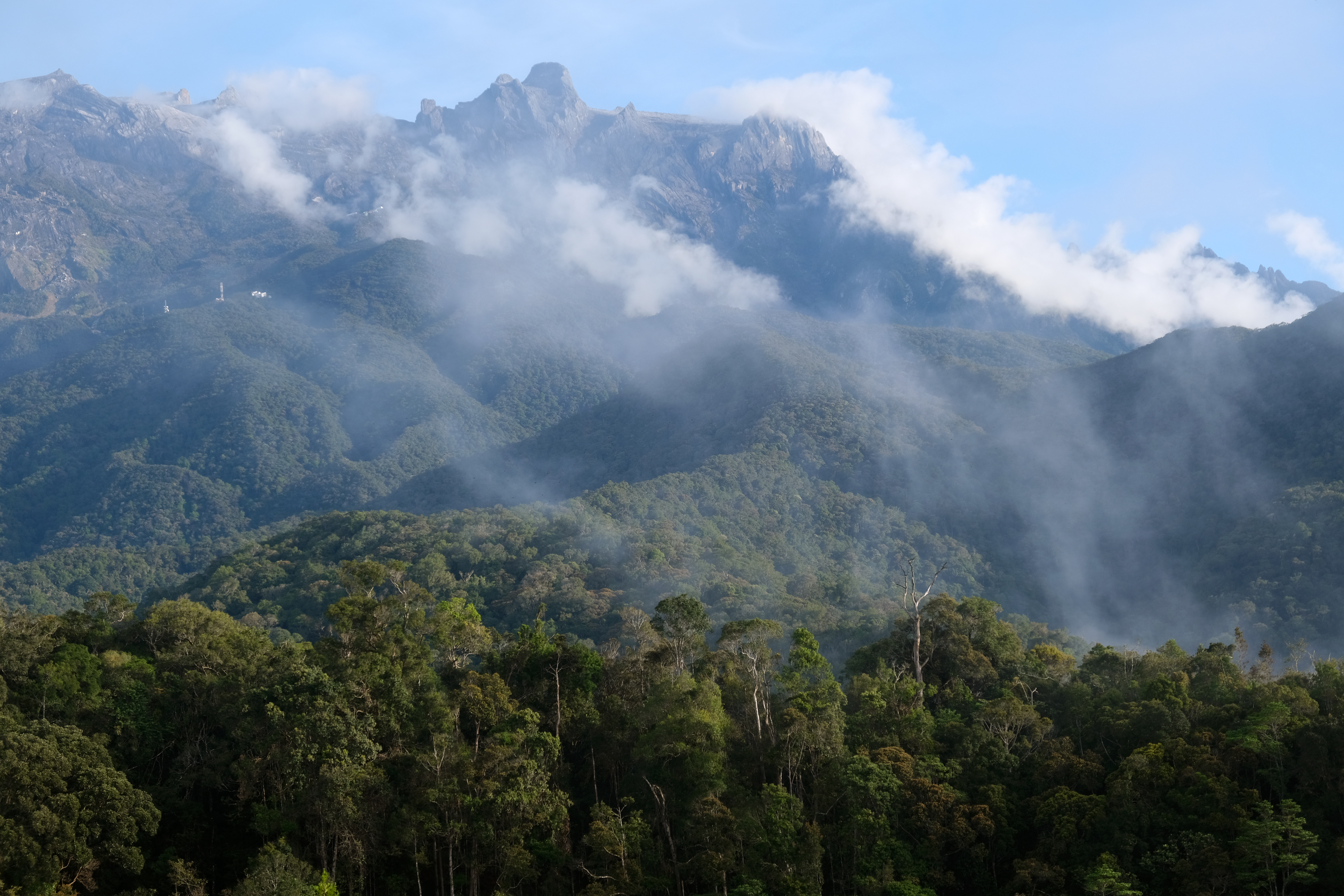
Rainforests in Kinabalu Park, Borneo

Rainforests are forests characterized by a closed and continuous tree canopy, moisture-dependent vegetation, the presence of epiphytes and lianas and the absence of wildfire. Rainforests can generally be classified as tropical rainforests or temperate rainforests, but other types have been described.

Estimates vary from 40% to 75% of all biotic species being indigenous to the rainforests. There may be many millions of species of plants, insects and microorganisms still undiscovered in tropical rainforests. Tropical rainforests have been called the "jewels of the Earth" and the "world's largest pharmacy", because over one quarter of natural medicines have been discovered there.

Rainforests as well as endemic rainforest species are rapidly disappearing due to deforestation, the resulting habitat loss and pollution of the atmosphere.

== Definition ==
Rainforests are characterized by a closed and continuous tree canopy, high humidity, the presence of moisture-dependent vegetation, a moist layer of leaf litter, the presence of epiphytes and lianas and the absence of wildfire. The largest areas of rainforest are tropical or temperate rainforests, but other vegetation associations including subtropical rainforest, littoral rainforest, cloud forest, vine thicket and even dry rainforest have been described.

=== Tropical rainforest ===
Worldwide tropical rainforest climate zones.

Tropical rainforests are characterized by a warm and wet climate usually with no substantial dry season: typically found within 10 degrees north and south of the equator. Mean monthly temperatures exceed 18 °C (64 °F) during all months of the year. Average annual rainfall is no less than 168 cm (66 in) and can exceed 1,000 cm (390 in) although it typically lies between 175 cm (69 in) and 200 cm (79 in).

Many of the world's tropical forests are associated with the location of the monsoon trough, also known as the Intertropical Convergence Zone. The broader category of tropical moist forests are located in the equatorial zone between the Tropic of Cancer and Tropic of Capricorn. Tropical rainforests exist in Southeast Asia (from Myanmar (Burma)) to the Philippines, Malaysia, Indonesia, Papua New Guinea and Sri Lanka; also in Sub-Saharan Africa from the Cameroon to the Democratic Republic of the Congo (Congo Rainforest), South America (e.g. the Amazon rainforest), Central America (e.g. Bosawás, the southern Yucatán Peninsula-El Peten-Belize-Calakmul), Australia, and on Pacific Islands (such as Hawaiʻi). Tropical forests have been called the "Earth's lungs", although it is now known that rainforests contribute little net oxygen addition to the atmosphere through photosynthesis.

=== Temperate rainforest ===
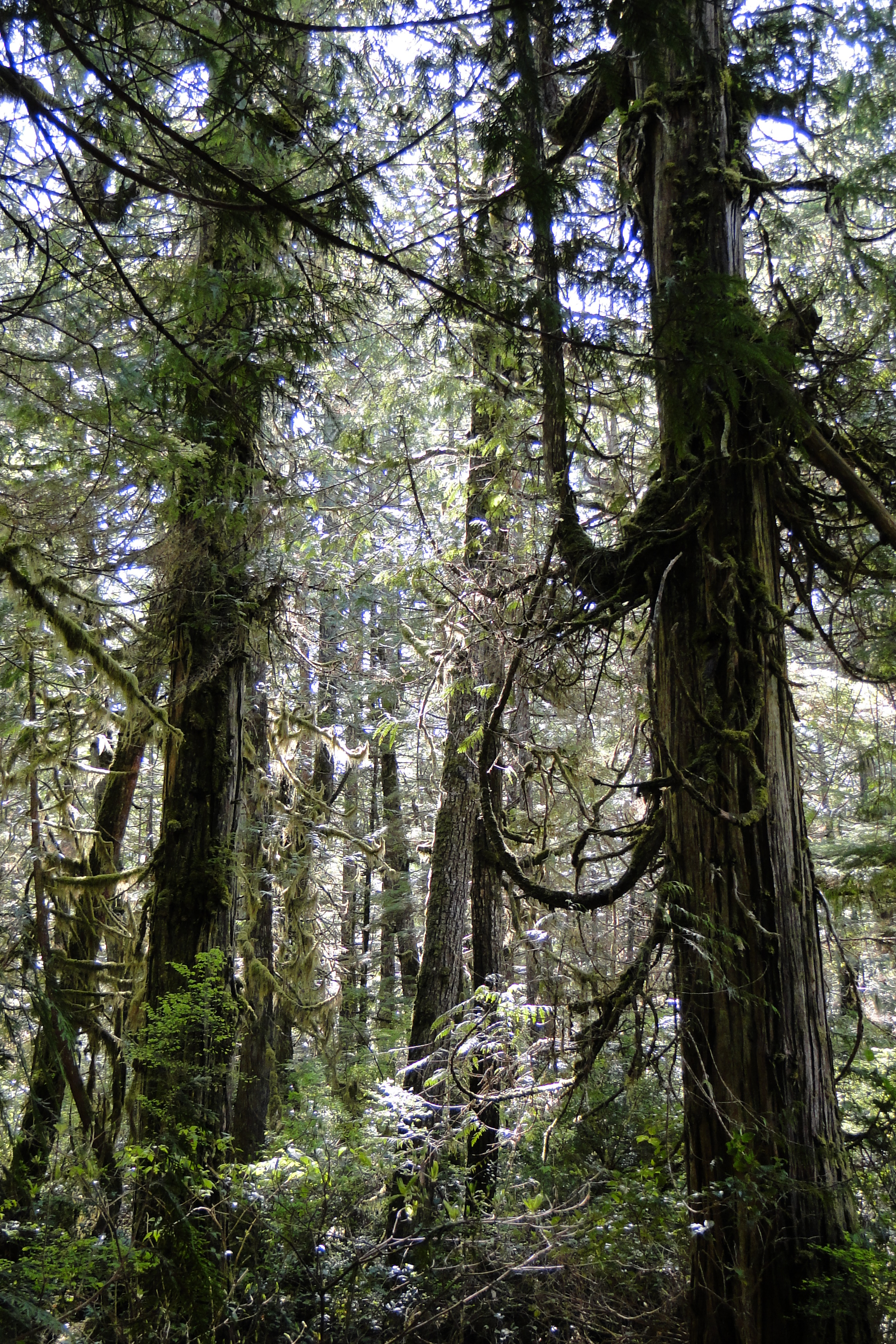
Temperate rainforest in Pacific Rim National Park Reserve in Canada

Tropical forests cover a large part of the globe, but temperate rainforests only occur in a few regions around the world. Temperate rainforests are rainforests in temperate regions. They occur in North America (in the Pacific Northwest in Alaska, British Columbia, Washington, Oregon as well as California and the Appalachian Mountains), in Europe (parts of the British Isles such as the coastal areas of Ireland and Scotland, southern Norway, parts of the western Balkans along the Adriatic coast, as well as in Galicia and coastal areas of the eastern Black Sea, including Georgia and coastal Turkey), in East Asia (in southern China, highlands of Taiwan, much of Japan and Korea, and on Sakhalin Island and the adjacent Russian Far East coast), in South America (southern Chile) and also in southeastern Australia and New Zealand.

=== Dry rainforest ===
Dry rainforests have a more open canopy layer than other rainforests, and are found in areas of lower rainfall (630–1,100 mm (25–43 in). Dry rainforests typically occur in the rain-shadow of mountainous areas. In Australia, dry rainforests have structurally complex species composition. These species can have various adaptations such as deciduousness or semi-deciduousness, reduced leaf size, thick leathery leaves (sclerophylly), sharp thorns or leaf margins and prickles. Dry rainforests containing a dense vine understory can be split up into different sub-types which include low microphyll vine forest, Araucarian vine forest, Semi-evergreen vine thicket, and deciduous vine thicket. These can further split up into either microphyll or notophyll depending on their leaf sizes.

== Layers ==
A tropical rainforest typically has a number of layers, each with different plants and animals adapted for life in that particular area. Examples include the emergent, canopy, understory and forest floor layers.

=== Emergent layer ===
The emergent layer contains a small number of very large trees called emergents, which grow above the general canopy, reaching heights of 45–55 m, although on occasion a few species will grow to 70–80 m tall. They need to be able to withstand the hot temperatures and strong winds that occur above the canopy in some areas. Eagles, butterflies, bats and certain monkeys inhabit this layer.

=== Canopy layer ===
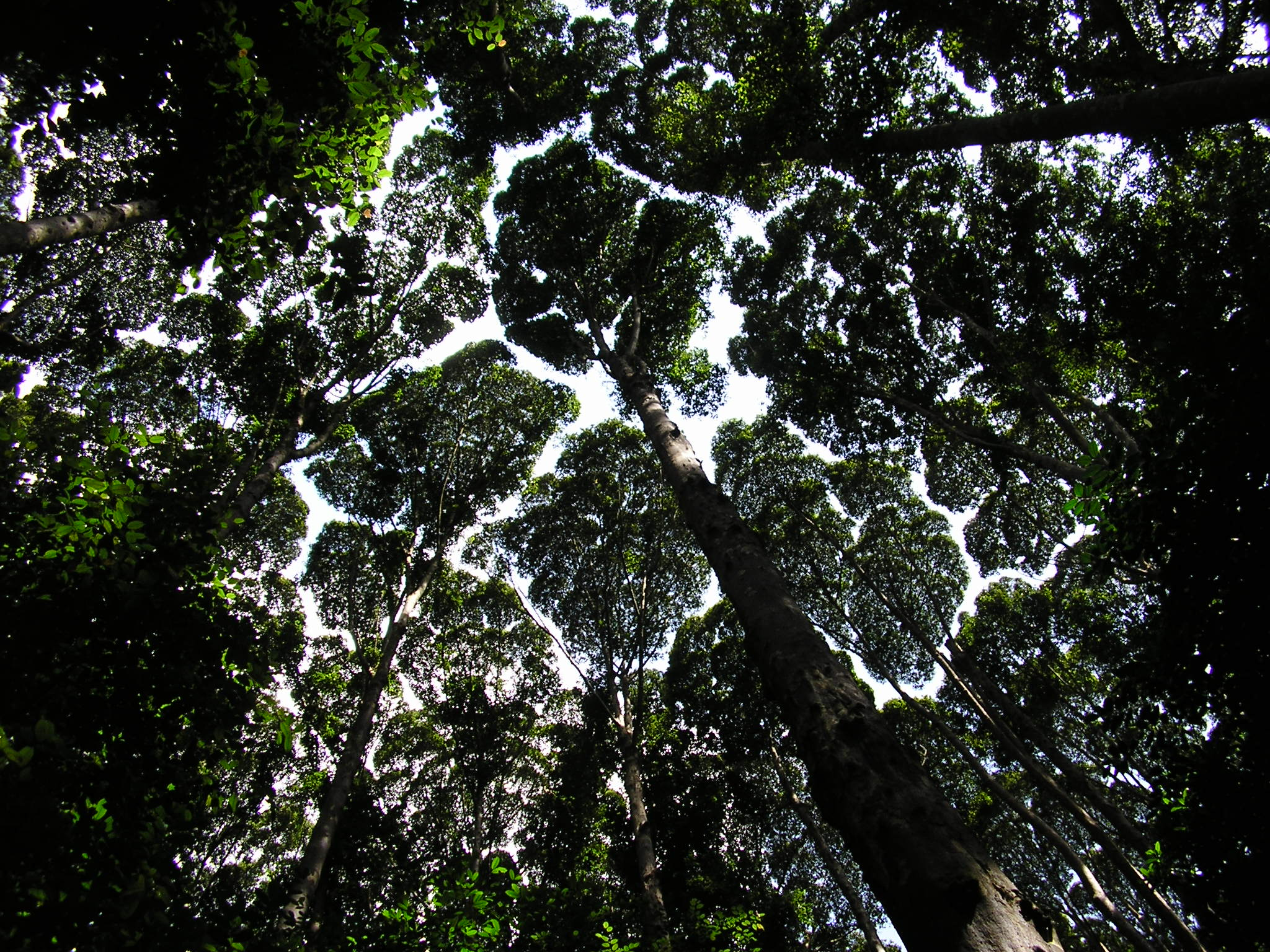
The canopy at the Forest Research Institute Malaysia showing crown shyness

The canopy layer contains the majority of the largest trees, typically 30 metres (98 ft) to 45 metres (148 ft) tall. The densest areas of biodiversity are found in the forest canopy, a more or less continuous cover of foliage formed by adjacent treetops. The canopy, by some estimates, is home to 50 percent of all plant species. Epiphytic plants attach to trunks and branches, and obtain water and minerals from rain and debris that collects on the supporting plants. The fauna is similar to that found in the emergent layer but more diverse. A quarter of all insect species are believed to exist in the rainforest canopy. Scientists have long suspected the richness of the canopy as a habitat, but have only recently developed practical methods of exploring it. As long ago as 1917, naturalist William Beebe declared that "another continent of life remains to be discovered, not upon the Earth, but one to two hundred feet above it, extending over thousands of square miles." A true exploration of this habitat only began in the 1980s, when scientists developed methods to reach the canopy, such as firing ropes into the trees using crossbows. Exploration of the canopy is still in its infancy, but other methods include the use of balloons and airships to float above the highest branches and the building of cranes and walkways planted on the forest floor. The science of accessing tropical forest canopy using airships or similar aerial platforms is called dendronautics.

=== Understory layer ===
The understory or understorey layer lies between the canopy and the forest floor. It is home to a number of birds, snakes and lizards, as well as predators such as jaguars, boa constrictors and leopards. The leaves are much larger at this level and insect life is abundant. Many seedlings that will grow to the canopy level are present in the understory. Only about 5% of the sunlight shining on the rainforest canopy reaches the understory. This layer can be called a shrub layer, although the shrub layer may also be considered a separate layer.

=== Forest floor ===
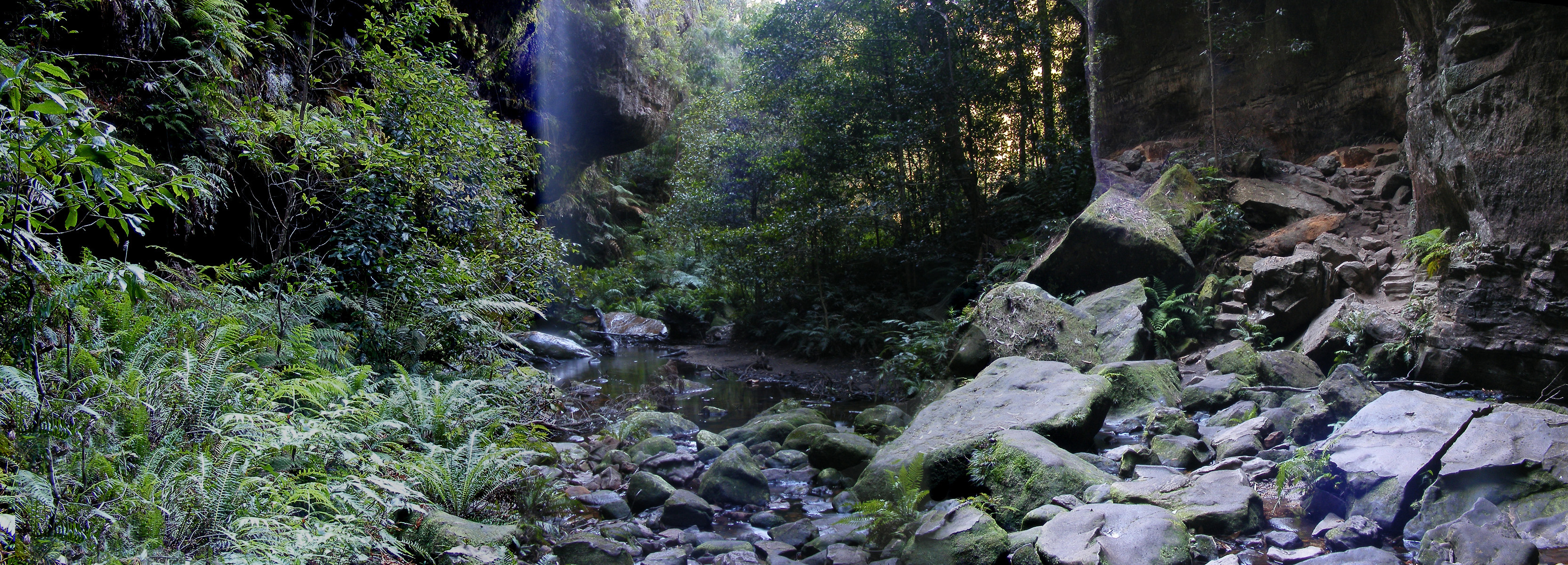
Rainforest in the Blue Mountains, Australia

The forest floor, the bottom-most layer, receives only 2% of the sunlight. Only plants adapted to low light can grow in this region. Away from riverbanks, swamps and clearings, where dense undergrowth is found, the forest floor is relatively clear of vegetation because of the low sunlight penetration. It also contains decaying plant and animal matter, which disappears quickly, because the warm, humid conditions promote rapid decay. Many forms of fungi growing here help decay the animal and plant waste.

== Flora and fauna ==
It is unknown how many species are found in the world's tropical rainforests, however a very large proportion of vascular plants are native to them. Rainforests support a very broad array of fauna, including mammals, reptiles, amphibians, birds and invertebrates. Mammals may include primates, felids and other families. Reptiles include snakes, turtles, chameleons and other families; while birds include such families as Vangidae and Cuculidae. Dozens of families of invertebrates are found in rainforests. Fungi are also very common in rainforest areas as they can feed on the decomposing remains of plants and animals.

The great diversity in rainforest species is in large part the result of diverse and numerous physical refuges, i.e. places in which plants are inaccessible to many herbivores, or in which animals can hide from predators. Having numerous refuges available also results in much higher total biomass than would otherwise be possible.

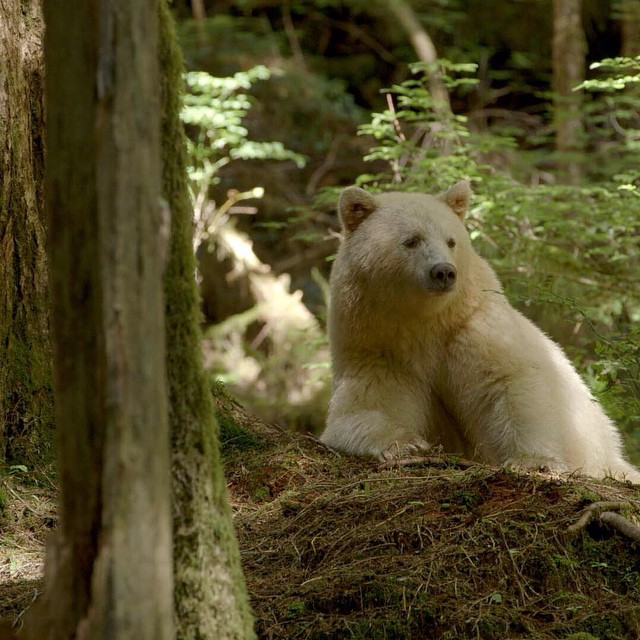
A Kermode bear from the Great Bear Rainforest, Canada

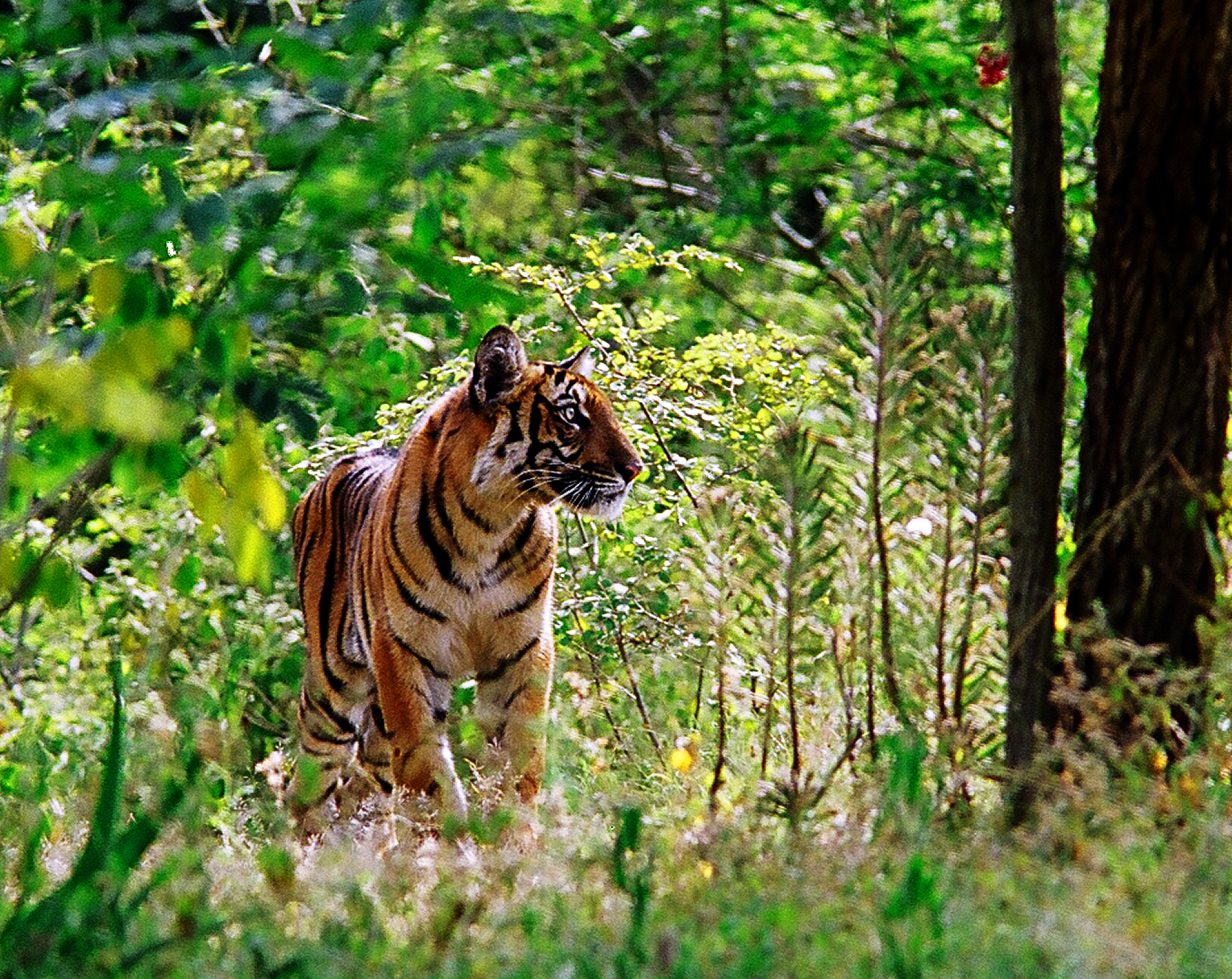
A Bengal tiger in Mudumalai National Park, India

A jaguar in the Amazon rainforest, South America

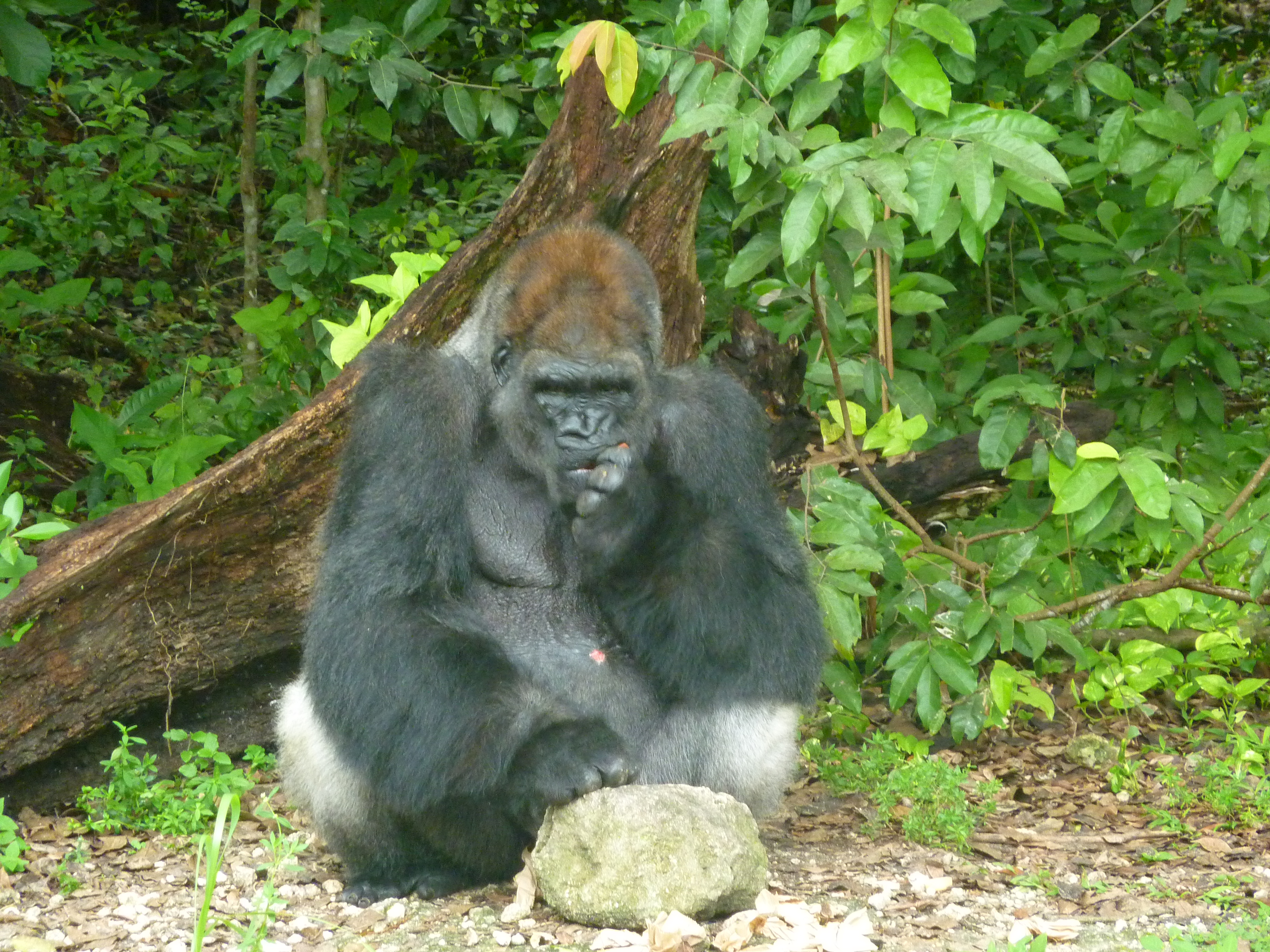
Western lowland gorilla in the African rainforest

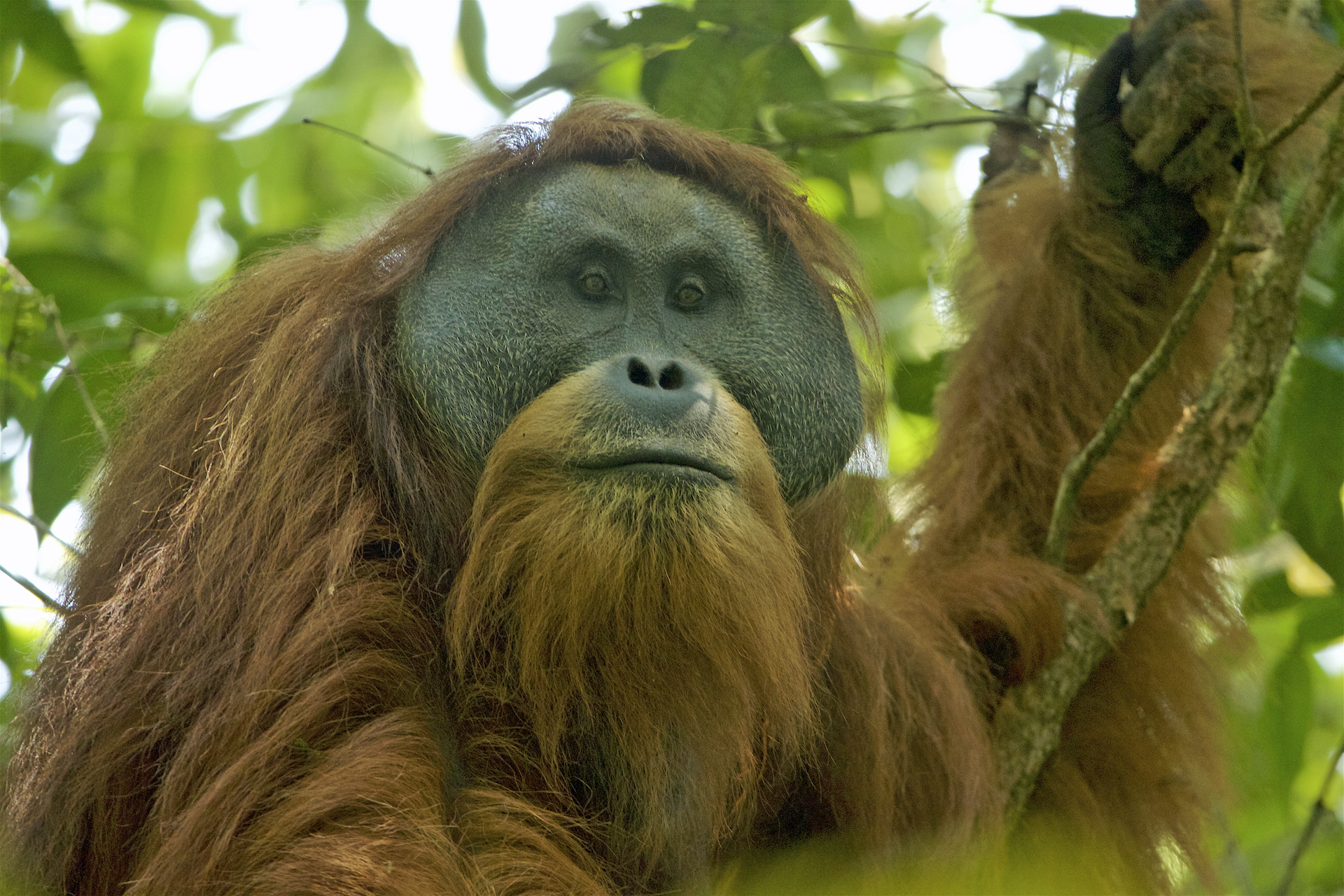
Orangutans in Tanjung Puting, Indonesia

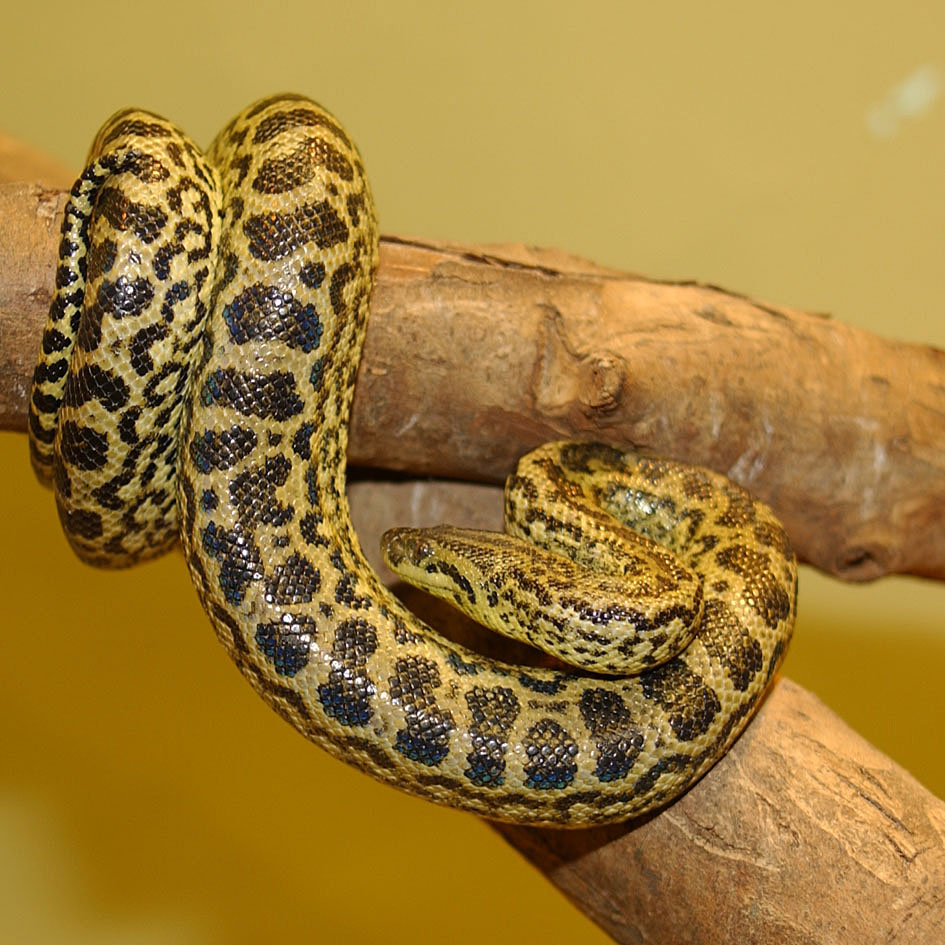
Yellow anacondas reside in the Amazon basin

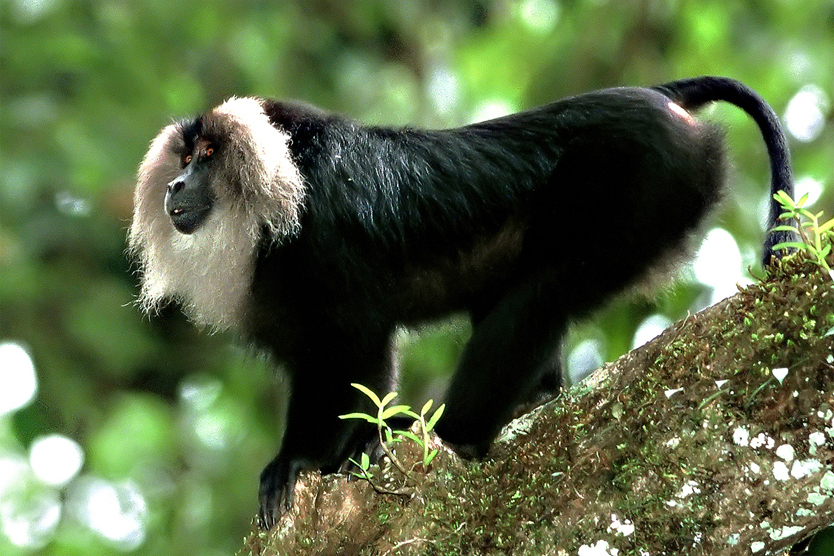
Lion-tailed macaque in Silent Valley National Park, India

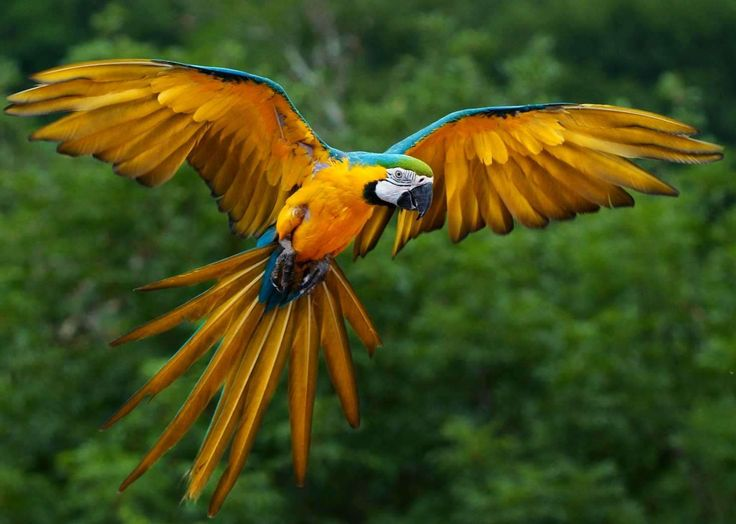
A macaw in the Amazon rainforest

Some species of fauna show a trend towards declining populations in rainforests, for example, reptiles that feed on amphibians and reptiles. This trend requires close monitoring. The seasonality of rainforests affects the reproductive patterns of amphibians, and this in turn can directly affect the species of reptiles that feed on these groups, particularly species with specialized feeding, since these are less likely to use alternative resources.

== Soils ==
Despite the growth of vegetation in a tropical rainforest, soil quality is often quite poor. Rapid bacterial decay prevents the accumulation of humus. The concentration of iron and aluminium oxides by the laterization process gives the oxisols a bright red colour and sometimes produces mineral deposits such as bauxite. Most trees have roots near the surface because there are insufficient nutrients below the surface; most of the trees' minerals come from the top layer of decomposing leaves and animals. On younger substrates, especially of volcanic origin, tropical soils may be quite fertile. If rainforest trees are cleared, rain can accumulate on the exposed soil surfaces, creating run-off, and beginning a process of soil erosion. Eventually, streams and rivers form and flooding becomes possible. There are several reasons for the poor soil quality. First is that the soil is highly acidic. The roots of plants rely on an acidity difference between the roots and the soil in order to absorb nutrients. When the soil is acidic, there is little difference, and therefore little absorption of nutrients from the soil. Second, the type of clay particles present in tropical rainforest soil has a poor ability to trap nutrients and stop them from washing away. Even if humans artificially add nutrients to the soil, the nutrients mostly wash away and are not absorbed by the plants. Finally, these soils are poor due to the high volume of rain in tropical rainforests washing nutrients out of the soil more quickly than in other climates.

== Effect on global climate ==
A natural rainforest emits and absorbs vast quantities of carbon dioxide. On a global scale, long-term fluxes are approximately in balance, so that an undisturbed rainforest would have a small net impact on atmospheric carbon dioxide levels, though they may have other climatic effects (on cloud formation, for example, by recycling water vapour). No rainforest today can be considered to be undisturbed. Human-induced deforestation plays a significant role in causing rainforests to release carbon dioxide, as do other factors, whether human-induced or natural, which result in tree death, such as burning and drought. Some climate models operating with interactive vegetation predict a large loss of Amazonian rainforest around 2050 due to drought, forest dieback and the subsequent release of more carbon dioxide.

== Human uses ==
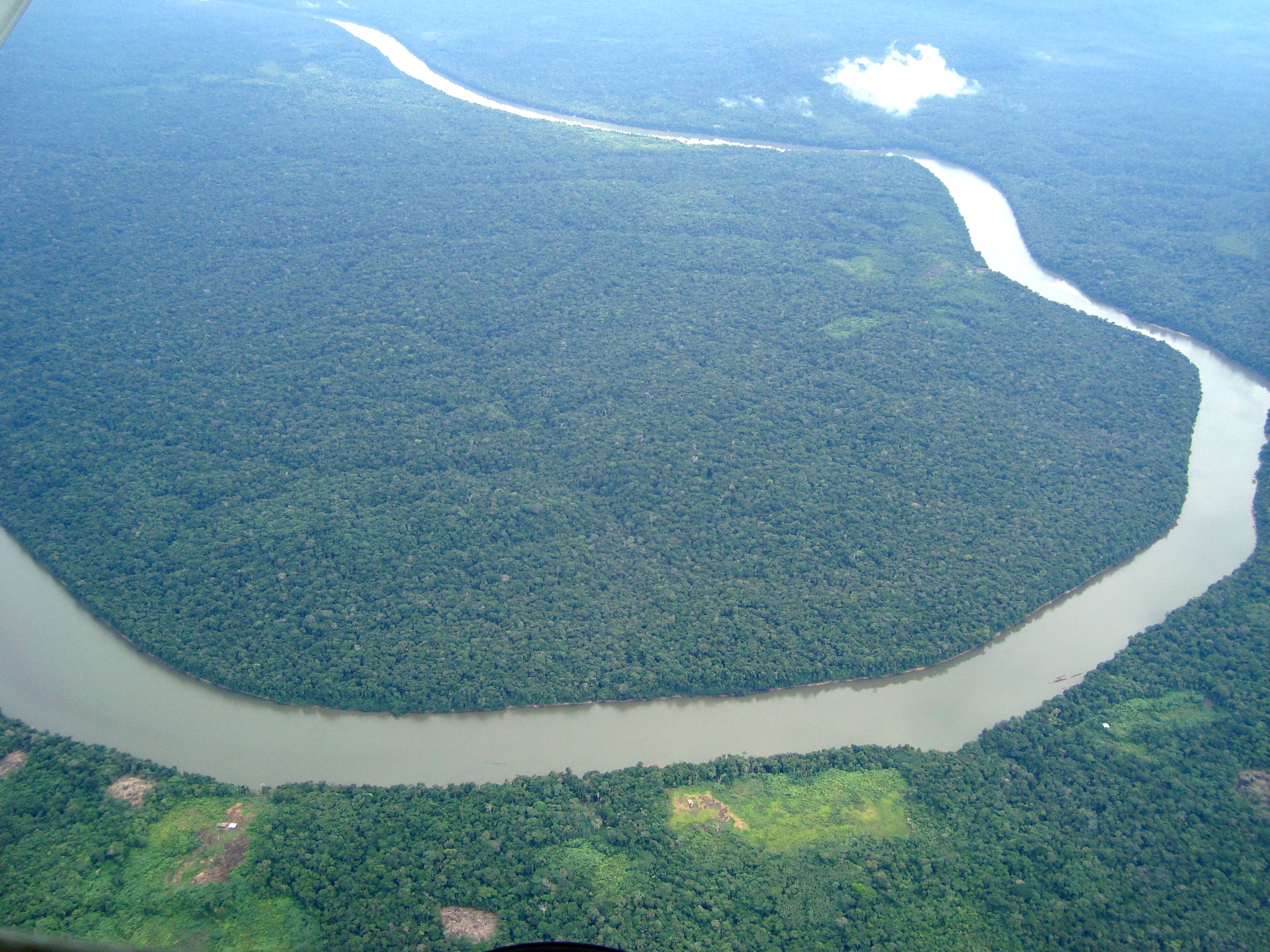
Aerial view of the Amazon rainforest, taken from a plane.

Tropical rainforests provide timber as well as animal products such as meat and hides. Rainforests also have value as tourism destinations and for the ecosystem services provided. Many foods originally came from tropical forests, and are still mostly grown on plantations in regions that were formerly primary forest. Also, plant-derived medicines are commonly used for fever, fungal infections, burns, gastrointestinal problems, pain, respiratory problems, and wound treatment. At the same time, rainforests are usually not used sustainably by non-native peoples but are being exploited or removed for agricultural purposes.

=== Native people ===
On 18 January 2007, FUNAI reported also that it had confirmed the presence of 67 different uncontacted tribes in Brazil, up from 40 in 2005. With this addition, Brazil has now overtaken the island of New Guinea as the country having the largest number of uncontacted tribes. Indonesia's Papua region in the island of New Guinea is home to an estimated 44 uncontacted tribal groups. The tribes are in danger because of the deforestation, especially in Brazil.

Central African rainforest is home of the Mbuti pygmies, one of the hunter-gatherer peoples living in equatorial rainforests characterised by their short height (below one and a half metres, or 59 inches, on average). They were the subject of a study by Colin Turnbull, The Forest People, in 1962. Pygmies who live in Southeast Asia are, amongst others, referred to as "Negrito". There are many tribes in the rainforests of the Malaysian state of Sarawak. Sarawak is part of Borneo, the third largest island in the world. Some of the other tribes in Sarawak are: the Kayan, Kenyah, Kejaman, Kelabit, Punan Bah, Tanjong, Sekapan, and the Lahanan. Collectively, they are referred to as Dayaks or Orangulu which means "people of the interior".

About half of Sarawak's 1.5 million people are Dayaks. Most Dayaks, it is believed by anthropologists, came originally from the South-East Asian mainland. Their mythologies support this.

== Deforestation ==
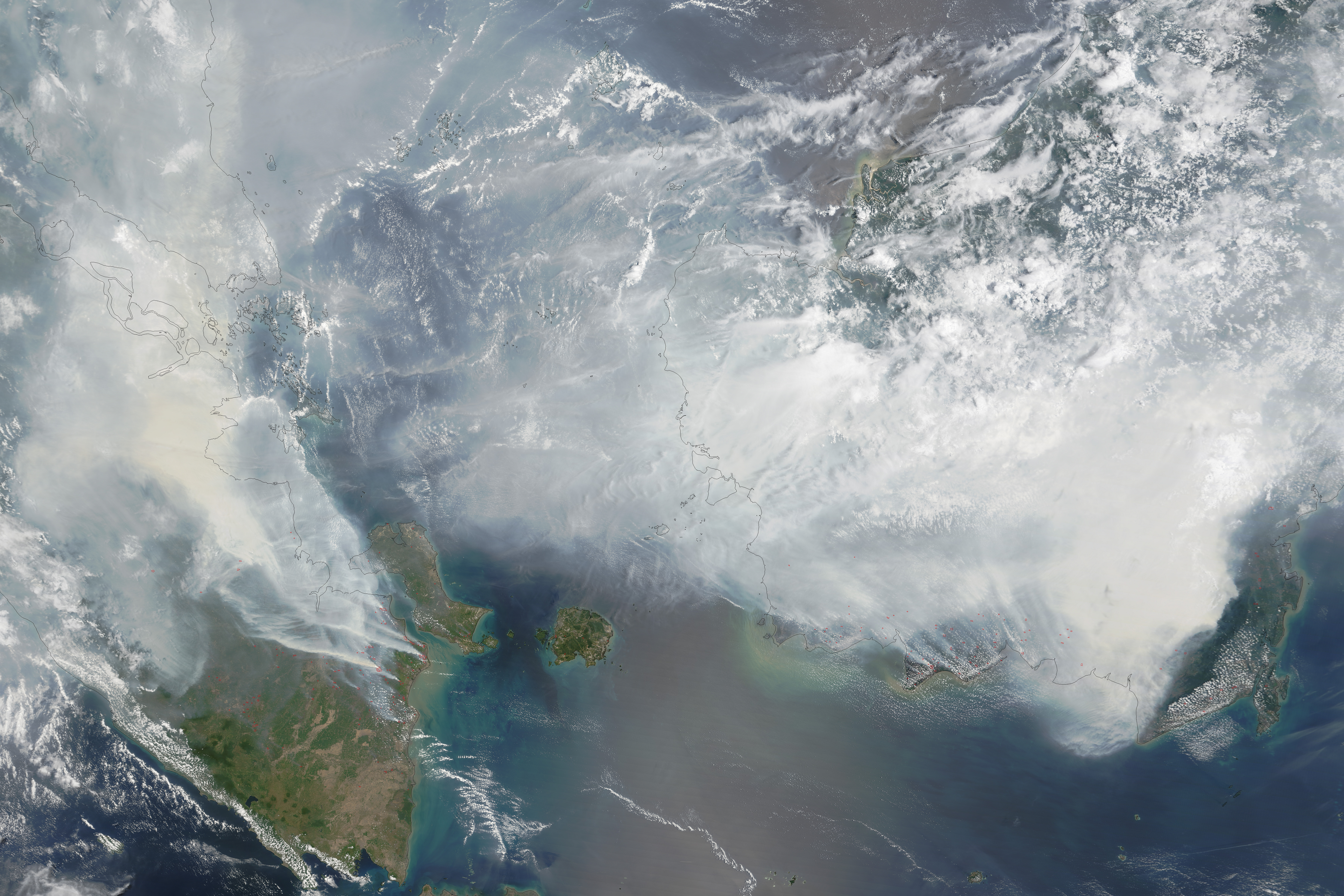
Satellite photograph of the haze above Borneo and Sumatra, 24 September 2015

Tropical and temperate rainforests have been subjected to heavy legal and illegal logging for their valuable hardwoods and agricultural clearance (slash-and-burn, clearcutting) throughout the 20th century and the area covered by rainforests around the world is shrinking. Biologists have estimated that large numbers of species are being driven to extinction (possibly more than 50,000 a year; at that rate, says E. O. Wilson of Harvard University, a quarter or more of all species on Earth could be exterminated within 50 years) due to the removal of habitat with destruction of the rainforests.

Another factor causing the loss of rainforest is expanding urban areas. Littoral rainforest growing along coastal areas of eastern Australia is now rare due to ribbon development to accommodate the demand for seachange lifestyles.

Forests are being destroyed at a rapid pace. Almost 90% of West Africa's rainforest has been destroyed. Since the arrival of humans, Madagascar has lost two thirds of its original rainforest. At present rates, tropical rainforests in Indonesia would be logged out in 10 years and Papua New Guinea in 13 to 16 years. According to Rainforest Rescue, an important reason for the increasing deforestation rate, especially in Indonesia, is the expansion of oil palm plantations to meet growing demand for cheap vegetable fats and biofuels. In Indonesia, palm oil is already cultivated on nine million hectares and, together with Malaysia, the island nation produces about 85 percent of the world's palm oil.

Several countries, notably Brazil, have declared their deforestation a national emergency. Amazon deforestation jumped by 69% in 2008 compared to 2007's twelve months, according to official government data.

However, a 30 January 2009 New York Times article stated, "By one estimate, for every acre of rainforest cut down each year, more than 50 acres of new forest are growing in the tropics." The new forest includes secondary forest on former farmland and so-called degraded forest.

== See also ==
- Cloud forest
- Ecology
- Inland rainforest
- Intact forest landscape
- Jungle
- Stratification (vegetation)
