= Canopy research =

Canopy research is the field of scientific research based upon data collected in the canopy of trees.

== Objects ==
- Description of plant and animal species residing in the tree-summits. Mainly ancient forests and tropical forests are studied.
- Study of forest ecosystem dynamics, change drivers and other factors that shape forest systems.
- Collection of meteorological data. Meteorological studies can help researchers measure the efficacy of forest canopies in offsetting global climate change. Researchers at the Agricultural Research Service have calibrated a model for forest canopies that measures and estimates the amount of carbon a forest canopy absorbs/releases due to photosynthesis/respiration. The research found that the forest canopy shifted from a carbon “sink” (of net carbon absorption due to photosynthesis) to a carbon “source” (of net carbon respiration) following the defoliation of the canopy due to the gypsy moth. This research helps scientists determine the role of trees in offsetting carbon released into the atmosphere, which contributes to global warming, and the biological influences that impact it.

== Chief discoveries ==
- 90% of animal and 50% of plant species in tropical rainforests live in the upper levels of the large trees. As many as 1000 different insects have been collected from one tree.
- Tropical forests require a minimum area to develop their crucial micro climate and to provide habitats for larger mammals.
- While grown forests continue to store carbon dioxide, young forests store up ten times more.

Canopy research is a relatively new scientific field which was hampered for a long time by lack of means of access to the tree canopies and lack of appropriate means of housing researchers.

Climbing gear, tree houses, canopy walkways, cranes, airships and inflatable platforms resting on the treetops have lately overcome these barriers.

- Cranes have proven to offer the best three-dimensional access. The effort to set them up is worthwhile, as most research projects are long term.
- Airships (or dirigibles, or blimps) offer the best means of accessing large areas of canopy.
- Tree houses are best for housing because they offer dry, light and secure accommodation without cutting down an area of forest.

== See also ==
- Canopy (biology)
- Leaf Area Index
- Nalini Nadkarni, American ecologist who pioneered the study of Costa Rican rain forest canopies.
- Stephen C. Sillett, Kenneth L. Fisher Chair in Redwood Forest Ecology, Humboldt State University.
- The White Diamond, a Werner Herzog documentary about building an airship for canopy research.
- Margaret D. Lowman, American ecologist who pioneered usage of canopy walkways
