= Gregory Forth =

Canadian anthropologist

Gregory Forth FRSC
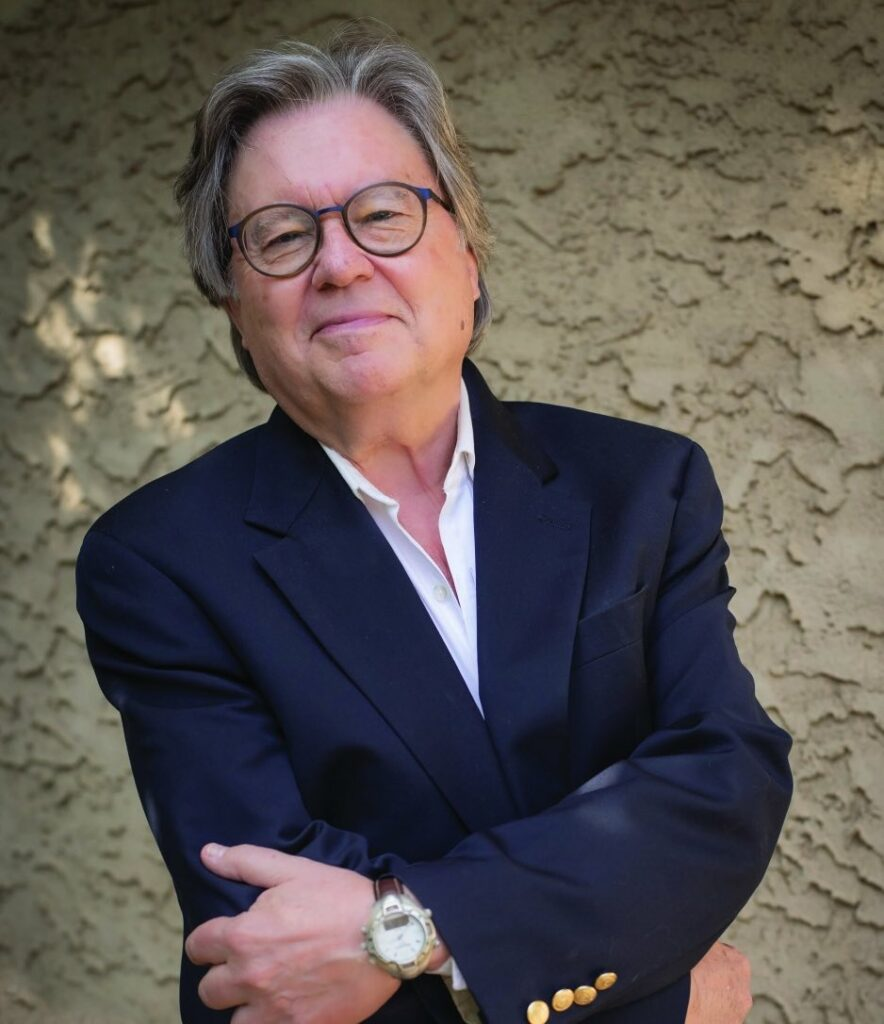
- Gregory Forth
- Citizenship: Canadian and British
- Awards: Fellow of the Royal Society of Canada (2012)

Academic background
- Education: Simon Fraser University (BA Hons, 1971); University of Oxford (MLitt, 1974; DPhil, 1980)
- Thesis: Rindi: an ethnographic study of a traditional domain in Eastern Sumba (1980)

Academic work
- Discipline: Anthropology
- Sub-discipline: Social-Cultural anthropology; Ethnobiology; Anthropology of Religion
- Institutions: University of Alberta (1986–present); British Institute in Southeast Asia (1983-1985); University of Oxford (1974-1977); Simon Fraser University (1971, 1972; 1982)
- Main interests: Symbolic and cognitive anthropology; Human-animal relations; Anthropology of Religion; Kinship, marriage and sexuality; Myth and oral narrative; Southeast Asia

Gregory Forth is a Canadian anthropologist and Fellow of the Royal Society of Canada. He is professor emeritus of anthropology at the University of Alberta, where he taught from 1986 to 2019. Forth received his DPhil from the University of Oxford in 1980. Forth's work focuses on the peoples of eastern Indonesia (especially the Nagé and Kéo of Flores Island) and spans religion, kinship and marriage, ethnozoology, mythology and metaphor, and human-animal relations. His books include Nagé Birds (2004) and Between Ape and Human (2022), the latter presenting his hypothesis that Homo floresiensis may survive on Flores based on indigenous accounts he collected prior to the 2003 fossil discovery.

== Education ==
Forth earned his BA in anthropology from Simon Fraser University in 1971. He received his MLitt from the University of Oxford in 1974, followed by his DPhil from Oxford in 1980. His doctoral thesis, titled "Rindi: an ethnographic study of a traditional domain in eastern Sumba", was based on two years of fieldwork among the Rindi people of eastern Sumba and was later published as a book by Martinus Nijhoff in 1981.

== Career ==
Before joining the University of Alberta, Forth held positions at Simon Fraser University (1971, 1972; 1982) and the British Institute in Southeast Asia (1983-1985). He joined the University of Alberta in 1986 and was promoted to full professor in 1995.

As a social/cultural anthropologist, Forth's position has combined structuralism, interpretivism, and cognitivist approaches. He is known for his work in ethnobiology (particularly ethnozoology) as well studies of religion, ritual, myth, symbolism, human-animal relations, myth and oral tradition, and the anthropology of time. Forth has conducted fieldwork in eastern Indonesia, and has worked on Sumba and with the Nagé, Keo, and Lio peoples of Flores Island (1984-2018).

In November 2020, his book A Dog Pissing at the Edge of a Path: Animal Metaphors in Eastern Indonesian Society won the Bookseller/Diagram Prize for Oddest Title of the Year.

In his 2022 book Between Ape and Human: An Anthropologist on the Trail of a Hidden Hominoid, Forth argues that the diminutive hominin Homo floresiensis could still survive in Indonesia. His hypothesis is based on eyewitness accounts he collected from Flores islanders, particularly from the Lio region in the east-central part of Flores, describing small-bodied, hairy hominoids locally called "lio ho'a" (ape-man). Significantly, Forth began collecting these accounts in the 1980s and 1990s, well before the 2003 discovery of Homo floresiensis fossils, ruling out the possibility that local reports were influenced by news of the archaeological find. The creatures described by islanders correspond closely to paleontological reconstructions of Homo floresiensis, including their small stature (approximately one meter tall), small head size, and body hair. Forth notes that sightings are typically reported from high mountainous forest regions that remain sparsely populated and infrequently visited by humans.

== Awards and fellowships ==
Forth has held visiting fellowships and professorships at the Australian National University (1991, 1993, 2011), Ecoles des Hautes Etudes en Sciences Sociales, Paris (2001), the University of Kent (2005), the International Institute for Asian Studies in Leiden (2005-2006), and Kyoto University (2015). He held a McCalla Professorship at the University of Alberta in 2004-2005 and received the Research Excellence Award for a full professor in the Faculty of Arts for 2008-2009. He was elected a Fellow of the Royal Society of Canada in 2012.

== Selected publications ==
=== Books ===
- Rindi: an ethnographic study of a traditional domain in eastern Sumba. Martinus Nijhoff, The Hague. January 1, 1981. ISBN 978-90-24-76169-2.
- Space and Place in Eastern Indonesia. University of Kent at Canterbury, Centre of South-East Asian Studies. 1991.
- Beneath the volcano. KITLV Press. 1998. ISBN 978-90-6718-120-4.
- Dualism and hierarchy. Oxford University Press. 2001. ISBN 978-0-19-823424-1.
- Nagé birds. Routledge. 2004. ISBN 978-0-415-31827-3.
- Forth, Gregory; Vermeulen, Han F. (2004). Guardians of the Land in Kelimado. KITLV Press. ISBN 9789067182232.
- Images of the Wildman in Southeast Asia: An Anthropological Perspective. Routledge. December 10, 2008. ISBN 978-0710313546.
- Why the Porcupine is Not a Bird: Explorations in the Folk Zoology of an Eastern Indonesian People. University of Toronto Press. 2016. ISBN 978-1442650282.
- A Dog Pissing at the Edge of a Path: Animal Metaphors in an Eastern Indonesian Society. McGill-Queen's University Press. 2019. ISBN 978-0773557642.
- Between Ape and Human: An Anthropologist on the Trail of a Hidden Hominoid. Pegasus Books. 2022. ISBN 978-1639361434.
- Ritual and Ontogeny: Life Cycles Rites in an Eastern Indonesian Society. Carolina Academic Press. 2024. ISBN 978-1531027292.

=== Articles and book chapters ===
- Forth, Gregory. "Blood, milk and coconuts: A study of intracultural ritual variation." Man (Journal of the Royal Anthropological Institute) 18 no. 4 (1984): 654-68.
- Forth, Gregory. "Animals, Witches, and Wind: Eastern Indonesian Variations on the" Thunder Complex"." Anthropos(1989): 89-106.
- Forth, Gregory. "Social and symbolic aspects of the witch among the Nage of eastern Indonesia." In C. W. Watson and R. F. Ellen, eds. Understanding witchcraft and sorcery in Southeast Asia. Honolulu: University of Hawaii Press. Pp. 99-122. 1993.
- Forth, Gregory. "Public affairs: institutionalized non-marital sex in an eastern Indonesian society." Bijdragen tot de Taal- Land- en Volkenkunde (Royal Institute, Leiden) 160 (2004): 315-338.
- Forth, Gregory. "Hominids, hairy hominoids and the science of humanity." Anthropology Today 21, no. 3 (2005): 13-17.
- Forth, Gregory. "Separating the dead: the ritual transformation of affinal exchange in central Flores." Journal of the Royal Anthropological Institute 15, no. 3 (2009): 557-574.
- Forth, Gregory. "Symbolic classification: Retrospective remarks on an unrecognized invention." Journal of the Royal Anthropological Institute. 16 (2010): 707-725.
- Forth, Gregory. "Cryptids, classification, and categories of cats: An ethnozoological study of unidentified felids from eastern Indonesia." Samantha Hurn, ed. Anthropology and Cryptozoology: Researching Encounters with Mysterious Creatures. London and New York: Routledge. Pp. 32-53. 2017.
- Forth, Gregory. "Elderly People Growing Tails: The Constitution of a Non-empirical Idea." Current Anthropology. 15 (2018):397-414.
- Forth, Gregory. "Living in Nage, or the Meaning of Life in an Eastern Indonesian Society." Oceania 88 (2018): 168-82.
- Forth, Gregory. "Are legendary hominoids worth looking for? Views from ethnobiology and palaeoanthropology." Anthropology Today 28, no. 2 (2012): 13-16.
- Forth, Gregory. "Rites of passage." The international encyclopedia of anthropology (2018): 1-7.
- Forth, Gregory. "Mountain Turtles and Giant Crabs: Cosmological Implications and Supernatural Understandings of Rare Creatures on an Eastern Indonesian Island." Anthrozoös 35 (2022): 495-513.
- Forth, Gregory. "Making Fun of Animals: Ontological Implications of Rituals and Taboos Observed in Geographically and Linguistically Discontinuous Regions of Southeast Asia and Southwestern China." Oceania 92 (2022): 267–286. doi:10.1002/ocea.5345
- Forth, Gregory. "The Cooked Child: Urban Legends and Ancient Myths from the Malayo-Polynesian-Speaking World." Folklore 134 (2023): 323-343.
- Forth, Gregory. "What ancient Taiwanese Negritos might tell us about mystery hominoids in Indonesia." Toby Openshaw and Dean Karalekas, eds. Seeking the Koko’ Ta’ay: Investigating the origins of little people myths in Taiwan and beyond, pp. 232-59. Leiden: Brill. 2024
- Forth, Gregory. "Local knowledge of Komodo dragons (Varanus komodoensis) in north-central Flores Island (Indonesia) and implications for conservation of the species." Pacific Conservation Biology 31 (2025): 1-15.
