= A Dog Pissing at the Edge of a Path =

2019 book by Gregory Forth

A Dog Pissing at the Edge of a Path: Animal Metaphors in an Eastern Indonesian Society
- Cover
- Author: Gregory Forth
- Language: English
- Subject: Metaphor, ethnozoology, human-animal relations, Nage people
- Publisher: McGill-Queen's University Press
- Publication date: 2019
- Publication place: Montreal and Kingston, Canada
- Pages: 388
- Awards: Diagram Prize for Oddest Book Title of the Year (2020)
- ISBN: 978-0-7735-5923-3

A Dog Pissing at the Edge of a Path: Animal Metaphors in an Eastern Indonesian Society is a 2019 ethnographic study by Gregory Forth, a Canadian anthropologist and Fellow of the Royal Society of Canada. The book documents 566 animal metaphors used by the Nage people, a small-scale agricultural society in central Flores, Indonesia, based on more than three decades of the author's fieldwork. Forth explores the indigenous Nage concept of pata péle ("covering speech") and argues that the Nage understand their metaphors as figurative expressions in much the same way as speakers of European languages, a position that challenges claims made by proponents of anthropology's "ontological turn" that non-Western societies conceive of human-animal relations in fundamentally different terms. The title refers to a Nage expression for someone who starts a task but is continually distracted, somewhat comparable to the English idiom "pissing about." The book won the Diagram Prize for Oddest Book Title of the Year in 2020.

== Background ==
Forth first began fieldwork among the Nage in the early 1980s, having previously conducted doctoral research on the neighboring island of Sumba. He selected the Nage partly because at the time, virtually nothing had been written about them in the anthropological literature. Over the course of approximately 35 years of fieldwork, he developed an interest in animal metaphors as part of learning the Nage language. Forth originally intended to include a treatment of these metaphors in his 2016 book on Nage folk zoology, Why the Porcupine Is Not a Bird, but found there were too many to accommodate in that volume. He instead wrote A Dog Pissing at the Edge of a Path based on field research conducted between 1984 and 2018.

== Summary ==
The book is an ethnographic study based on over three decades of field research among the Nage people, a small-scale society of subsistence cultivators, hunters, and livestock raisers in central Flores, eastern Indonesia. It documents and analyzes 566 conventional animal metaphors that the Nage employ in everyday speech and song, drawing on approximately 140 different named kinds of animals.

The title derives from a Nage expression describing someone who begins a task but is regularly distracted, comparable to the English idiom "pissing about." The study originated as material for Forth's earlier work on Nage folk zoology but grew too substantial for inclusion there. Forth positions the study within broader anthropological debates about metaphor, critically engaging with the "ontological turn," which holds that non-Western peoples may conceive of human-animal relations in fundamentally different ways from Westerners. Through his detailed analysis of the Nage corpus, Forth argues that the Nage understand their animal metaphors as conventional figurative expressions rather than statements of literal identity between humans and animals.

The book opens with chapters situating the Nage geographically and linguistically, explaining the fieldwork methodology, and exploring the indigenous Nage concept of pata péle, roughly translated as "covering" or "screened-off" speech. This term emphasizes separation and concealment: a metaphor places a verbal screen between what is said and what is meant. The central five chapters present the corpus organized by animal type. The third chapter treats domestic mammals, including water buffalo, horses, cattle, sheep, goats, dogs, pigs, and cats. The fourth covers exclusively wild mammals such as deer, porcupines, rats, civets, and monkeys. The fifth chapter, the longest, discusses bird metaphors. The sixth addresses non-mammalian vertebrates including snakes, lizards, crocodiles, fish, and frogs, while the seventh treats invertebrates.

Throughout, each metaphor is presented with its English translation, the original Nage expression, and recognized referents, followed by commentary on usage, motivation, and cross-linguistic comparisons. Mammals predominate, accounting for over 42 percent of the total, followed by birds at 31 percent. This distribution broadly resembles patterns found in English animal metaphors. Quantitative analysis reveals that Nage metaphors overwhelmingly express negative evaluations of their subjects, with four-fifths motivated by empirically observable attributes of the animals rather than by culturally specific beliefs or symbolic associations involving the same species..

The eighth chapter analyzes why some animals serve as more productive metaphorical vehicles than others, finding that familiarity and spatial proximity matter more than economic value or ritual significance. The final chapter considers what the metaphors reveal about social values and ontological assumptions. Most metaphors with human referents criticize dishonesty, sexual misconduct, laziness, or antisocial behavior, though some describe admired qualities.

Forth argues that the evidence contradicts claims by proponents of the ontological turn that non-Western peoples do not distinguish figurative from literal speech. The Nage, he concludes, recognize their animal metaphors as figurative fictions expressing partial similarities between human and animal behaviors, not statements of identity or transformation.

== Critical reception ==
Clifford Sather described the work as "admirable" and characterized it as "an exemplary ethnography, thoroughly exploring the cultural significance, variety and complexity of metaphoric expressions in a single society." Sather pointed out to Forth's dual contribution: presenting an extensive corpus of 566 metaphors while also offering a timely account of how anthropologists have defined and used the concept of metaphor. Based on his own fieldwork among the Iban of Borneo, Sather observed that similar conceptions of metaphor as "concealed speech" appear widespread in the Austronesian languages. He found persuasive the argument that the Nage understand their metaphors in essentially the same way as Westerners do, "not as expressions of differing ways of experiencing and making sense of the world, but as a form of figurative speech in which they use animals to talk about things that are not animals."

Cynthia Fowler, an anthropologist who has worked on nearby Sumba Island, praised the work's scholarly merit while also acknowledging its appeal to a niche audience. Fowler highlighted the clever quantitative analyses Forth performed on the 566 examples and stressed his critical engagement with debates between cognitive universalists and ontological pluralists. She thought that Forth presented "a strong argument against ontological pluralism and for a cognitive universalism" in which people worldwide regard humans and animals as belonging to separate categories. Fowler described the compendium as demonstrating "the ethnozoological richness and faunal diversity of Central Nage territory". She also suggested that the work could function as an alternate field guide to Flores Island fauna.

== Awards ==
- Diagram Prize for Oddest Book Title of the Year (2020)
