= Between Ape and Human: An Anthropologist on the Trail of a Hidden Hominoid =

2022 book by Gregory Forth

- Cover
- Author: Gregory Forth
- Language: English
- Subject: Anthropology, Ethnozoology, Homo floresiensis
- Publisher: Pegasus Books
- Publication date: May 3, 2022
- Publication place: United States
- Media type: Print (hardcover, paperback), e-book, audiobook
- Pages: 336
- ISBN: 978-1-63936-143-4
- OCLC: 1302307915
- Preceded by: A Dog Pissing at the Edge of a Path: Animal Metaphors in an Eastern Indonesian (2019)

Between Ape and Human: An Anthropologist on the Trail of a Hidden Hominoid is a 2022 book by Canadian anthropologist and Fellow of the Royal Society of Canada Gregory Forth, published by Pegasus Books. Forth presents his ethnographic research among the Lio people of east central Flores, Indonesia, documenting their accounts of small, humanlike creatures called "lai ho'a" (ape-men) and investigating possible connections to Homo floresiensis, the fossil hominin species discovered on the island in 2003. Based on fieldwork conducted between 2003 and 2018, Forth collected more than one hundred accounts, including over thirty from individuals who claimed to have seen the creatures. It is considered Forth's first work written for a general audience. The book generated debate among scholars regarding the nature of evidence in anthropology and the plausibility of surviving non-sapiens hominins.

== Background ==
Forth conducted ethnographic research on the Indonesian island of Flores beginning in 1984, investigating topics including marriage practices, indigenous cosmology, and local knowledge of animals. During that initial fieldwork among the Nage people of west central Flores, he first heard reports of small-bodied, hairy hominoids said to have once inhabited the island. In June 2003, while conducting research in the Lio region of east central Flores, Forth encountered accounts of creatures called "lai ho'a," described by local people as rare but still surviving in their territory. The discovery of Homo floresiensis at the Liang Bua cave site in western Flores was announced in October 2004, more than a year after Forth had begun collecting Lio accounts. The local name "lai ho'a" appears in a German-Lio dictionary compiled by the missionary Paul Arndt in 1933, indicating that the concept predates both the fossil discovery and Forth's research. Struck by what he perceived as similarities between paleoanthropological reconstructions of Homo floresiensis and the Lio descriptions of ape-men, Forth continued fieldwork during eight subsequent visits to the Lio region between 2005 and 2018, collecting material that formed the basis of the book.

== Summary ==
Forth, who spent more than four years conducting ethnographic fieldwork on Flores over the course of numerous field trips spanning several decades, collected descriptions and reports from more than a hundred informants, including both general accounts and eyewitness testimonies. The book, his first directed to a general audience, considers whether these indigenous accounts might represent encounters with a surviving non-sapiens hominin, possibly related to Homo floresiensis, the diminutive fossil species discovered in western Flores in 2003 and popularly nicknamed "the hobbit." After learning of the Lio ape-men in 2003, Forth continued his research on the subject through 2018.

The work is organized into four parts. The first, tracing what people say about ape-men as natural or supernatural beings, opens with a chapter introducing Flores Island's geography and unique fauna, including the Komodo dragon and the world's largest rat, before turning to Lio descriptions of the lai ho'a. Forth documents these creatures as Lio understand them: small-bodied bipedal hominoids standing approximately one meter tall, possessing hairy bodies, lacking tools, fire, clothing, or language, and inhabiting remote highland forests. He distinguishes the ape-men from indigenous spirits in Lio thought, pointing out that unlike bodiless supernatural entities, the lai ho'a are described as mortal creatures with physical bodies that reproduce, die, and can be observed by multiple people simultaneously. The author addresses how the ape-men occupy an ambiguous cognitive space, portrayed as like humans and yet not like them, fitting some categorical expectations but not others. He also shows how imported supernatural figures from Javanese popular culture, especially television elves called "kurcaci" and "tuyul," have become conflated with indigenous ape-man concepts in recent decades.

The second part explores myths and legends featuring ape-men. Forth recounts origin stories that describe the creatures as descended from humans who were expelled from communities for antisocial behavior, as well as narratives about ancestors burning caves to exterminate hominoid populations that had been stealing crops and livestock. These myths have parallels in other regions of Flores, including the "ebu gogo" tradition of the Nagé region, where similar creatures are described as having been driven to extinction centuries ago.

Part three contains eyewitness accounts, which Forth presents as the evidentiary core of the book. These range from what he deems to be questionable reports that may reflect misidentified monkeys or dreamlike experiences to what the author considers compelling testimonies. Among the latter are accounts of dead specimens observed by road construction workers in the 1970s, sightings by multiple witnesses of living creatures in highland areas, and a 2017 report from a woman who claimed to have seen a lai ho'a crossing a stream. Forth acknowledges that the least plausible sightings suggest encounters with more familiar creatures, and that many reports concern sightings either after nightfall or in darkened caves where visibility was limited. However, one report describes a lai ho'a struck and killed by a truck, and this and other sightings took place in daylight. Forth evaluates these accounts against psychological research on memory and eyewitness reliability, noting that witnesses who reported emotional disturbance or fear during their encounters tend to provide more consistent and detailed descriptions. He also includes a chapter on extraterritorial sightings, describing reports from outside Lio territory, including observations by two educated Ngadha men who independently recounted seeing a small naked humanlike figure near the Ebu Lobo volcano in 1975, and a 1982 encounter on the neighboring island of Sumbawa in which British anthropologist Michael Hitchcock reported seeing a group of small bipedal primates that stood upright and behaved unlike any monkeys he had previously encountered in Indonesia. Throughout his fieldwork, Forth notes that he never encountered anyone among the Lio who did not consider the lai ho'a to be real.

In the final part of the book, Forth addresses questions of interpretation and credibility. For example, he compares Lio descriptions of ape-men with paleoanthropological reconstructions of Homo floresiensis, noting correspondences in estimated height, facial features, bipedal locomotion, possible climbing ability, and habitat preferences. Forth emphasizes the australopithecine-like and even chimpanzee-like qualities of Homo floresiensis, including its primitive wrist structure and long feet, and questions assumptions often attached to its placement in the genus Homo. He notes that the presumed extinction date of fifty to sixty thousand years ago is inferred from a single site, and that given the rarity of fossilization and subsequent discovery, the last known fossil almost certainly does not represent the last surviving member of that species. He considers alternative explanations for the ape-man accounts, including the possibility that sightings represent misidentified monkeys, exotic apes transported to Flores, short-statured human populations such as Negrito groups known elsewhere in Southeast Asia, or purely imaginary beings. He also references evidence from Red Deer cave in China suggesting possible late survival of archaic hominins alongside modern humans.

== Reviews ==
Writing in the journal Current Anthropology, Andrew J. Strathern and Pamela J. Stewart characterized the work as "a major tour de force" that intervenes in debates about human evolution by examining contemporary indigenous accounts of entities intermediate between modern humans and earlier hominins. Strathern and Stewart praised Forth's methodology for remaining firmly grounded in fieldwork while raising broader questions about cognition, evidence, and reality. They noted that throughout the book, the author neither simply believes in nor rejects the Lio ape-men accounts, instead rigorously considering all possibilities by relying on both Lio narratives and available scientific evidence. They found the work valuable for its open-minded approach to what indigenous stories signify and for making technical arguments readable without forcing debates to a single conclusion.

Miriam Belmaker identified the ethnographic documentation as the foremost strength of the volume, noting that in an era when indigenous languages are being lost, firsthand anthropological accounts play a critical role in preserving such stories for future scholars. Belmaker found the final section, in which Forth presents his thesis about the possible survival of a living descendant of Homo floresiensis, to be the weaker part of the book. Belmaker argued that the connection drawn between indigenous accounts and the presence of an unrecognized hominin species was "tenuous at best," comparing the Lio eyewitness accounts to historical European stories of unicorns, basilisks, and werewolves that would not constitute scientific evidence for the existence of such creatures.

David P. Barash, a reviewer for the Wall Street Journal, acknowledged Forth as a highly reputable scholar and scrupulous researcher who spent more than four years on Flores over numerous field trips. Barash observed that claims about the lai ho'a are rendered more credible than reports of creatures like Sasquatch or Yeti by the existence of genuine fossil antecedents on the island. However, Barash argued that Forth presents no conclusive evidence that descendants of Homo floresiensis currently exist, and that instead of making a direct case for contemporary hobbits, the author takes "a deep dive into Lio beliefs about the lai ho'a in myth, legend, religion and rumor." He found that while many sightings occurred at night or in conditions of limited visibility, Forth nonetheless concluded that most people who think they witnessed something have actually witnessed it.

Jeffery Meldrum described the work as an important contribution to navigating the relationship between palaeontological and ethnographic evidence. He emphasized that Forth's proposal about the possible existence of relict hominoids preceded the announcement of Homo floresiensis by several years, lending the work a prophetic quality. Meldrum praised the author for providing a replete enumeration of correlations between contemporary ape-man descriptions and the physical and behavioral attributes of the fossil hominin, and for explicitly questioning the dismissal of these similarities as merely coincidental.

In her review for Forbes, Rebecca Coffey found the book fascinating and recommended it as an adventure read.
