= Namut–Nginamanu language =

Austronesian language spoken in Flores, Indonesia

Namut–Nginamanu
- Native to: Indonesia
- Region: central Flores
- Ethnicity: Ngada
- Language family: Austronesian: Malayo-Polynesian; Central–Eastern MP; Sumba–Flores; Ende–Manggarai; Central Flores; Namut–Nginamanu
- Dialects: Namut; Nginamanu

Language codes
- ISO 639-3: None (mis)
- Glottolog: namu1249

Namut and Nginamanu are dialects of a language of central Flores, in East Nusa Tenggara Province, Indonesia. They are closely related to Ngadha.
