= Ngada people =

Ngada
Ata Ngada
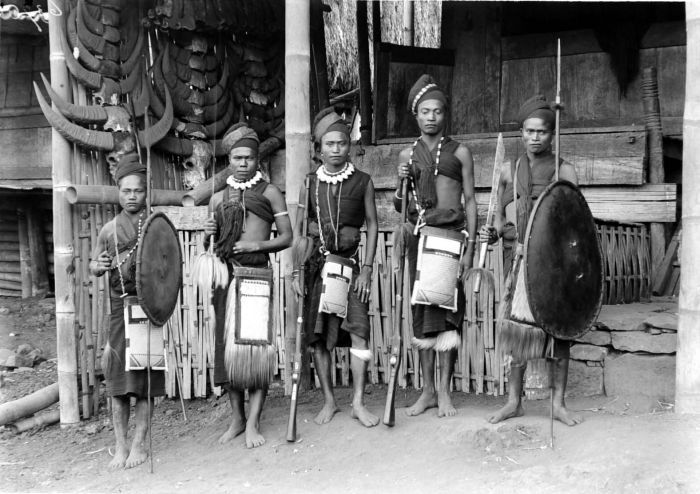
- Ngada men in a warrior costume with a spear, rifle, and shield, circa 1915–1918.

Total population
- 155,000 (1975)

Regions with significant populations
- Indonesia (Ngada)

Languages
- Ngada, Namut–Nginamanu, and Indonesian

Religion
- Catholicism (majority), Islam, Protestantism, and traditional beliefs

Related ethnic groups
- Manggarai • Nage • Riung

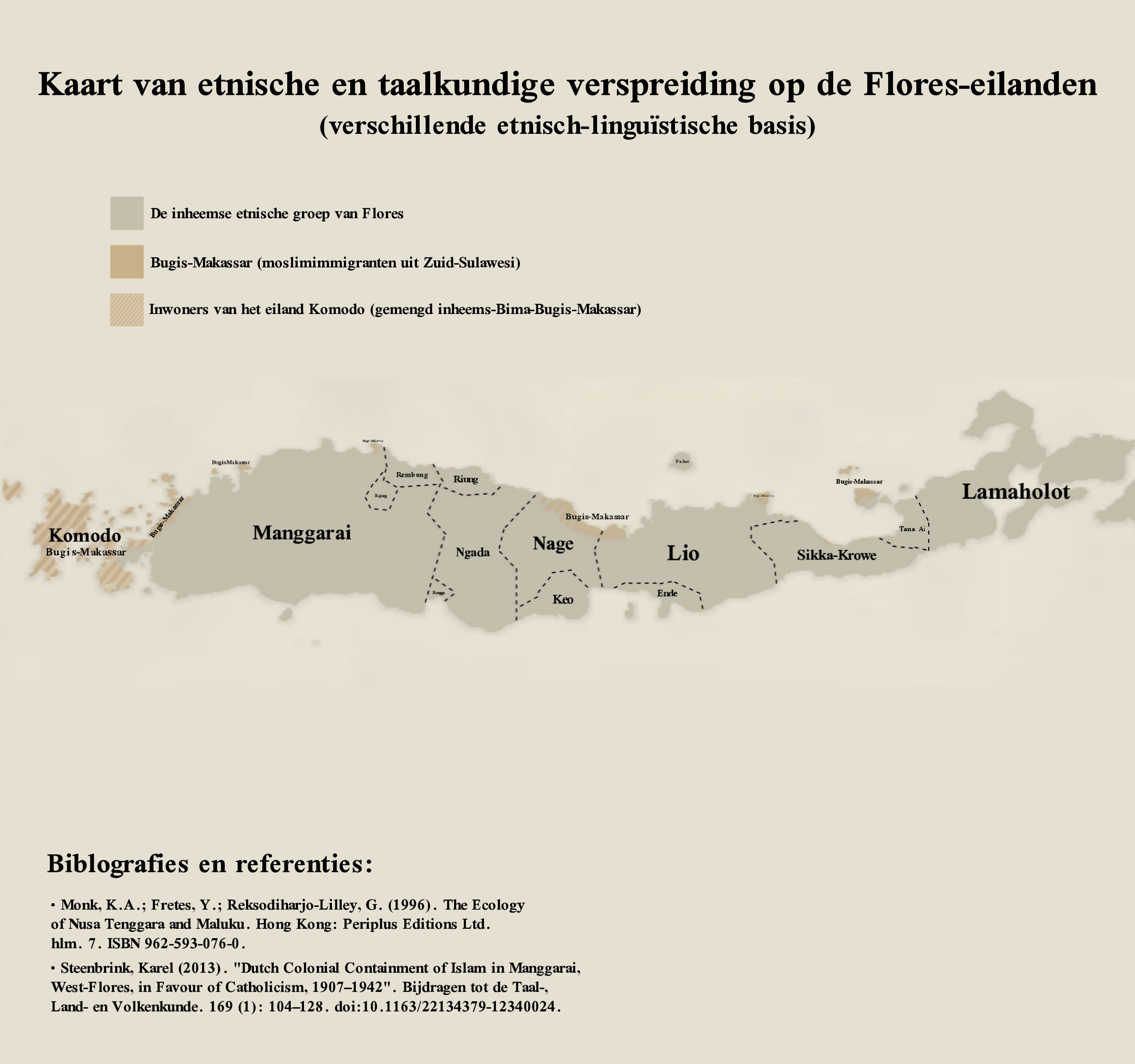
The distribution of the Ngada people in Flores borders the Manggarai people in the west and the Nage people in the east, as well as with other ethnic groups, such as the Rongga, Riung, and Keo.

The Ngada people (Ata Ngada; also known as Ngadha, Nad'a, Nga'da, Bajawa, or Rokka) are an ethnic group inhabiting the central part of Flores Island, especially in Ngada Regency. The Ngada population numbers around 155,000 people. They belong to the Bima–Sumba-speaking group.

Ngada are descendants of the indigenous people of Flores Island. The coastal inhabitants are influenced by the culture of the Malays, Bimanese, Buginese, and Makassarese. The majority of them adhere to Roman Catholicism, while some mountain dwellers still maintain their traditional beliefs.

== Livelihood ==
Traditionally, they engage in agriculture, cultivating rice, corn, millet, and cash crops – beans, squash, peanuts, vegetables, and spices. Apart from that, their other livelihoods are hunting, gathering, and livestock farming. Weaving crafts are widespread, and some are involved in metalworking. Their main commodities are primarily plant-based foods, while meat is consumed during festive occasions.

== Language ==
Their native language is the Ngada language (incl. the Namut–Nginamanu dialect chain), which belongs to the large Austronesian language family. It is related to nearby languages spoken on Flores Island and its surroundings (incl. Nage–Kéo, Ende, Lio, and Palue, which are part of the Central Flores language family), as well as the Manggarai language.There is a publication about Ngada language and culture. In the 20th century, the missionary Paul Arndt conducted research in the region.

== Classification and differences ==
They mostly reside in Ngada Regency. However, this area is also inhabited by other ethnic groups, which can sometimes lead to misunderstandings. Specifically, the Ngada people are the indigenous inhabitants of the Bajawa region. Nearby communities, such as the Riung, Rongga, Nage, Keo, and Palue, are sometimes considered sub-groups of the Ngada or related population groups. The publication Encyclopedia of Ethnic Groups in Indonesia (2015) uses the term "Ngada" broadly, estimating their population at 155,000 based on 1975 data.

== Social structure ==
The social structure of the Ngada people is based on a matrilineal family system, which sets them apart from some of their neighboring ethnic groups.

== See also ==
- Ngada Regency
- Ngada language
