= Mbay (Indonesia) =

Coordinates: 8°34′S 121°16′E

Mbay (local pronunciation: [ᵐbaj]) is a small town on the north coast of Flores Island, Indonesia, which serves as the administrative capital of Nagekeo Regency (within East Nusa Tenggara Province).

== Aesesa District ==
The administrative district (kecamatan) which includes and surrounds the town of Mbay comprises six urban villages (kelurahan) and 12 rural villages (desa), listed below with their areas and their populations as at mid 2024:

Kode Wilayah	Name of kelurahan or desa	Area in km^{2}	Pop'n Estimate mid 2024
53.06.01.2004	Tedamude	29.30	943
53.16.01.2016	Tedakisa	26.37	1,167
53.16.01.2002	Labolewa	25.61	2,116
53.16.01.2008	Olaia	18.84	1,816
53.15.01.2015	Ngegedhawe	27.24	1,130
53.16.01.2017	Nggolombay	7.50	1,273
53.16.01.2006	Nggolonio	42.58	1,889
53.06.01.2014	Waekokak	9.99	1,837
53.16.01.2013	Tonggurambang	11.78	1,632

Kode Wilayah	Name of kelurahan or desa	Area in km^{2}	Pop'n Estimate mid 2024
53.16.01.2012	Marapokot	7.05	2,313
53.16.01.2018	Nangadhero	1.87	1,940
53.15.01.2010	Aeramo	43.08	6,424
53.16.01.1001	Dhawe	21.71	2,424
53.16.01.1011	Lape	29.58	4,066
53.06.01.1009	Danga ^{(a)}	12.08	8,982
53.16.01.1005	Towak	31.15	1,254
53.16.01.1007	Mbay II	33.48	1,771
53.16.01.1003	Mbay I	12.12	4,374
	Totals	391.31	47,351 ^{(b)}

 

Notes: (a) Danga is the administrative centre of Aesesa District, and forms the main urban part of Mbay town. (b) comprising 23,728 males and 23,623 females.

The 6 kelurahan are those villages listed last in the above table - Danga, Dhawe, Lape, Mbay I, Mbay II and Towak.
