= Keo people =

Ethnic group in Indonesia

ʼAta Kéo
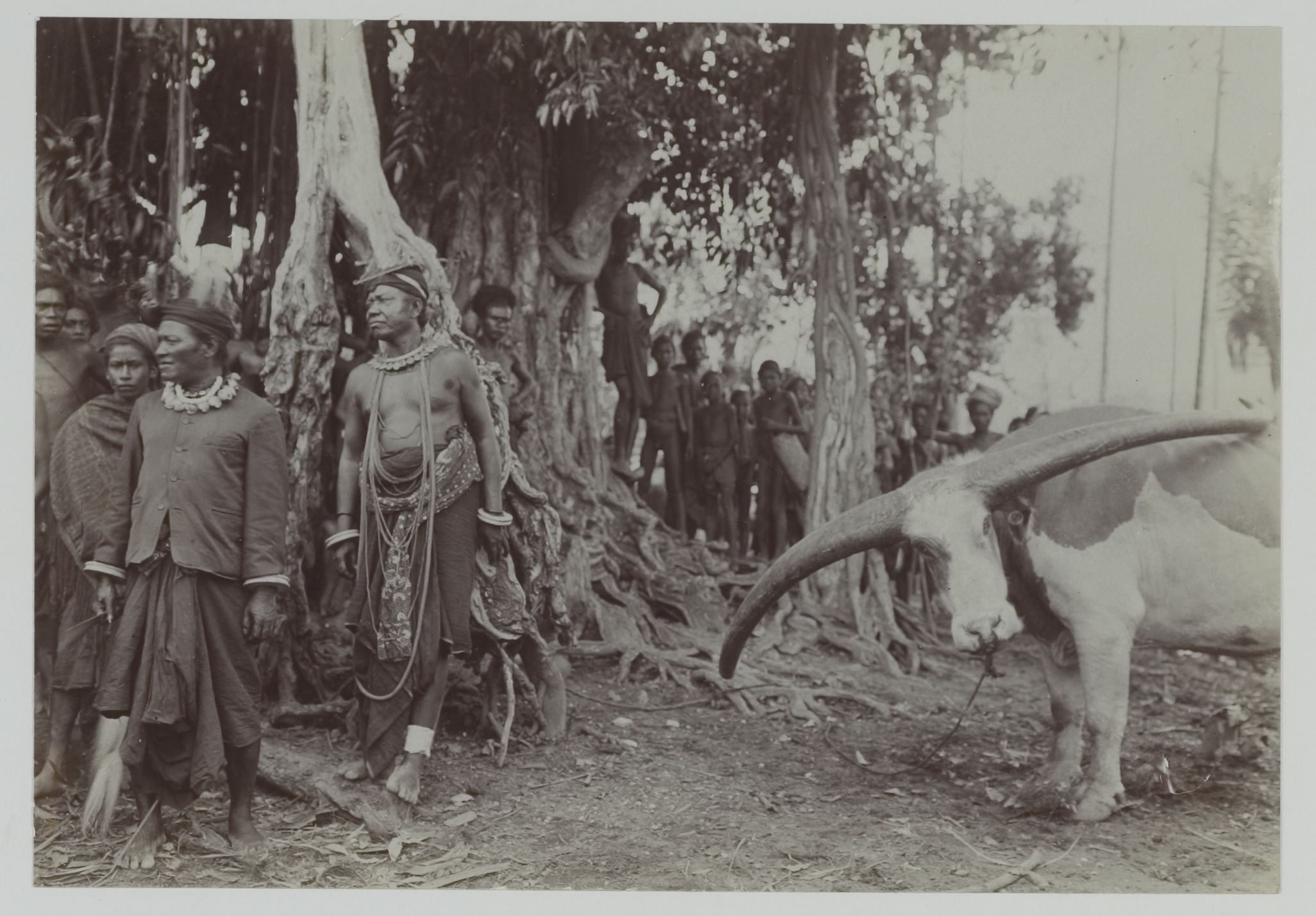
- Raja Roga Ngole (front left) of the Nage-Keo with a water buffalo to be sacrificed at the harvest ceremony in Boawae, Nagekeo Regency, around the 1920s.

Total population
- 40,000 (2001)

Regions with significant populations
- Indonesia (Nagekeo, Flores Island)

Languages
- Keo, Indonesian

Religion
- Catholicism (majority), Islam, Protestantism, and indigenous beliefs (minority)

Related ethnic groups
- Ngada • Nage • Lio

The Keo people (Ke'o: ʼAta Kéo; Indonesian: Orang Keo) are an Austronesian ethnic group inhabiting the central–southern region of Flores Island, Indonesia. They occupy the area along the southern slopes of Mount Ebulobo, covering parts of Boawae, Mauponggo, and Mount Koto in Keo Tengah and Kedi Diru in Nangaroro, Nagekeo Regency. The Keo people have kinship ties with the Nage people to their north.

== History ==
=== Dutch colonial era ===
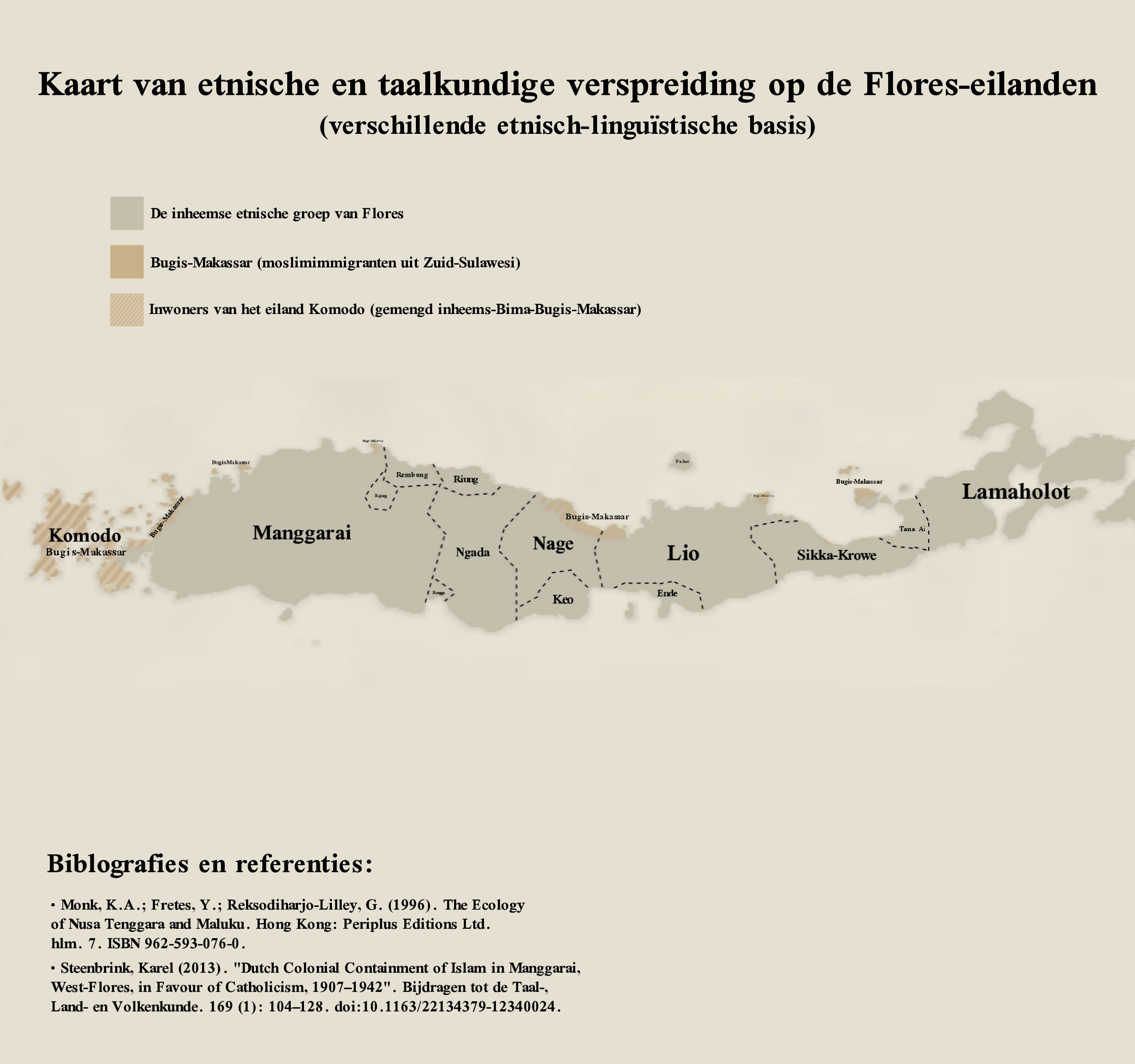
Map of ethnic and linguistic distribution on Flores and the surrounding small islands; the territory of the Keo lies south of the Nage people.

In Dutch publications, the name Keo (Kéo) appears in the reports of Freijss (1860), referring to a group of fishing communities living along the central southern coast of Flores, distinguishing them from the closely related Nage people. At the same time, Freijss recorded "Kéo Peak" (Dutch: Kéopiek), by which he meant Mount Ebulobo.

According to historical notes and oral traditions, long before the mass arrival of Portuguese and Dutch missionaries and traders in Flores, the name Kéo was already known to Portuguese Dominican missionaries, who had explored areas such as Kewa, Mari, and Lena in the 16th century.

In various Dutch sources up to the 19th century, the name "Keo" appears to have been consistently used to refer to the entire region inhabited by both the Keo and Nage peoples.

Dutch colonial intervention in this region came relatively late—only in 1907—compared to many other areas in Indonesia. Upon arriving in the archipelago, including Keo, colonial officials began restructuring local governance to match colonial administrative models, referencing indigenous social organization structures. Transitions and administrative changes occurred frequently, as foreign rulers struggled to reconcile their system with local customary structures.

However, the political situation shifted by the 1920s, and Dutch authorities became more willing to consult local customary leaders. The entire archipelago was divided into gewesten or provinces, headed by a governor or resident.

In the Lesser Sunda Islands, some local leaders—customary elders (adathoofden or mosalaki) and land overseers (grondvoogden or ine tana ame watu)—were incorporated into colonial administration. Until the 1910s, Dutch officials often viewed the Keo region as inhabited by a stubborn, hard-to-govern population. This impression arose because two local rebellions took place in Keo around that time: a rebellion led by Kaka Dupa in the Tana Dea region (1907), and the Sela Lejo rebellion led by Lewa Wula (1912).

The Dutch, typically applying the strategy of divide et impera (divide and conquer) adopted a policy of unifica et impera (unite and rule) in Keo. Facing non-cooperation from the Keo population and needing administrative regions based on shared culture, language, and social organization, the Dutch treated Keo as part of the Nage district, registering all Keo villages as Nage in colonial records of the 1910s.

The background to this unification attempt was the unstable sociopolitical situation in Keo from 1908 to 1912, largely fueled by discontent over taxes and the heerendiensten (forced labor) system.

In 1913, after the Sela Lejo rebellion, a major meeting was held in Wajo village, at which Muwa Tunga of Kota village was selected as interim local administrator. Muwa Tunga established Kota village as the district center, later known as Kota Keo.

As unrest subsided, A.R. Herns, a colonial official, proposed in 1915 that Keo and Nage be unified into one landschap (district) called "Nage" and governed by Roga Ngole. The Dutch approved this in principle; however, at a meeting in Boawae on 8 April 1917, leaders from both Nage and Keo rejected the proposal. The Flores afdeeling leadership and the Ngada gezaghebber reported (20 April 1917, No. 798/15) to the Resident of Timor that Nage and Keo should not be united. Keo was to remain its own landschap with Muwa Tunga as administrator. A Dutch decree dated 28 November 1917 (No. 57) formally appointed Muwa Tunga as administrator (bestuurder), a role he had effectively held since 1913.

On 2 March 1918, in the presence of the Ngada gezaghebber, Muwa Tunga took his oath (korte verklaring), signed by him and witnesses. Under his leadership, the Keo landschap was divided into ten hamente, each led by a secundaire hoofd or kepala mere. Hamilton listed the ten hamente and their kepala mere as follows: Tonggo (Pua Mera), Riti (Goo Bhoko), Lewa (Aja Mbaa), Wajo (Aja Ari), Wuji (Mere Muku), Pau Tola (Ora Ari), Kota (Ego Ari), Sawu (Mite Ebu), Lejo (Tado Toyo), and Worowatu (Seme Rau).

Although a temporary administrative jurisdiction was established and later formalized with its capital at Bajawa, the Dutch continued to explore the possibility of unifying the Keo and Nage people during the first two decades of colonial rule. Another attempt failed in 1928. Three years later, on 26 January 1931, unification was finally achieved. The Nagekeo swapraja (self-governing domain) was established and lasted until 1950.

According to incomplete written and oral sources, although Nagekeo unification succeeded, the Keo Tengah hamente continued to operate under a succession of leaders: Goa Tunga, Yosef Taa, Frans Tua Bara, Mikhael Bhebhe, and Felix Dhedhu. These hamente later became the Keo subdistrict, which was further divided into East Keo (Nangaroro, Nagekeo), West Keo (Mauponggo, Nagekeo), and Central Keo with its center in Maundai (the region of the Worowatu hamente).

=== Indonesian era ===
Under modern administrative structure, Keo was originally part of Ngada Regency. Based on a decree of the Governor of East Nusa Tenggara from 22 February 1962 (PEM.66/1/2), the name "Keo" was retained as one of six subdistricts of Ngada Regency.

A year later, a new gubernatorial decree dated 22 July 1963 (PEM.66/1/32) divided Keo into two subdistricts: West Keo (Mauponggo) and East Keo (Nangaroro).

Then, based on decree PEM.9/2002, a new subdistrict named Central Keo was formed, comprising eight villages from eastern Mauponggo, namely: Keli, Lewa Ngera, Wajo, Koto Wuji Timur, Koto Wuji Barat, Mbae Nuamuri, Worowatu, and Witu Romba Ua, as well as three villages from western Nangaroro: Koto Diru Mali, Lado Lima, and Pau Tola.

After the passage of Law No. 2/2007 on the Establishment of Nagekeo Regency, the subdistricts of West Keo, Central Keo, and East Keo became part of the newly formed Nagekeo Regency.

== Population ==
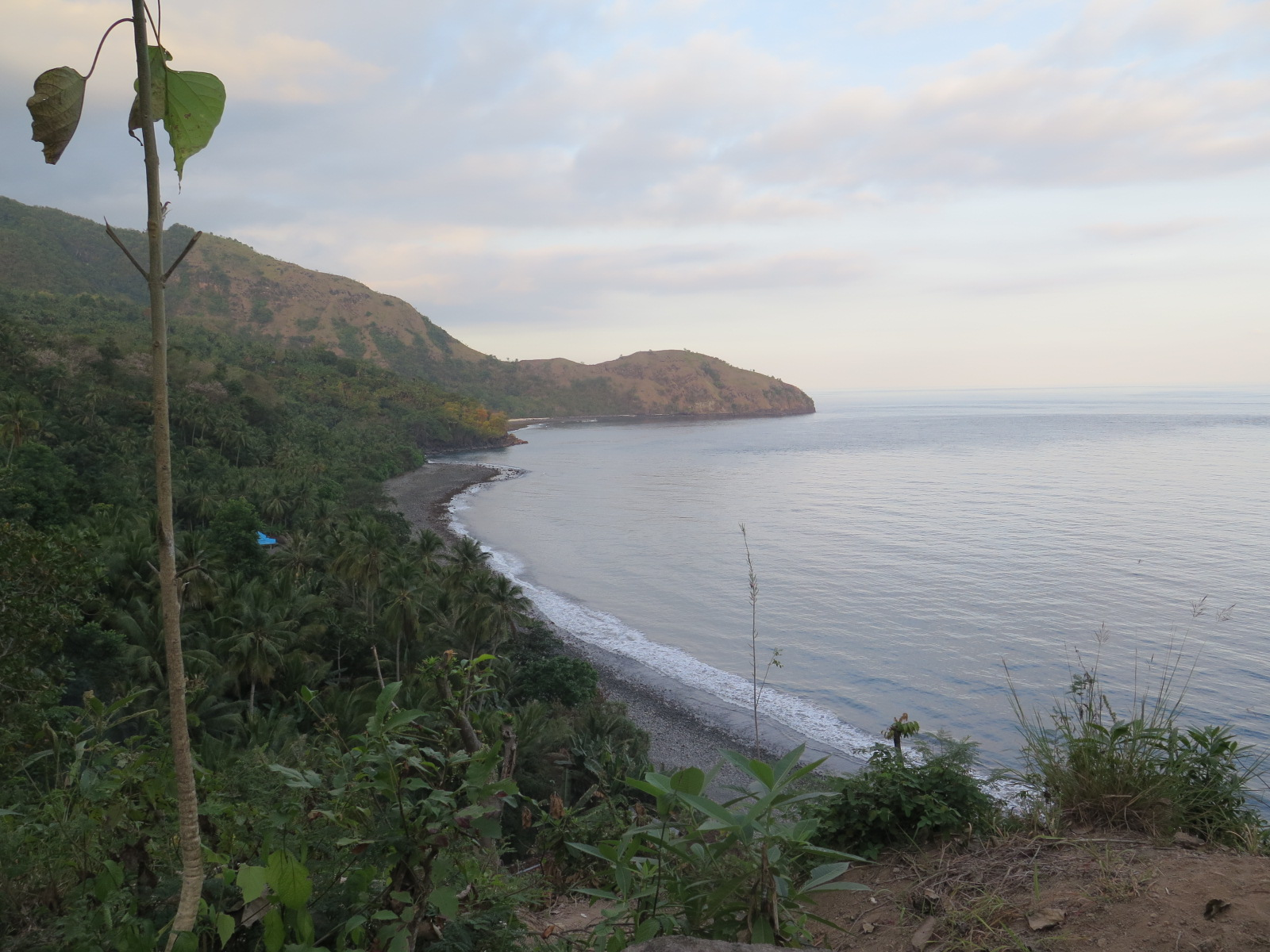
Mauwelu Bay, in the Keo homeland

According to the 2001 Ethnologue data, the Keo population numbered around 40,000 people, speaking the Keo language.

== Culture ==
=== Woven textiles ===
The Keo and the closely related Nage people share a weaving tradition, similar to other ethnic groups on Flores. Keo people refer to their types of woven cloth as Dawo Nangge, Duka Wo'i, and Dawo Ende.

== See also ==
- Nage people
- Nagekeo Regency
