= Nage people =

Nage
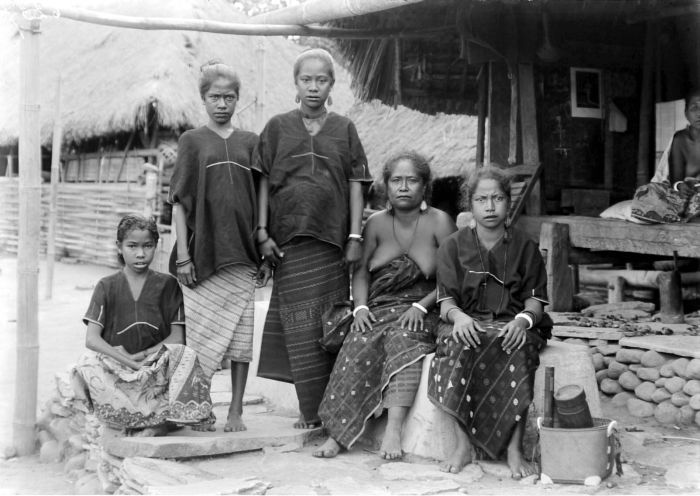
- Wife and daughters of Raga Noli, the Raja (King) of a village in Nage, Ngada Regency, East Nusa Tenggara (Flores), Indonesia

Total population
- 68,400

Regions with significant populations
- Indonesia (East Nusa Tenggara)

Languages
- Nage language, Indonesian language

Religion
- Roman Catholic Christian (predominantly), Islam, Folk

Related ethnic groups
- Keo • Ngada • Lio

The Nage are an indigenous people living on the eastern Indonesian islands of Flores (chiefly in the eponymous Nagekeo Regency), and Timor. They are descended from the indigenous population of Flores They are largely assimilated by the neighboring people. They speak Nage, one of the major languages in the Austronesian languages group.

== Agriculture ==
The Nage people mainly engaged in manual slash-and-burn farming (tubers, rice, corn), hunting and gathering. Until the middle of the 20th century, communal land ownership with large families participation were still preserved. They live in cumulus-type settlements, located on the slopes of mountains and surrounded by stone walls. Houses are piled up in rectangular position and connected by an open gallery into a single complex, which is intended for joint residence of several large families.

== Lifestyle ==
The clothes of the Nage people are loincloth and skirt or kain. Women fasten it over the breast, and men around the waist. The diet is dominated by plant based foods (cooked groats and tubers with spicy seasoning), while meat is eaten only on holidays. Agrarian cults have survived and are still being practiced. Before the sowing, rites of cleansing the field and the grains of rice will be performed on the first new moon, before the start of cultivating the fields.

== Study of the tribe ==
In 1940, Officer Louis Fontijne produced a Dutch Colonial Service study entitled Grondvoogden in Kelimado (Guardians of the land in Kelimado), Kelimado being a region included in the Nage district of central Flores. Commissioned as an investigation of indigenous land tenure and leadership, the study was the only comprehensive description of Nage society and culture produced during the colonial period.

In 1983, anthropologist Gregory Forth renewed interest in the tribe, revisiting the islands while seeking a copy of Fontijne's complete study.

Forth has also hypothesized a possible connection between the local stories of the Ebu Gogo, a creature in Nage mythology, and the discovery of Homo floresiensis, a possible species of extinct hominid, hence a renewed interest in the tribe.

== See also ==
- Proto-Malay
