= Nagekeo Regency =

Regency in East Nusa Tenggara, Indonesia

Nagekeo Regency Kabupaten Nagekeo
- Regency
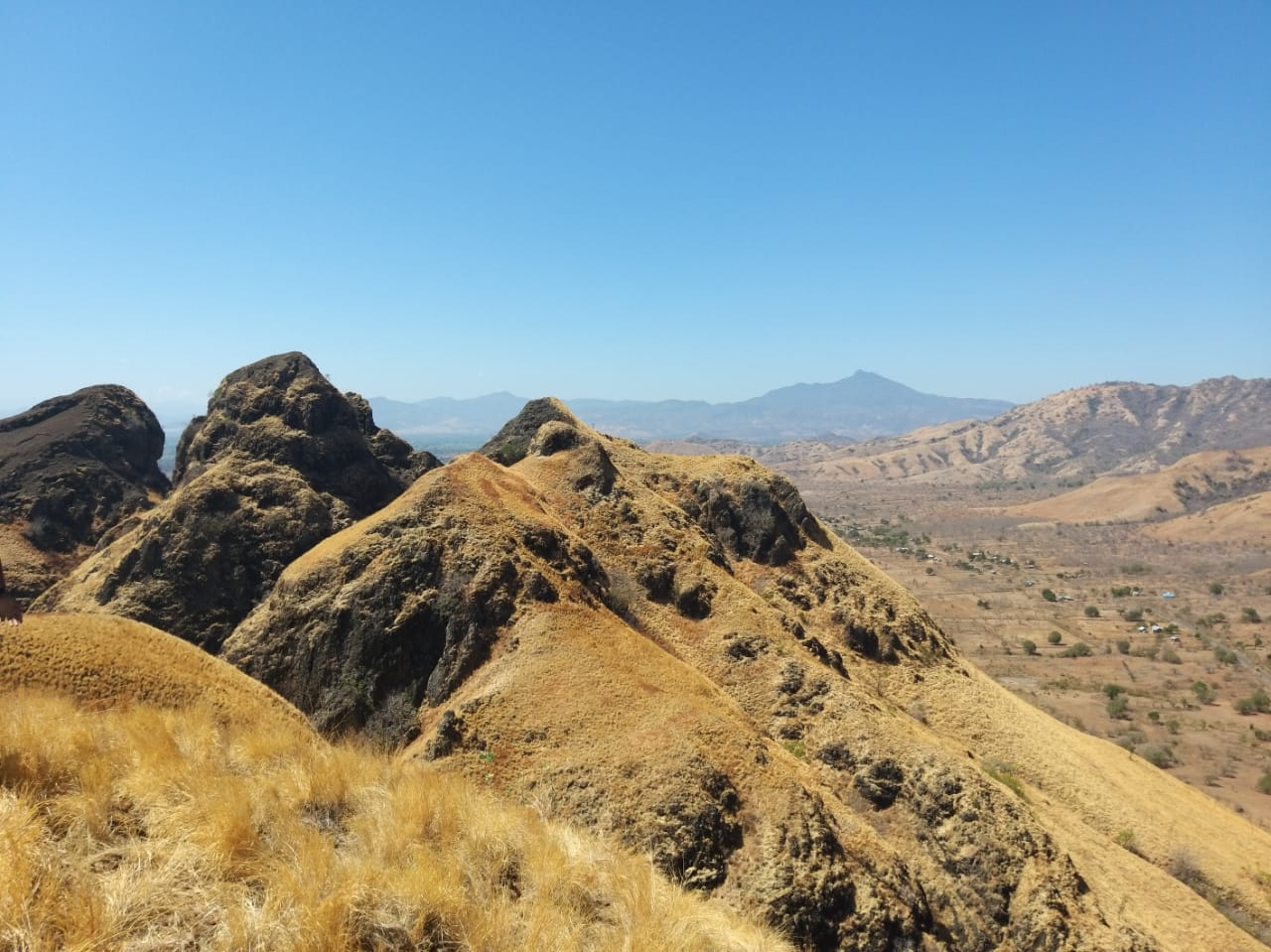
- Landscape of Weworowet hill

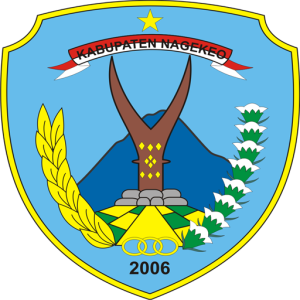
- Coat of arms

- Location within East Nusa Tenggara

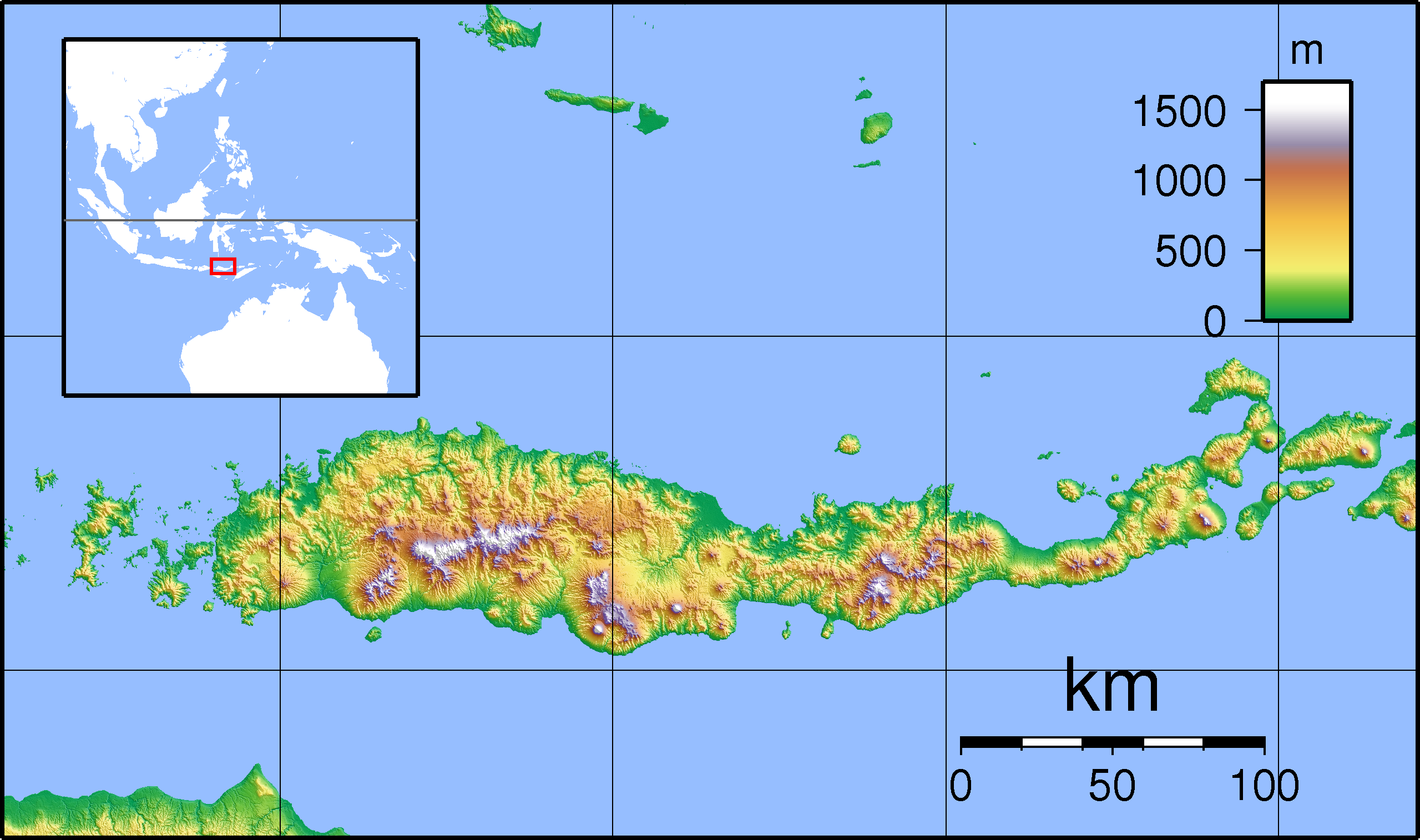
- Location in Flores, Lesser Sunda Islands and Indonesia Nagekeo Regency (Lesser Sunda Islands) Nagekeo Regency (Indonesia)
- Coordinates: 8.8721°S 121.2096°E
- Country: Indonesia
- Region: Lesser Sunda Islands
- Province: East Nusa Tenggara
- Capital: Mbay

Government
  - Regent: Simplisius Donatus
  - Vice Regent: Gonzalo Gratianus Muga Sada

Area
  - Total: 1,398.08 km^{2} (539.80 sq mi)

Population (mid 2025 estimate)
  - Total: 179,669
  - Density: 128.511/km^{2} (332.843/sq mi)
- Time zone: UTC+8 (ICST)
- Area code: (+62) 380
- Website: nagekeokab.go.id

Nagekeo Regency (sometimes written as Nagé Kéo) is a regency on the island of Flores in East Nusa Tenggara province of Indonesia, comprising the territory of the Nage people in the south (in Mauponggo, Keo Tengah, Nangaroro and Boawae Districts) and of the Kéo people in the north (in Aesesa, Aesesa Selatan and Wolowae Districts). It covers an area of 1,398.08 km^{2} and had a population of 130,120 at the 2010 Census, and 159,732 at the 2020 Census; the official estimate as of mid-2025 was 179,669 (comprising 83,334 males and 86,335 females). The regency was established on 2 January 2007 by separation of the former eastern districts from Ngada Regency; it has its administrative seat (capital) in the town of Mbay on the north coast of Flores, in Aesesa District. It is bordered to the west by the residual Ngada Regency and to the east by Ende Regency, while to the north is the Flores Sea and to the south is the Savu Sea.

== Administrative districts ==
Nagekeo Regency is divided into seven districts (kecamatan), tabulated below with their areas and their populations at the 2010 Census and the 2020 Census, together with the official estimates as of mid-2025. The table also includes the locations of the district administrative centres, the number of administrative villages in each district (totaling 97 rural desa and 16 urban kelurahan), and its postal codes.

Kode Wilayah	Name of District (kecamatan)	Area in km^{2}	Pop'n Census 2010	Pop'n Census 2020	Pop'n Estimate mid 2025	Admin centre	No. of villagwa	Post codes
53.06.04	Mauponggo	107.23	20,561	24,640	26,010	Mauponggo	21 ^{(a)}	86463
53.16.06	Keo Tengah	64.18	13,428	15,592	16,210	Maundai	16	86464
53.16.02	Nangaroro	243.28	17,172	21,634	23,396	Nangaroro	19 ^{(b)}	86465
53.16.03	Boawae	320.96	33,917	40,820	43,179	Boawae	27 ^{(c)}	86462
53.15.07	Aesesa Selatan (South Aesesa)	87.95	6,252	7,379	7,732	Jawakisa	7	86470
53.16.01	Aesesa ^{(d)}	416.76	33,901	43,684	47,762	Danga	18 ^{(e)}	86472
53.16.05	Wolowae ^{(f)}	157.72	4,889	5,983	6,380	Marilewa	5	86471
	Totals	1,398.08	130,120	159,732	170,669	Mbay	113	

Notes: (a) including the kelurahan of Wuliwalo. (b) including the kelurahan of Nangaroro.
(c) comprising 8 kelurahan (Nageoga, Nagesapadhi, Natanage, Natanage Timur, Olakile, Ratongamobo, Rega and Wolopogo) and 19 desa.
(d) including the offshore islands of Pulau Pasirita and Pulau Watundoa.
(e) comprising 6 kelurahan (Danga, Dhawe, Lape, Mbay I, Mbay II and Towak) and 12 desa. (f) including the offshore island of Pulau Kinde.

== Industries ==
=== Salt plant ===
In August 2011, Due to long dry season at the location, Australian saltmaker Cheetam Saltworks Ltd. is considering opening a plant in Nagekeo Regency with investment $15 million on a 1,500-hectare plot plus $6 million to build a port and would employ 1,600 people.

== Tourism ==
Besides pink beach in Komodo National Park area, Flores's other pink beach is in Rii Taa Island, Nagekeo Regency. The island is one hour by traditional fisherman boat from Maropokot small port. At high tide, the island area is only 30 square metres, but at low tide it becomes 20 hectares in area. Popular for local people, but only a few foreign tourists. No shade at all, good for sunbathing in the morning and afternoon.

== Notable people ==
- Fransisko Kota, Indonesian footballer
