= Kéo language =

Austronesian language spoken in Flores, Indonesia

Kéo
- Nage-Keo
- Native to: Indonesia
- Region: Central Flores
- Ethnicity: Nage, Kéo
- Native speakers: (100,000 cited 1993)
- Language family: Austronesian: Malayo-Polynesian; Central–Eastern MP; Sumba–Flores; Ende–Manggarai; Central Flores; Kéo

Language codes
- ISO 639-3: Either: xxk – Keʼo nxe – Nage
- Glottolog: nage1238

Kéo or Nagé-Kéo is a Malayo-Polynesian dialect cluster spoken by the Kéo (ʼata Kéo) and the Nage peoples that reside in an area southeast of the Ebulobo volcano in the south-central part of Nusa Tenggara Timur Province on the island of Flores, eastern Indonesia, largely in the eponymous Nagekeo Regency.

Kéo belongs to the Malayo-Polynesian, Central-Eastern Malayo-Polynesian, Bima-Lembata subgroups of the Austronesian language family and there are approximately 40,000 speakers.

Kéo is sometimes referred to as Nage-Kéo, Nage being the name of a neighboring ethnic group that is generally considered culturally distinct from Kéo; however, whether or not the two languages are separate entities is ambivalent.

Uncommon to Austronesian languages, Kéo is a highly isolating language that lacks inflectional morphology or clear morphological derivation. Instead it relies more heavily on lexical and syntactic grammatical processes.

== Sociolinguistic situation ==
Kéo (referred to locally as sara kita "our language" or sara ndai "the language here" as well as Bahasa Bajawa "the Bajawa language" in Indonesian) has distinct dialectal variation between villages. Kéo speakers are able to determine where someone is from based on pronunciation and word use.

Overall, the attitude towards Kéo by its speakers is unfavorable. It is considered more economically beneficial to speak Indonesian or English. Despite this sentiment, a sense of respect for the language remains through its oral traditions.

== Phonology ==
Ke'o vowel chart, from Baird (2002b:94)

=== Consonants ===
The Kéo spoken in the village of Udiworowatu (where the majority of data has been collected on the language) has a phonemic inventory of 23 consonants.

		Labial	Alveolar Apical	Palatal Laminal	Velar Dorsal	Glottal
Stop	voiceless	p	t	tʃ	k	ʔ
Stop	voiced	b	d	dʒ	g	
Stop	preglottalised	ˀb	ˀd			
Stop	prenasalised	ᵐb	ⁿd		ᵑɡ	
Nasal		m	n		ŋ	
Fricative		f	s		x	
Rhotic			r			
Lateral			l			
Approximant		w				

- There is a four-way stop distinction for manner of articulation: voiceless (unaspirated), voiced, preglottalised and prenasalised. This is atypical for an Austronesian language.
- Kéo does not have a contrastive distinction between bilabial and labio-dental; hence the term labial has been used for the place of articulation.

=== Vowels ===
Kéo has six vowel phonemes.

	Front	Central	Back
High	i		u
Mid	e	ə	o
Low		a	

== Morphology I ==
=== Pronouns ===
In Kéo there are seven standard pronoun forms that form a closed word class.

'Standard' Pronoun Form	Person and Number
nga'o	1st person singular
kau	2nd person singular
'imu	3rd person singular
kita	1st personal plural inclusive
kami	1st person plural exclusive
miu	2nd person plural
'imi-ko'o	3rd person plural

Kéo pronouns have the same form irrespective of their syntactic behaviour. They can function as independent pronouns, as subjects, objects or as possessors. There are also no grammatical gender distinctions.

In the examples below, the first-person singular pronoun nga'o is used across four different scenarios: as the subject of an intransitive verb (1), as the subject of a transitive verb (2), as an object, (3) and in the possessor slot of a possessive construction (4).

Examples:

Nga'o mbana.
1sg walk
I'm walking.

Nga'o bhobha 'imu.
1sg hit 3sg
I hit him.

Kepa kiki nga'o.
mosquito bit me
A mosquito bit me.

Dima nga'o lo.
arm 1sg hurt
My arm hurts.

=== Alternate pronoun forms ===
The alternate pronoun forms in Kéo are ja'o, miu, kita and sira. Their usage can depend on dialectal variants, politeness and taboo avoidance rules and specificity with quantity of people involved in the utterance.

==== ja'o ====
J'ao is an alternate pronoun for nga'o in the first person singular. In the past, the two terms were used as a dialect-identifying feature for the Kéo-speaking areas. Nowadays, both pronouns are used and personal preference appears to dictate usage. It has also been noted that a child will apply the term that is used by their mother.

In an example from a Kéo storyteller, both first-person pronoun forms are used stylistically to distinguish the main characters during a passage of direct speech, Wodo Bako nga'o and the sorcerer ja'o. This distinction can reflect the storyteller's partiality towards a character depending on which form they themselves identify with.

Examples:

Négha ké {Wodo Bako} simba si'I, "Ata podo kau kema wado 'ari nga'o."
already that {Wodo Bako} then say person sorcerer 2sg work return {younger sibling} 1st
'After that Wodo Bako then said, "Sorcerer you bring back my younger brother."'

'Ata podo si'I, "Modo ja'o kema wado"
person sorcerer say ok 1sg work {to return}
'The sorcerer said, "Ok I'll bring him back."'

==== miu ====
Miu as shown in the 'standard' pronoun form table above is used to address more than one person yet it can also be used to show a level of respect and politeness when speaking to someone.

Example:

'Iné miu ta ndia.
ma'am 2pl REL here.
'Ma'am, you stay here (while I go).'

==== kita ====
Kita is the pronoun used for first-person plural inclusive. In some cases kita is used to replace kami (first personal plural exclusive) when talking about belongings or possession. This switch in pronoun to include all addressees makes the speaker appear more community-minded and generous opposed to being arrogant or selfish.

Example:

kamba ko'o sai? Kamba kita.
buffalo POSS who buffalo 1PL.INCL
'Whose buffalo are these? Our water buffalo.'

==== sira ====
Sira is the archaic third-person pronoun plural form that can replace the standard second- and third-person pronouns kay and 'imi. Sira is used to avoid certain taboos in Kéo culture that include addressing parents-in-law or people held in high regard. Sira is also used when addressing a large group of people.

=== Pronoun + numeral ===
Kéo pronouns can be followed by numerals to indicate the exact number of referents. The pronoun-numeral sequence is the only time a number can be used without a classifier. The most common numeral used is rua 'two' (9) to create dual pronouns, yet it is also acceptable to use any other numeral (10).

Examples:

Mama né'e bapa ko'o Henri itu tungga kami rua weta nala.
mum and dad POSS Henri that only 1PL.EXCL two sister brother
'Me and Henri's dad, only us two were siblings.'

Rembu miu dima mbana.
All 2PL five go
'All five of you go.'

== Morphology II ==
=== Pronouns and person-marking ===
Personal pronouns replace proper nouns or other nouns, and form a closed word class. They are highly dependent on context, and are used to indicate if one is referring to the speaker, listener, etc. (Baird, 2002, pp. 108).

There are five subclasses of nouns; 1) common nouns, 2) kin terms, 3) place names, 4) personal names and 5) personal pronouns (Baird, 2002, pp. 101–102). Thus, unlike English, where pronouns are an independent part of the language, personal pronouns are included under the noun class in Kéo (Baird, 2002, pp. 97). Furthermore, all five of these subclasses, including personal pronouns, may be used as nominal predicates (Baird, 2002, pp. 101).

==== Personal pronouns ====
===== Standard forms =====
In Kéo, there is no change in the personal pronoun, even if they are independent pronouns, subjects, objects, possessors, etc. (Baird, 2002, pp. 108). However, first, second, third, (and singular and plural forms) have differences, and the first person plural pronoun has an inclusive and exclusive form. Apart from the first and second person singular pronoun, pronouns may be followed by numbers to quantify the pronoun. Gender is also not differentiated in Kéo pronouns (Baird, 2002, pp. 109).

Overview of Standard Personal Pronouns (Baird, 2002, pp. 110):
		singular	plural
1st	exclusive	nga'o	kami
1st	inclusive	nga'o	kita
2nd		kau	miu
3rd		'imu	'imu ko'o

- First person pronouns

The standard forms of first-person singular pronouns are nga'o; which is first-person singular, kita; first-person plural inclusive, and kami; first-person plural exclusive. This can be used to express I, me, my, etc. (Baird, 2002, pp. 110). For example:

Nga'o mbana.
1SG walk
'I'm walking.' (Baird, 2002, pp. 110)

Kepa kiki nga'o.
Mosquito bite 1SG
'A mosquito bit me.' (Baird, 2002, pp. 110)

- Second-person pronouns

The standard forms of second-person singular pronouns are kau; which is second-person singular and miu; second-person plural. This can be used to express you, your, etc. (Baird, 2002, pp. 110). For example:

Tuka kau bhu.
stomach 2SG bloated
'Your stomach is bloated.' (Baird, 2002, pp. 119).

- Third-person pronouns

The standard forms of third-person singular pronouns are 'imu; which is third-person singular and 'imu ko'o; third-person plural. This can be used as he, her, etc. (Baird, 2002, pp. 110). For example:

'Imu mbhana.
3SG go
'He went.' (Baird, 2002, pp. 116).

'Ana 'imu bhugé ré'é-ré'é
children 3SG fat very
'Her children are very fat.' (Baird, 2002, pp. 119).

A sentence can also be made to be less ambiguous by using 'imu possessively. (Baird, 2002, pp. 328). In other words, using a pronoun in this way can make the meaning of a sentence clearer to the listener:

Nambu wado Australia Peter ongga dhoa kumi,
When {go home} Australia Peter shave lose beard
'When Peter went home to Australia he shaved off a beard.'

Nambu wado Australia Peter ongga dhoa kumi 'imu.
When {go home} Australia Peter shave lose beard 3sg
'When Peter returned home to Australia he shaved off his beard.'

As seen in the examples (Baird, 2002, pp. 328) above, 2) clarifies the meaning of 1) with the addition of 'imu, as it shows the beard is Peter's beard.

Below is an example of both a first-person singular pronoun and a third-person singular pronoun being used in the same sentence:

Nga'o bhobha 'imu.
1sg hit 3sg
'I hit him.' (Baird, 2002, pp. 110).

===== Alternate forms =====
There are also alternate forms of personal pronouns, which are used for different reasons. There are three main reasons as to why alternate pronouns are used. Firstly, alternate pronouns may be used to indicate politeness, or to avoid social taboo. Secondly, they may be used based on dialect variations. Lastly, certain pronouns are used to identify the exact number of people there are in the situation being described or talked about (Baird, 2002, pp. 111). Baird (2002) highlighted four alternate forms of personal pronouns used in Kéo; ja'o, miu, kita, and sira (Baird, 2002, pp. 111–114).

The first alternate form, ja'o, is an alternate form of the first-person singular pronoun, nga'o (standard form). Initially, each dialect group used either one exclusively, and was a way to identify which Kéo -speaking area one was from. However, the use of the standard and alternate form of the pronoun no longer has this ability to establish one's dialect group (Baird, 2002, pp. 111). This will be further discussed below in Regional Varieties.

The second alternate form is miu. It is often used in reference to more than one person, but can also be used to address one person as an honorific. (Baird, 2002, pp. 112). For example:

'Iné miu ta ndia.
ma'am 2.pl REL here
'Ma'am, you stay here (while I go).' (Baird, 2002, pp. 112).

The third alternate form is kita (Baird, 2002, pp. 113). As mentioned above, first-person plural pronouns have an exclusive and inclusive form in Kéo (Baird, 2002, pp. 110). However, the alternate and inclusive form, kita, frequently replaces kami (the exclusive form). Using the inclusive form (kita) instead of the exclusive form (kami) helps the speaker to seem more generous and selfless, as they are including the listener in their speech. Especially when discussing property and personal possessions, the speaker can sound less arrogant by using the inclusive term instead of the exclusive term. (Baird, 2002, pp. 113). For example:

Kamba ko'o sai? Kaba kita.
Bufffalo POSS who buffalo 1PL.INCL
'Whose water buffalo are these? Our water buffalo.' (Baird, 2002, pp. 113).

Another example which shows the importance of inclusivity in Kéo is where Kéo is often referred to as 'our language' (sara kita) instead of just Kéo. (Baird, 2002, pp. 9).

The last alternate form of personal pronouns highlighted by Baird (2002) is sira. This pronoun may be used instead of second- and third-person pronouns. The main reason sira is used is as an honorific. It is often used to greet people, and to refer to in-laws or others as a sign of respect. Thus, one would use sira instead of 'imu-ko'o (Baird, 2002, pp. 114). Kin terms, which is what identifies the relationship between speakers (Baird, 2002, pp. 105), are also preferred when addressing in-laws, to establish a close relationship. Thus, sira would be used more often than more polite pronouns such as miu (Baird, 2002, pp. 113–114).

- Regional varieties

Pronouns help to differentiate dialects. In the past, the difference in the first person singular pronoun ja'o and nga'o helped to establish this difference. However, in present times intermarriages between different dialect groups have dissolved these boundaries. Instead, which first person singular pronoun is used is up to personal preference (Baird, 2002, pp. 28). Apart from personal preference, many Kéo speakers have the tendency to follow the form that their mother uses, (Baird, 2002, pp. 111) while some adopt the form that their in-laws use after marriage (Baird, 2002, pp. 112).

== Syntax ==
=== Possession ===
==== Adnominal possession ====
There are two types:

1. possessive particle is used to link noun phrases. (Eg. 'Aé ko'o kami (water-POSS-1st plural exclusive) ('our water'))
2. possessor can either be a noun phrase or a pronoun. (Eg. Bapa kami (father-1st plural exclusive) ('our father'))

=== Negation ===
There are two negators in Kéo, mona and nggedhé. These negators are synonymous. Negators can precede the predicate, be predicates themselves, and be interjections.

== Bibliography ==
- Baird, Louise (2002a). A Grammar of Kéo: An Austronesian Language of East Nusantara (Ph.D.). Canberra: Department of Linguistics, The Research School of Pacific and Asian Studies at The Australian National University. hdl:1885/9446.
- Baird, Louise (2002b). "Kéo". Journal of the International Phonetic Association. 32 (1): 93–97. doi:10.1017/S0025100302000178.
