= Ethnozoology =

Study of human and animal interaction

Ethnozoology is a field of study that explores the complex relationships between humans and animals in their environment. This discipline encompasses the classification and naming of various animal species, as well as the cultural knowledge and use of both wild and domesticated animals. Ethnozoology is a subdiscipline of ethnobiology, which also includes ethnobotany, the study of human-plant relationships. However, unlike ethnobotany, ethnozoology focuses specifically on human-animal relationships and the knowledge that humans have acquired about the animals in their surroundings.

The study of ethnozoology sheds light on the roles that animals have played in human societies throughout history, from their utilitarian functions to their cultural, religious, artistic, and philosophical significance. Ethnozoology can be approached from various perspectives, such as ecological, cognitive, and symbolic, and it connects scientific methods to traditional systems of knowledge and cultural beliefs.

== Conservation ==
In a broader context, ethnozoology and its companion discipline, ethnobotany, contribute to the larger science of ethnobiology. The history of ethnobiology is divided into three periods. The pre-classical period, which began around 1860, focused on collecting information about humans' use of resources, while the classical period, which began in 1954, produced anthropological studies on linguistics and biological classifications. The current period, or post-classical period, has been described as a meeting of social science and the study of natural resources.

Given the profound human influence on faunal biodiversity, wildlife conservation planning is becoming increasingly urgent. It is widely acknowledged that environmental health is important to human health, and biodiversity loss can have both indirect and direct negative effects on human wellbeing. The close link between human health and ecological/faunal health is substantiated with five important concepts: animals cause and disseminate disease for humans and vice versa, animals can be guards of human health, animals are used in traditional medicine practices throughout the world, animals are a source of drugs and treatments in human diseases, and animals are used in medical research.

== The social sciences ==
=== Sociology ===
Sociology has been slow to explore ethnozoology and grant it credibility. The study of ethnozoology is important because policy makers and concerned citizens are too often left to be informed only by animal advocates or biomedical researchers, both of which are inherently biased. Animals provide humans with a better understanding of ourselves, and how we think and act toward animals has the potential to reveal our attitudes toward other people and social order. Evidence of this can be seen in the ways that animal images may at times be expressing underlying racism: "the most damning testimony given by accused police at the Rodney King trial involved characterization of King as a 'gorilla'; during the Persian Gulf War Saddam Hussein was described in the American press as a 'rat'; and the actions of people in the Los Angeles riots were likened by the media commentators to 'packs of vicious animals'".

Sociology is a science concerned with groups and group formation, including those facing structural and interpersonal oppression, suffering, and vulnerability. Sub-fields in this area include African Americans studies, women's studies, and gay/lesbian studies. However, not much attention or legitimacy is awarded animal studies as a sub-field. Modern use of animals in the developed world, especially in the United States, can be characterized by exploitation, domination, and oppression. Animal cruelty and abuse is not only present in the industrial farming of livestock, but also in such circumstances as dog fighting, cow tipping, horse racing, circus acts, and other entertainment industries and practices. Furthermore, animals are often victims and pawns used in domestic violence. The widespread abuse of animals in modern society is important for sociology because it involves an entrenched assumption about the connection between cruelty toward animals and violence directed and human beings. Some research has even suggested ways in which the human-animal interaction can challenge dominant sociological theories about the self.

=== Anthropology ===
Anthropology has done more to study ethnozoology in terms of the history of the function of animals in non-industrialized societies and the role that animals play symbolically and religiously in different cultures around the world. The domestication process has been a chief concern for anthropologists, whose interests are in the history of human desire to understand animals, enslave them, and harness their power. Animal-derived products have been used especially for food, but also for clothing, tools, toys, and for medicinal and magic-religious purposes. Many cultures associate strong supernatural powers between the animal and human worlds, including mythologies and connections with totemic, ancestral, or magical animals and animal-gods.

Animals are given symbolic meaning, as in the western association of black cats with poor luck. Biological knowledge varies according to cultural and traditional knowledge and experiences. People share a basic way of comprehending the natural world based on common evolutionary history, and this foundation connects scientific biology with its historical roots in different cultures. The evolutionary perspective on human cognition and affect indicates some degree of universality in perception and decision-making with regard to the natural world and its fauna. The interaction between these aspects of psychology, biodiversity of the Earth's wildlife, and the unique social, cultural, and economic contexts within which humans interact and develop produces cultural diversity. Paleoanthropological studies suggest that linguistic approaches to ethnobiology have only recently evolved in the context of human history, which suggests that these linguistic approaches only provide a partial understanding to how humans perceive and engage with the natural world around them.

== See also ==
- Anthrozoology
