= Flores =

Island of the Lesser Sunda Islands in Indonesia

Native name: Pulau Flores Nickname: Tanjung Bunga, Pulau Bunga
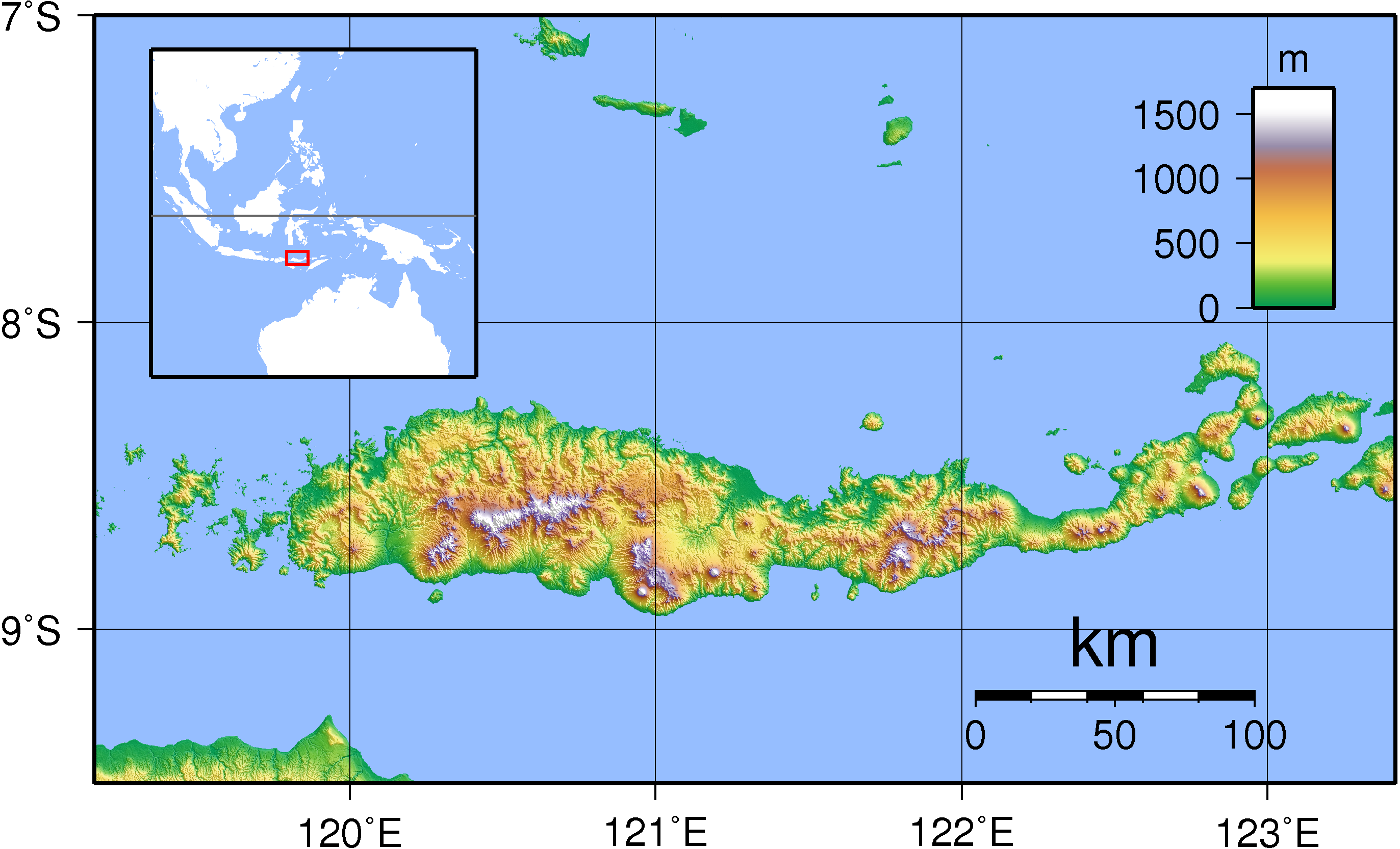
- Topography of Flores

- Location of Flores
- Etymology: Portuguese Cabo de Flores, 'cape of flowers', a name for the eastern part of the island due to its Delonix regia trees; later 'Flores' was applied to the entire island

Geography
- Location: Southeast Asia
- Coordinates: 8°40′29″S 121°23′04″E
- Archipelago: Lesser Sunda Islands
- Area: 14,250 km^{2} (5,500 sq mi)
- Area rank: 60th
- Length: 354 km (220 mi)
- Width: 66 km (41 mi)
- Highest elevation: 2,370 m (7780 ft)
- Highest point: Poco Mandasawu

Administration
- Indonesia
- Province: East Nusa Tenggara
- Regencies: East Flores; Ende; Manggarai; East Manggarai; West Manggarai; Nagekeo; Ngada; Sikka
- Largest settlement: Maumere (pop. 89,519)

Demographics
- Population: 2,014,110 (mid 2024)
- Population rank: 39th
- Pop. density: 146.4/km^{2} (379.2/sq mi)
- Languages: Indonesian; Kupang Malay; Sikka; Lamaholot; Western Flores languages; Hokkien; English; Indonesian Sign
- Ethnic groups: Manggarai; Ngada; Sikka; Helong; Keo; Rampasasa; Nage; Chinese

Additional information
- Time zone: Central Indonesia Time (UTC+8)

Flores (/flɔːrɛs/ FLOR-ess) is one of the Lesser Sunda Islands, a group of islands in the eastern half of Indonesia. Administratively, it forms the largest island in the East Nusa Tenggara Province. The area is 14,250 km^{2} (5,500 sq mi), similar to Shikoku or Jamaica. Including Komodo and Rinca islands off its west coast (but excluding the Solor Archipelago to the east of Flores), the population was 1,878,875 in the 2020 Census (including various offshore islands); the official estimate as of mid-2024 was 2,014,110. The largest towns are Ende and Maumere. The name Flores is of Portuguese origin, meaning "Flowers".

Flores is located east of Sumbawa and the Komodo Islands, and west of the Solor Islands and the Alor Archipelago. To the southeast is Timor. To the south, across the Sumba Strait, is Sumba Island, and to the north, beyond the Flores Sea, is Sulawesi.

Among all islands containing Indonesian territory, Flores is the 10th most populous after Java, Sumatra, Borneo (Kalimantan), Sulawesi, New Guinea, Bali, Madura, Lombok, and Timor, and also the 10th biggest island of Indonesia. Flores is among the 40 most populous islands in the world, with a population similar to Manhattan or Xiamen (Amoy).

Until the arrival of modern humans, Flores was inhabited by Homo floresiensis, a small archaic human.

== Etymology ==
Unlike most islands in the Indonesian archipelago, the modern name Flores was given by the Portuguese. According to Sareng Orin Bao (1969), the oral tradition of the Sikka region gave the island the original name of Nusa Nipa, (Note: Maasin, one of the oldest towns in Southern Leyte (Philippines), was also called Nipa.) meaning 'Dragon island' or Snake island. (Nipa nai means "ascending snakes"; kaju nipa nai is the name of an unidentified tree with a bark resembling snake skin, but it can also mean "driftwood", or any sort of wood washed up in a flood.) Forth says that "'Nusa Nipa' is a designation which at present is widely accepted on Flores as the indigenous name for the entire island. Despite the argument of Sareng Orin Bao (1969) who adduces a variety of evidence favoring this interpretation, it remains uncertain whether this was in a fact a traditional usage, or at any rate one that was known throughout Flores". The names Tandjoeng Bunga or Tanjung Bunga and Pulau Bunga are also mentioned.

The eastern part of the island, originally called Kopondai, was called Cabo de Flores (Cape of Flowers) by the Portuguese because of the flowering flamboyant trees (Delonix regia) found there. That name remained.

== History ==
=== Prehistory ===
Before the arrival of modern humans, Flores was occupied by Homo floresiensis, a small archaic human. The ancestors of Homo floresiensis arrived on the island between 1.3 and 1 million years ago.

As of 2015, partial remains of fifteen individuals have been found by a joint Australian-Indonesian research team, headed by Mike Morwood and Thomas Sutikna, and the dominant consensus is that these remains do represent a distinct species due to anatomical differences from modern humans. The most recent evidence shows that Homo floresiensis likely became extinct 50,000 years ago, around the time of modern human arrival to the archipelago.

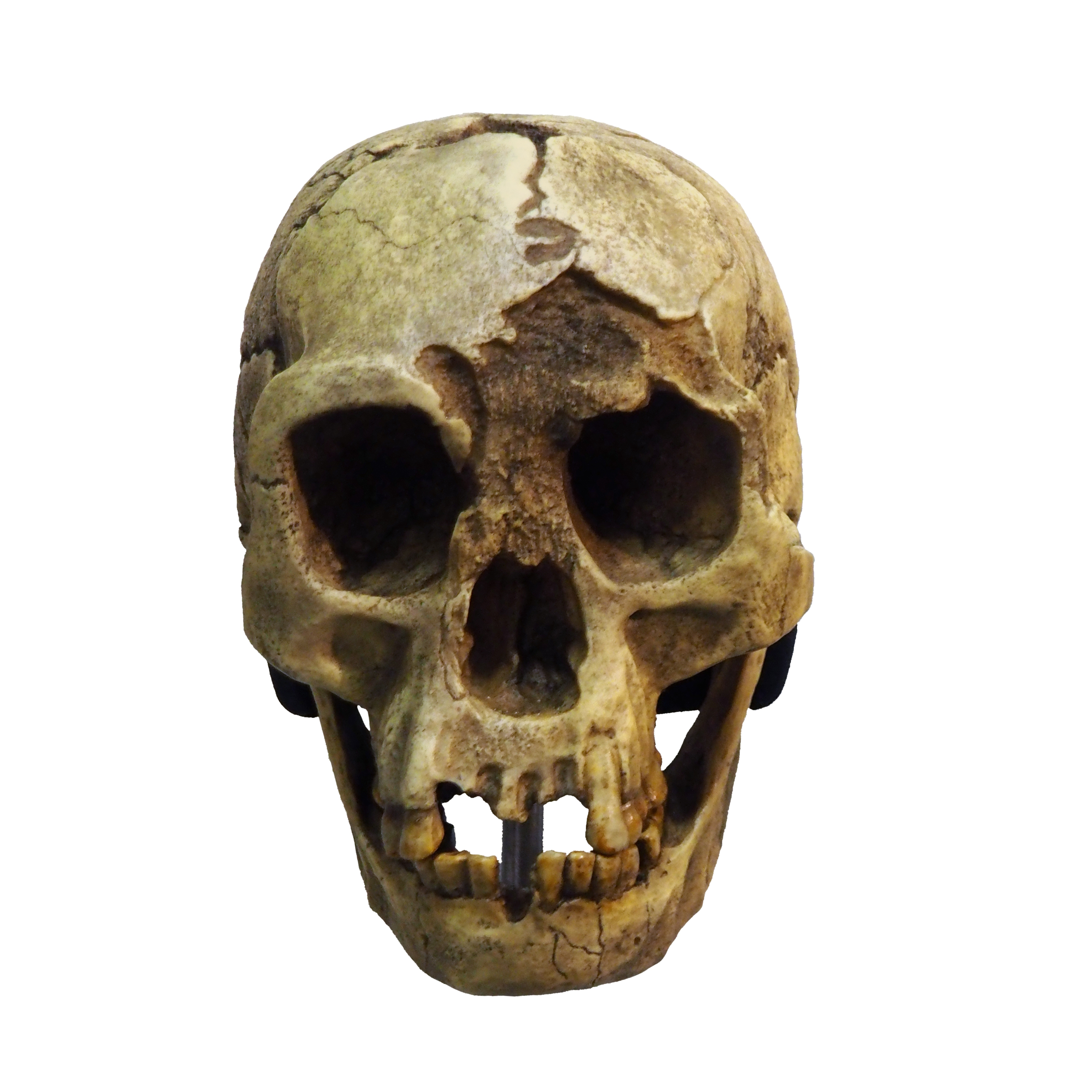
H. floresiensis skull, Cantonal Museum of Geology, Switzerland

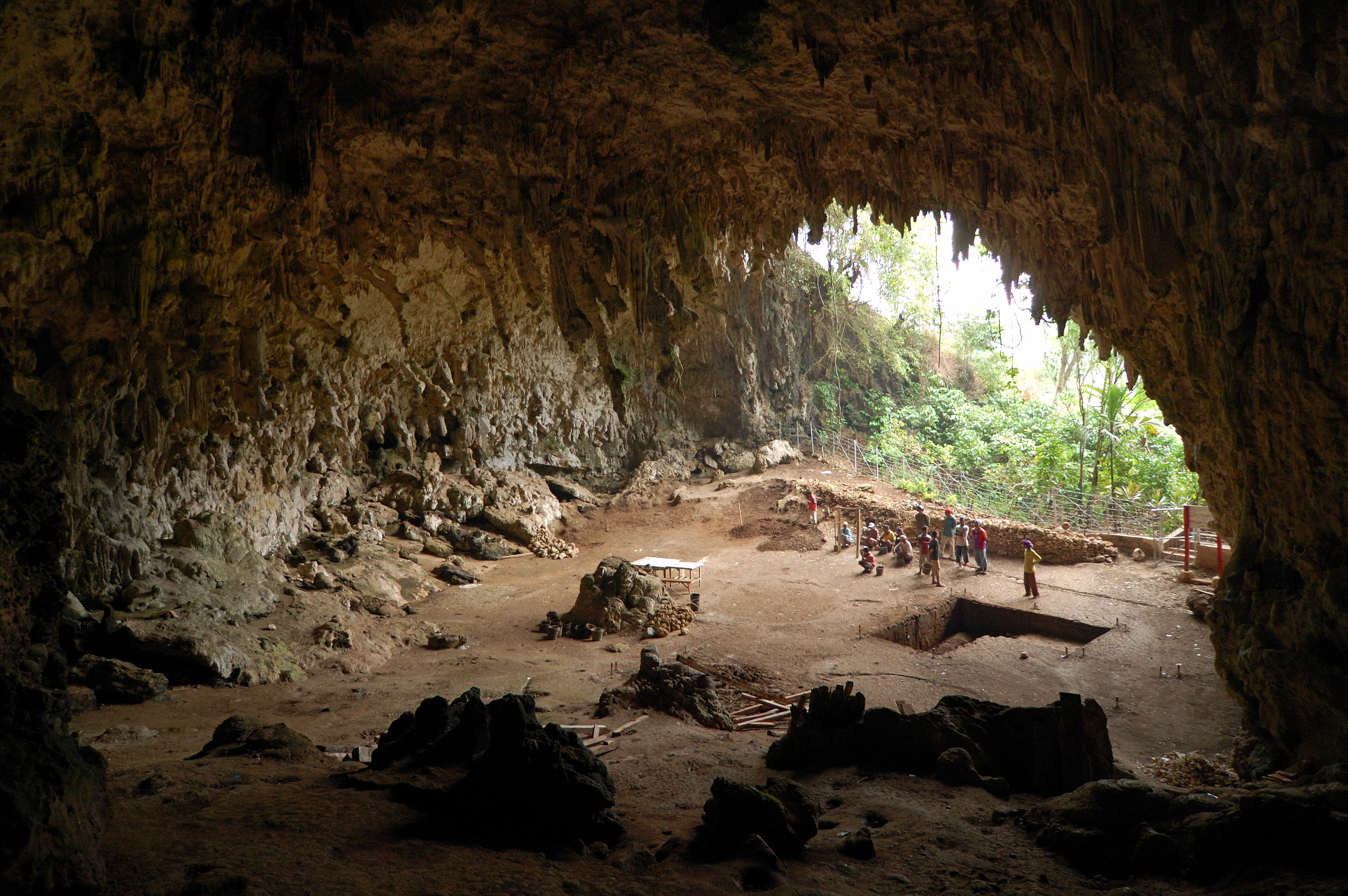
Liang Bua Cave, where the specimens were discovered

=== Modern history ===
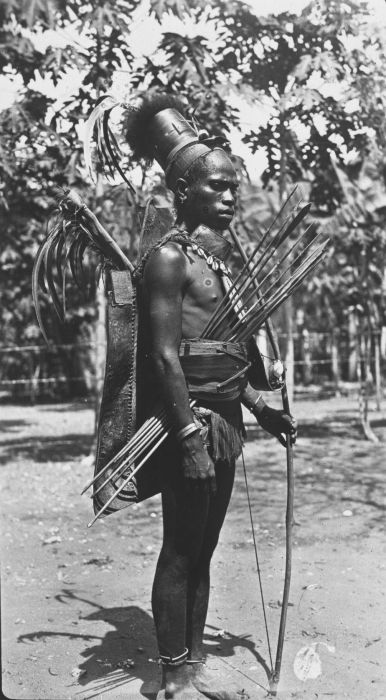
Indigenous warrior from Ende, Flores, before 1938.

Flores was most likely first inhabited by Melanesians at least since 30,000 BC.

Portuguese traders and missionaries came to Flores in the 16th century, mainly to Larantuka and Sikka. Their influence is still discernible in Sikka's language, culture, and religion. The first Portuguese visit took place in 1511, through the expedition of António de Abreu and his vice-captain Francisco Serrão, en route through the Sunda islands.

The Dominican order played an important role on this island, as well as on the neighbouring islands of Timor and Solor. When the Dutch attacked the fortress of Solor in 1613, the population of the fort, led by the Dominicans, moved to the harbor town of Larantuka on the eastern coast of Flores. This population was mixed, of Portuguese and local islander descent and Larantuqueiros, Topasses, or, as the Dutch knew them, the 'Black Portuguese' (Zwarte Portugezen).

The Larantuqueiros, also known as Topasses, became the dominant sandalwood trading people of the region for the next 200 years. This group was observed by William Dampier, an English privateer visiting the Island in 1699:

These [the Topasses] have no Forts, but depend on their Alliance with the Natives: And indeed they are already so mixt, that it is hard to distinguish whether they are Portuguese or Indians. Their Language is Portuguese; and the religion they have, is Romish. They seem in Words to acknowledge the King of Portugal for their Sovereign yet they will not accept any Officers sent by him. They speak indifferently the Malayan and their native Languages, as well as Portuguese.

In the western part of Flores, the Manggarai came under the control of the Sultanate of Bima, in eastern Sumbawa. The Dutch effectively established their administration over western Flores in 1907. In 1929, the Bimanese sultanate ceded any control over Manggarai.

In 1846, the Dutch and Portuguese initiated negotiations to delimit their territories, but these negotiations led nowhere. In 1851, Lima Lopes, the new governor of Timor, Solor, and Flores, agreed to sell eastern Flores and the nearby islands to the Dutch in return for a payment of 200,000 Florins to support his impoverished administration. Lima Lopes did so without the consent of Lisbon and was dismissed in disgrace; however, his agreement was not rescinded. In 1854, Portugal ceded all its historical claims on Flores. After this, Flores became part of the territory of the Dutch East Indies.

During World War II, Great Britain, the Netherlands East Indies, and the United States imposed on Japan an embargo on rubber and oil and froze Japan's overseas funds. This was a strong incentive for Japan to get hold of the prosperous colonies of South East Asia, and its Operation "S" targeted the Lesser Sunda Islands – including Flores. On 14 May 1942, Labuan Bajo was the theatre of an amphibious landing by the Japanese Army landing force, and a Japanese Navy Special Naval Landing Force (SNLF) landed at Reo. Japan occupied Flores until the end of the Pacific War. During that time, the Japanese administration and forces saw Christians as suspected Dutch sympathizers. They were exceedingly heavy-handed towards them in general, but not so much on Flores, where Christians were treated notably less harshly than in the neighbouring islands of Timor and Sumba. Remarkably, in Flores, the European priests and nuns were neither interned nor evicted throughout the occupation. According to Paul Webb (1986), this is because Florenese Christians were "too many to ignore": nearly half the population of Flores was Catholic and the Japanese, who could not afford to increase the size of their small occupation forces on the island, allowed European priests and sisters to stay at their posts rather than risking a general rebellion. (Note: Webb recalls the Shimabara rebellion that took place near Nagasaki in 1637 and 1638, when 40,000 Catholics entrenched themselves into an old castle on the Shimabara peninsula and held out against 120,000 Japanese soldiers for about four months; they were all put to death after they had surrendered. According to Webb, the Japanese did not want a historical repeat of it. Nevertheless, this did not stop them from establishing military brothels staffed with hundreds of kidnapped young Indonesian women for their troops on the island, and treating the rest of the population and the prisoners of war as badly as they did elsewhere. See International Military Tribunal for the Far East.)

After the war, Flores became part of independent Indonesia.

On 12 December 1992, an earthquake measuring 7.8 on the Richter scale killed 2,500 people in and around Maumere, including islands off the north coast.

In 2017, two men were killed in Flores due to land disputes between warrior clans; the Mbehel, a West Manggarai mountain tribe, and the Rangko from Sulawesi island, who helped build Manggarai and were given land near Labuan Bajo by the Manggarai king.

On 15 August 2026, an earthquake measuring 7.7 on the Richter scale struck off the coast of Flores, killing at least 53 people and injured 135 others while generating tsunamis of 1.61 meters (5 ft. 3 in.) in height.

== Administration ==
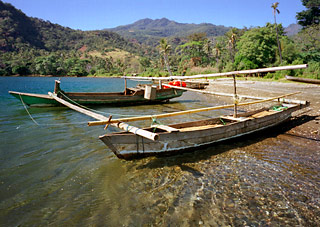
Some fishing boats on Flores

Flores is part of the East Nusa Tenggara province. The island along with smaller minor islands is split into eight regencies (local government divisions); from west to east these are Manggarai Barat (West Manggarai), Manggarai (Central Manggarai), Manggarai Timur (East Manggarai), Ngada, Nagekeo, Ende, Sikka and part of Flores Timur (East Flores). Flores has 35.24% of the East Nusa Tenggara provincial population as of 2023, and is the largest of all islands in the province, with the second-largest population (Timor has slightly more people).

The eight regencies are listed below from east to west, with their areas and their populations at the 2010 Census and the 2020 Census, together with the official estimates as of mid-2024.

Kode Wilayah	Name of City or Regency	Statute (including year when established)	Area in km^{2}	Pop'n 2010 Census	Pop'n 2020 Census	Pop'n mid 2024 Estimate	Capital	HDI 2022 estimate
53.06	East Flores Regency (Flores Timur) (part of) ^{(a)}	UU 69/1958	1,056.49	101,060	116,398	121,388	Larantuka	0.6493 (Medium)
53.07	Sikka Regency	UU 69/1958	1,675.36	300,328	321,953	346,614	Maumere	0.6606 (Medium)
53.08	Ende Regency	UU 69/1958	2,085.19	260,605	270,763	281,371	Ende	0.6797 (Medium)
53.16	Nagekeo Regency	UU 2/2007	1,398.08	130,120	159,732	168,355	Mbay	0.6622 (Medium)
53.09	Ngada Regency	UU 69/1958	1,736.83	142,393	165,254	174,088	Bajawa	0.6826 (Medium)
53.19	East Manggarai Regency (Manggarai Timur)	UU 36/2007	2,391.45	252,744	275,603	296,174	Borong	0.623 (Medium)
53.10	Manggarai Regency (Manggarai Tengah)	UU 69/1958	1,343.83	292,451	312,855	349,836	Ruteng	0.6583 (Medium)
53.15	West Manggarai Regency ^{(b)} (Manggarai Barat)	UU 8/2003	3,129.00	221,703	256,317	276,284	Labuan Bajo	0.6492 (Medium)
	Totals		13,759.74	1,701,404	1,878,875	2,014,110		

Notes

- (a) only the eight districts of this regency situated on Flores Island are included in these figures; the three districts comprising Solor Island and the eight districts on Adonara Island are excluded.
- (b) West Manggarai Regency includes Komodo and Rinca islands off the west coast of Flores; these islands are part of a National Park and thus poorly inhabited.

The main towns on Flores are Maumere, Ende, Ruteng, Larantuka, and Bajawa, listed with their populations as of mid-2023.

- Ende: 87,723 inhabitants (sum of populations of four districts)
- Maumere: 77,909 inhabitants (excluding populations on offshore islands)
- Ruteng: 65,694 inhabitants
- Larantuka: 41,642 inhabitants
- Bajawa: 40,259 inhabitants

== Flora and fauna ==
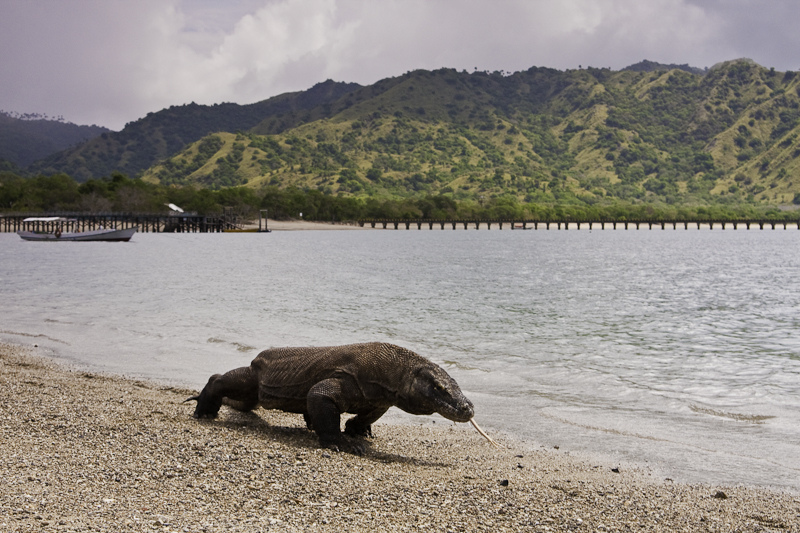
Komodo National Park

The Komodo dragon is endemic to Flores and surrounding islands and has been continuously present on Flores for at least 1.4 million years. Today, it is confined to a handful of small areas on Flores itself. Varanus hooijeri is a smaller extinct species of monitor lizard which occurred on Flores into the Holocene.

The endemic fauna of Flores includes some rats (Murinae), some of which are now extinct, ranging from small-sized forms such as Rattus hainaldi, Paulamys, and the Polynesian rat (which possibly originated on the island), medium-sized such as Komodomys, and Hooijeromys, and giants such as Spelaeomys and Papagomys, the largest species of which, the still-living Papagomys armandvillei (Flores giant rat) is approximately the size of a rabbit, with a weight of up to 2.5 kilograms (5.5 lb).

Flores was also the habitat of several extinct dwarf forms of the proboscidean (elephant relative) Stegodon, the most recent (Stegodon florensis insularis) of which disappeared approximately 50,000 years ago. The island before modern human arrival was also inhabited by the giant stork Leptoptilos robustus and the vulture Trigonoceps.

== Seismology ==
Flores Island is bounded by active tectonic regions, with the Sunda Trench to the south and the Flores back-arc thrust fault to the north. As a result, the island experiences many earthquakes each year and, on occasion, tsunamis. The largest recorded earthquake in the region was the 1992 Flores earthquake and tsunami, a magnitude 7.8 event that caused Severe shaking on the Mercalli intensity scale. The Flores back-arc thrust is of particular interest to researchers as it is believed to accommodate the transition between the Sunda Trench in the west and the subduction of the Australian plate in the east. The Flores Thrust is approximately 450 km long and consists of a deep-rooted basal fault and many overlying imbricate thrust faults. The system is highly active, with more than 25 earthquakes of a magnitude 6 or above since 1960. In 2018, a large sequence of earthquakes (such as on the 5th of August and in July) in Lombok ruptured sections of the Flores Thrust. The dip of the main thrust fault of approximately 2–3° compared to the 3–4° dip of the subducting plate on the Sunda Trench leads some to believe that the fault could someday be the site of a subduction polarity reversal and begin subducting.

A volcanic eruption in southeast Flores triggered earthquakes that killed at least 10 people as of 4 November 2024. Authorities warned of the possibility of more earthquakes in the coming days.

== Society and culture ==
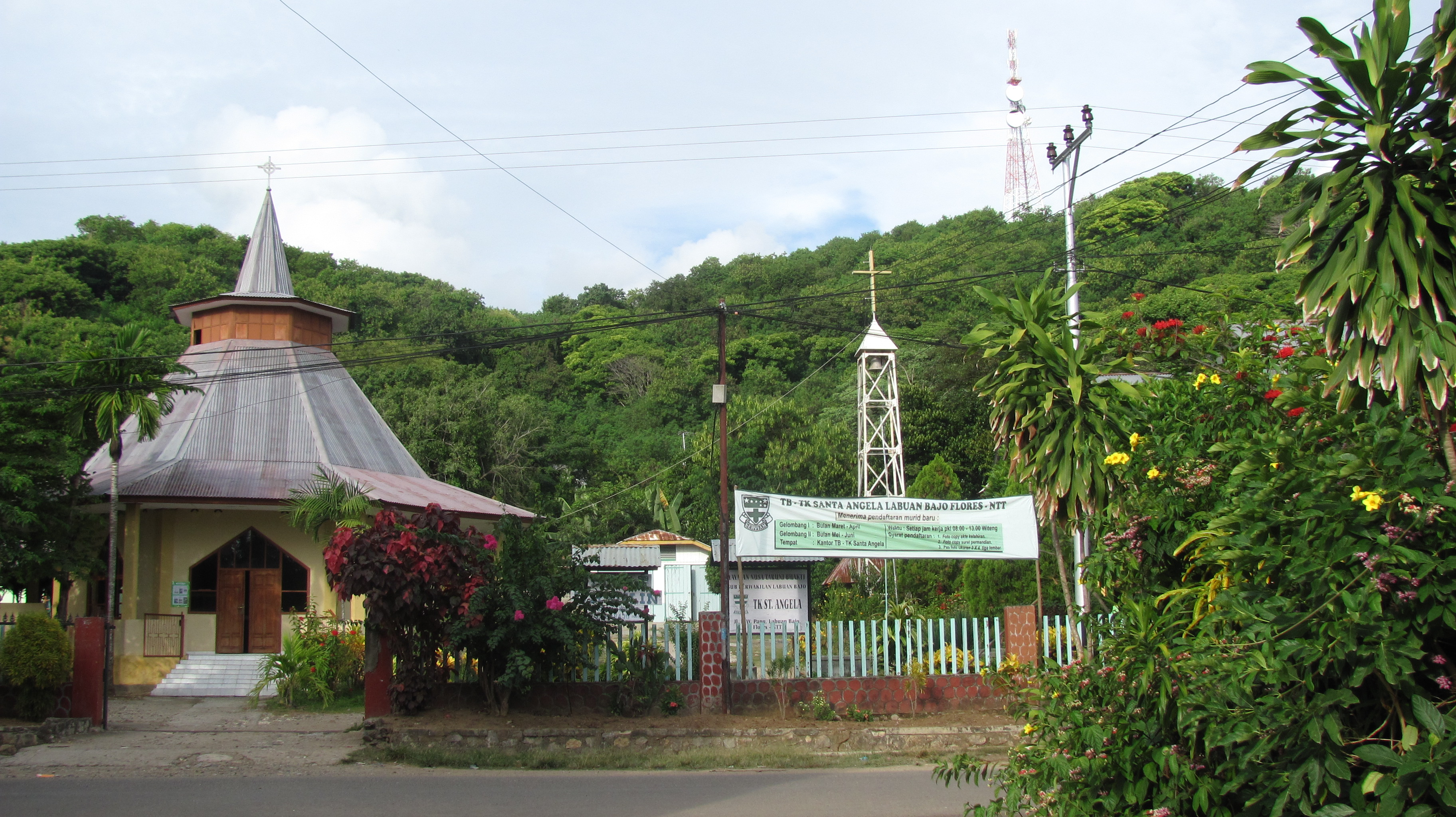
Saint Angela Church in Labuan Bajo

=== Languages ===
Many languages are spoken on the island of Flores, all of them belonging to the Austronesian family. In the west, Manggarai is spoken; Riung, often classified as a dialect of Manggarai, is spoken in the north-central part of the island. In the centre of the island in the regencies of Ngada, Nagekeo, and Ende, there is what is variously called the Central Flores dialect chain or linkage. Within this area, there are slight linguistic differences in almost every village. At least six separate languages are identifiable: from west to east, Ngadha, Nage, Keo, Ende, Lio, and Palu'e (which is spoken on the island with the same name off the north coast of Flores). Locals would probably also add So'a and Bajawa to this list, which anthropologists have labeled dialects of Ngadha. To the east, Sikka and Lamaholot can be found.

Djawanai (1983) precises that Ngadha somewhat deviates from Austronesian norms, in that words do not have clear cognates and the grammatical processes are different; for example, the Austronesian family of languages makes an abundant use of prefixes or suffixes (which form new words by adding extensions either before or after root-words, such as [per-]form or child[-hood]), whereas the Ngadha and Keo languages use no prefixes or suffixes.

=== Social organisation ===
The traditional social structure is based on complex extended family ties, where patrilineal and matrilineal lineages coexist and determine a strict social hierarchy within villages. It is similar to that in Lembata, East Nusa Tenggara; and is reflected in the spiderweb disposition of the rice fields around Cancar (16 km west of Ruteng): started as a pie centered on the point where buffaloes are sacrificed, the allotments originally shaped as pie slices were later divided transversally by the heirs.

=== Religion ===
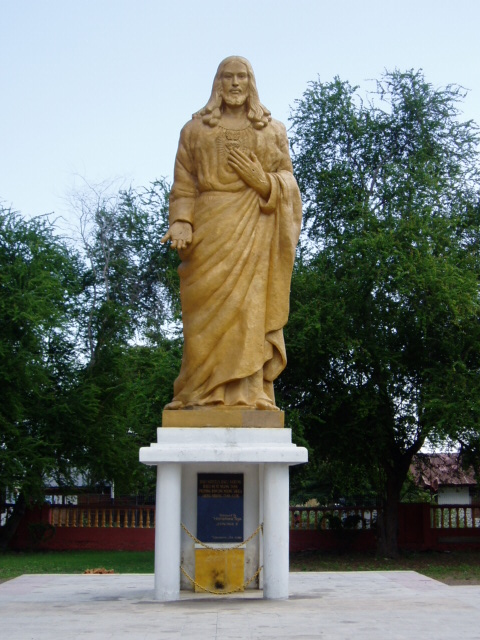
Jesus statue in Maumere

Religion in Flores (2023)
1. Roman Catholic (83.6%)
2. Protestantism (1.17%)
3. Islam (15.2%)
4. Hinduism (0.05%)
5. Buddhism (0.01%)
6. Others (0.00%)

The native peoples of Flores are mostly Roman Catholic Christians, whereas most other Indonesians are Muslim. As a consequence, Flores may be regarded as surrounded by a religious border. The prominence of Catholicism on the island resulted from its colonisation by Portugal in the east and early 20th-century support by the Dutch in the west. In other parts of Indonesia with significant Christian populations, such as the Maluku Islands and Sulawesi, the geographical divide is less rigid and Muslims and Christians sometimes live side by side. Flores thereby also has less religious violence than that which has sporadically occurred in other parts of Indonesia. There are several churches on the island. On 26 May 2019, Flores's St. Paul Catholic University of Indonesia was formally inaugurated by Indonesian Education Minister Mohamad Nasir, becoming the first Catholic university in Flores. Aside from Catholicism, Islam also has a presence on the island, especially in some coastal communities.

=== Totemism ===
Totemism is present, although anthropologists like Lévi-Strauss and historians like Robert Jones have eschewed the term "totemism" as an imprecise and artificial category of cultural phenomena. Forth (2009a), focusing on the Nage people of central Flores, argues that totemism manifests itself as a tendency to link people and plants, not as a totalizing form of analogical classification as described by Lévi-Strauss. He notes that many clans (woe) in Flores are named after various trees and that these trees have become taboo (pie), such that they must not be burnt or used as fuel (pie 'uge). The Nage people bear the name of the tamarind tree, Tamarindus indica, and thus avoid burning its wood.

A few clans are not named after plants, but also have taboos on particular trees. For example, the Wa or Ana Wa people, whose name means "wind" or "wind people, children", (Note: "Ana wa" is also the word for "animal", but this is not related to the clan's name.) claim the nage or tamarind tree as taboo; the Dhuge people bear the name of a former village and taboo the zita tree (Alstonia scholaris); so do the Saga 'Enge people, whose name origin is not known. (Note: Some tribe names are related to particular traditions and beliefs, for example the Sodha or Naka Sodha people: sodha is "a kind of song, singing", and naka is "to steal"; this refers to a ritual task whereby a designated man should "steal" a portion of cooked meat and rice before it is served at feasts, an act thought to ensure that the supply will be sufficient.)

The Nage people have plant totems but no animal totems—and, therefore, no taboo on killing and eating any animal. In contrast, their neighbours to the west, the Ngadha people, have 14 animal taboos and 16 plant taboos.

=== Textiles ===
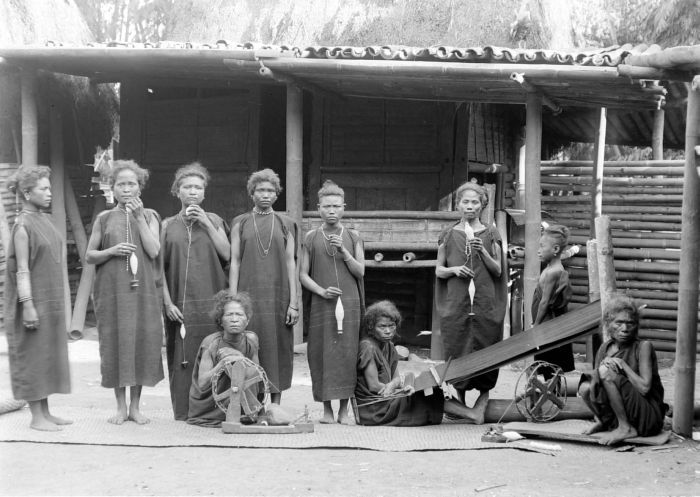
Ngada women with spinning rods, loom and spinning wheel.

Weaving on Flores utilizes cotton grown in the low-lying areas of the island. Each ethnic group on Flores has its own tradition of dyeing, weaving, and trading in textiles.

==== Dyes ====
The dyes used are essentially indigo, turmeric (Note: Turmeric: wuné in Ngadha language.) and morinda. Lamaholot people use maize starch to size the yarn before dying.

Blue (indigo)

Indigofera tinctoria grows in the temperate zones at middle elevations; It is the most commonly used plant base for indigo blue and black dyes. Bar a few exceptions, it is always used in ikat.

Red (morinda and others)

Morinda citrifolia (mengkudu, keloré in Lamalera), extensively used in the archipelago as a source of red dye, does not grow well on Flores and, according to Hoopen, is scarcely used here. But its use is reported in N'Dona (just east of Ende), where it is mixed with various mordants including candlenut (kemiri, very oily nut). Barnes also reports its use in the villages of Ili Mandiri, East Flores – and describes at length the arduous process for its preparation and application. Close by, weavers from the village of Larantuka may use the tree called gemoli for red dye.

Powdered leaves of a plant (tree?) called "lobah" are used in N'Dona (east of Ende) to obtain bright reds.

Yellow (turmeric, mango, and others)

Yellow translates as kuma. In the Sikka area, turmeric was used for producing yellow monochrome warp stripes, as well as orange or green stripes by overdyeing with either morinda or indigo; sometimes, mango bark was used for that purpose.

At Doka in the 'Iwang Geté or Krowé (Note: Iwangeté or Iwang Geté is a small region in Sikka regency that encompasses the villages of Watublapi (Hewokloang district), Héwokloang, Kloangpopot (Doreng district), Hale (Mapitara district), Hebingare, and Doka (Bola district). Krowe is another name for this area, although neither name is quite accurate.) region, a more durable deep mustard yellow is produced from turmeric, mango bark, Morinda citrifolia (mengkudu) tree bark (not root), jackfruit bark and powdered lime (kapur sireh). Dyers of that region also mix turmeric with mango bark. (Note: Textiles from Palu'é island have narrow yellow-orange warp stripes dyed with a mixture of turmeric, betel pepper, areca nut and lime.) Another yellow was obtained from a combination of mango bark and morinda, without the addition of oil or loba. (Note: The combination of mango bark and morinda, without oil or loba, was used in Flores and in Solor.)

At Ile Mandiri (East Flores regency) and Loba Tobi (Note: Loba Tobi or Lewotobi are common names for the district of Ilé Bura; tobi is the local Lamaholot name for the tamarind tree.) A beautiful yellow dye was obtained by boiling the wood chips of the 'yellowwood' tree, known locally as kajo kuma.

Manggarai used to export Arcangelisia flava (kayu kuning) to Java for the yellows in batik. Another export (from Flores and Adonara) in the same domain was a hardwood tree called kajo kuma, literally 'yellow wood', which gives a yellow dye. In the 1980s, it was still brought to Lembata for that purpose. (Note: The dye from kajo kuma was obtained by soaking fine wood chips in cold water without the addition of lime. Several immersions were required to produce the right shade. It is not clear whether this kajo kuma was laban or some other dyewood.)

laban as a dye is hardly used any longer in the Lesser Sunda Islands.

Green colour

In some regions of Flores, such as East Flores and Ende, green is hardly found in any textile. Green warp stripes are most likely to be found in textiles produced in the area of Sikka Natar, and from Lamalera on Lembata island. It is produced almost exclusively by applying alternatively blue and yellow dyes, but in Lamalera region it is obtained by crushing leaves and using the green juice thus produced – notably from Annona squamosa (dolima).

At Nita Kloang in the region of Krowé (Sikka regency), a green dye is made from the edible leaves of the Indian Coral tree (dadap), which may include such species as Erythrina variegata, E. subumbrans, E. indica and E. fuspa). The tree is used as a shade plant for cocoa and coffee plants. For the dye, the leaves are crushed with turmeric root and powdered lime.

Synthetic dyes

The earliest aniline dyes may have reached Indonesia in the 1880s, and brought to Flores by the Dutch steamers that serviced Ende and Larantuka. Up to the 1920s, they were likely only blue, red and magenta rather than green. (Note: In 1923, almost two-thirds of the 672 tons of aniline dyes imported into the Netherlands East Indies consisted of synthetic indigo. The remaining synthetic dyes would have been mostly purple, red, orange, and yellow. Even today, the number of homogeneous green dyes and pigments remains significantly less than that of any other major colour.)

It is impossible to say how quickly synthetic greens were incorporated into the weavings of the Lesser Sunda Islands. Any green that was included in early weavings from around the turn of the century is likely to have faded to blue or brown by now (Brackman 2009, 61). Indeed, by the 1950s and 1960s, more modern lightfast synthetic greens were being used in the stripes in the Sikkanese sarongs. They continue to be used in this way today without undermining the region's traditional textile culture. As of 2016, most areas of Flores still retain a degree of their former textile culture (Note: Other areas that have retained a degree of their former textile culture are Lembata, Savu and East Sumba.) and still use synthetic green only sparingly, compared to other places that are losing or have lost their textile culture, such as Manggarai and Ngada. (Note: Other regions that are in the process of losing or have already lost their textile culture are Bali, Sumbawa, Solor, Adonara, Alor, Roti and West Sumba.) In Sikka, it seems that chemical green has been frequently used since at least the 1960s and probably earlier.

==== Textile particularities of some areas ====
Ilé Bura region

In the past, the whole Ilé Bura region was a major centre of weaving, which was an important contribution to family income. As of 2016, weaving is confined to just three villages – Lewo Tobi, Lewouran, and Riang Baring, the latter being the most active.

Iwang Geté region

People of the Iwan geté region produce a very distinctive ikat cloth: the widest bands (called ina geté) bear such motifs as lizard (teké), a circular motif seen on some antique plates (pigan uben), spinning wheel (jata selér), and pineapple flower (petan puhun).

Ngadha region

Traditionally, in the Ngadha region, everyday clothing consists of a plain, stark indigo sarong. However, there is also a type of ikat, often referred to as Bajawa ikat after its capital, that features primitive-style designs and is made with only indigo dye. One characteristic of this ikat is the very intense blue, which is unique to this piece and nowhere else in the archipelago; this color comes from the high concentration of indigo achieved through prolonged and repeated steepings of the cloth in the tincture. It also means that the motifs, made by ties on the warp, should have come out white but are more often of a very pale blue because the pigment bath has had time to seep into the yarn beyond the resist of the ties.

Another characteristic of Ngadha ikat is its motifs. Horses (jara) are a frequent one, as they are a sign of high social rank; this ties up with the fact that decorated cloths were traditionally worn only by respected clan members. (Note: In the Ngadha region, tradition required that younger people would wear only plain or nearly plain cloths. However, advancing in age was not sufficient to be allowed more prestigious, adorned clothes; one also had to undergo various levels of initiation and arrange for grand feasts, notably those where buffalo would be slaughtered. Only members of the upper strata of society could afford those, and ikat adorned with narrow bands of horses was a marker of that aristocratic status. These days, this is no longer a traditional law. Still, in some communities, there remains a sense that only people of high social standing should wear these prestigious garments, even if there is a reluctance to discuss such class distinctions.) The particularity here is that they are executed as stick figures, by which they resemble some prehistoric cave drawings. This gives them a strikingly 'primitive' appearance and makes them highly sought-after items. (Note: The Ngadha, and the Manggarai to the west, have long had a legend about 'little people' who lived among them till as late as the 1500s. Add to this their primitive, cave-drawing-like images on Ngadha ikats, and that the Ngadha and Keo languages are curiously 'nude' versions of Malay, as if encountering difficulties in assimilating their full complexity. For example, the Austronesian family of languages makes abundant use of prefixes or suffixes (which form new words by adding extensions either before or after root words, such as [per-]form or child[-hood]). In contrast, the Ngadha language uses no prefixes or suffixes. This has led linguist John McWhorter to speculate that maybe these two rudimentary languages came into being through contact with the 'little people' of Flores, Homo floresiensis.)

Most of the ikat on Flores is produced in villages located in the temperate, middle elevation zones, where indigo can be cultivated. The best known are Jerebuu and Langa, in a valley on the east side of the Inierie volcano, and Lopijo and Toni, tucked behind the rim of mountains that surround Bajawa, north of the same volcano. The latter are still very isolated and conservative, still using indigenous cotton and indigo only. The clothes from these localities are admired throughout the Ngadha region – and nowadays in New York and Singapore as well.

== Tourism ==
The most famous tourist attraction in Flores is the 1,639-metre-high (5,377-foot) Kelimutu volcano, which contains three colored lakes, located in the district of Ende, close to the town of Moni. However, there is also the Inierie volcano near Bajawa. These crater lakes are located in the caldera of a volcano and are fed by a volcanic gas source, resulting in highly acidic water. The colored lakes change colors on an irregular basis, depending on the oxidation state of the lake from bright red to green and blue.

There are snorkeling and diving locations along the north coast of Flores, most notably Maumere and Riung. However, due to the destructive practice of local fishermen using bombs to fish, and locals selling shells to tourists, combined with the after-effects of a devastating tsunami in 1992, the reefs have slowly been destroyed.

Labuan Bajo, located on the western tip, is often used by tourists as a base to visit Komodo and Rinca islands. Labuan Bajo also attracts scuba divers, as whale sharks inhabit the waters around Labuan Bajo.

The Luba and Bena villages in Flores feature traditional houses. Bena is also noted for its Stone Age megaliths.

Larantuka, on the isle's eastern end, is known for its Holy Week festivals.

In recent years, local tourist firms around Kelimutu have begun promoting cycling tours around Flores, some of which take up to five or six days, depending on the particular program.

== Economy ==
In addition to tourism, the main economic activities on Flores are agriculture, fishing, and seaweed production. The primary food crops being grown on Flores are rice, maize, sweet potato and cassava, while the main cash crops are coffee, coconut, candle nut and cashew. Flores is one of the newest origins for Indonesian coffee. Previously, most Arabica coffee (Coffea arabica) from Flores was blended with other origins. Now, demand is growing for this coffee due to its rich body and sweet, chocolatey, floral, and woody notes.

In the 1980s, cotton crops were encouraged to generate income for the poorer subsistence farmers. It is planted in low-lying areas of the island.

Jackfruit, which occurs throughout the Indonesian archipelago – and elsewhere -, is specifically cultivated in Manggarai and Sikka regencies, and probably in every other regency.

== Gallery ==
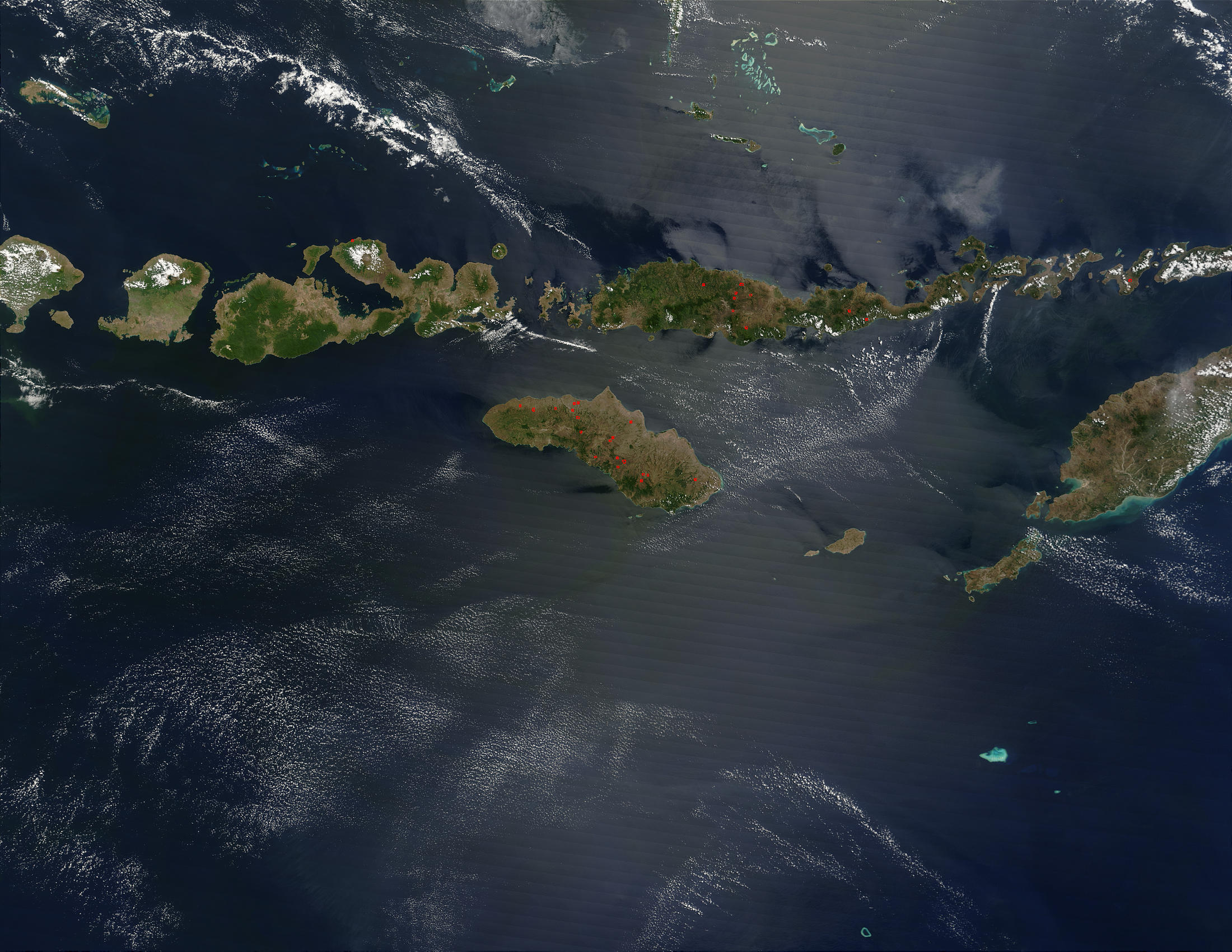
The Lesser Sunda Islands with Flores in the upper right

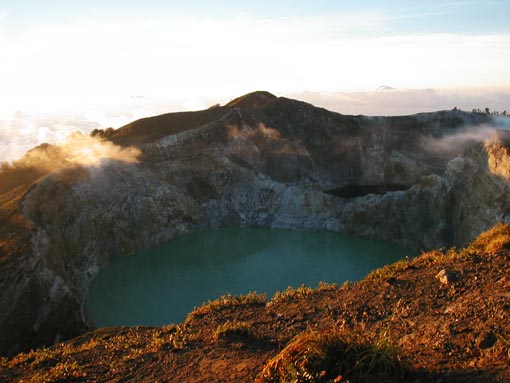
Kelimutu

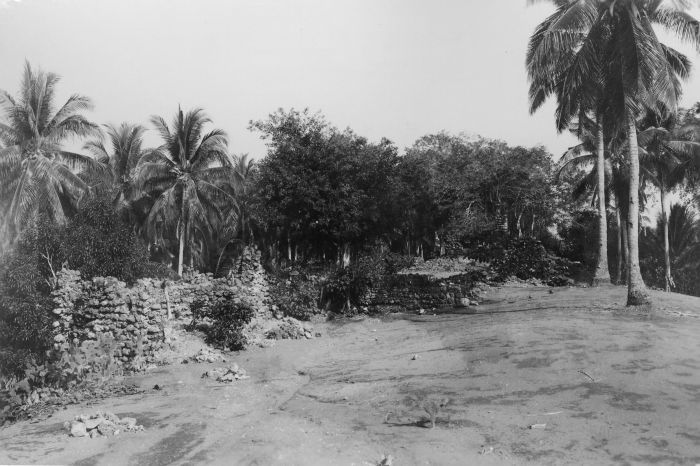
Ruins of a Portuguese fort, dating from the 16th century near Ende.

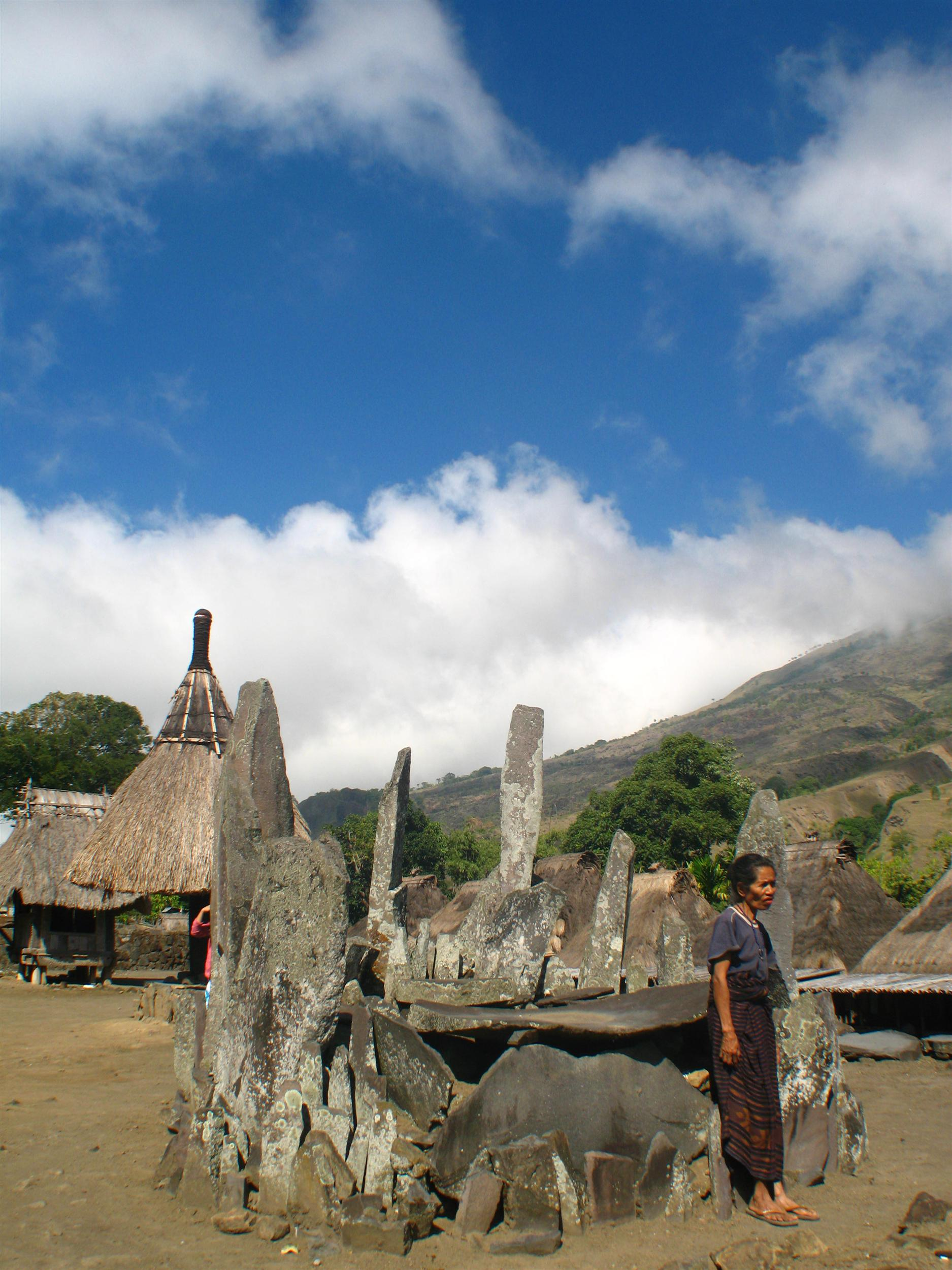
An ancient Ngada megalith

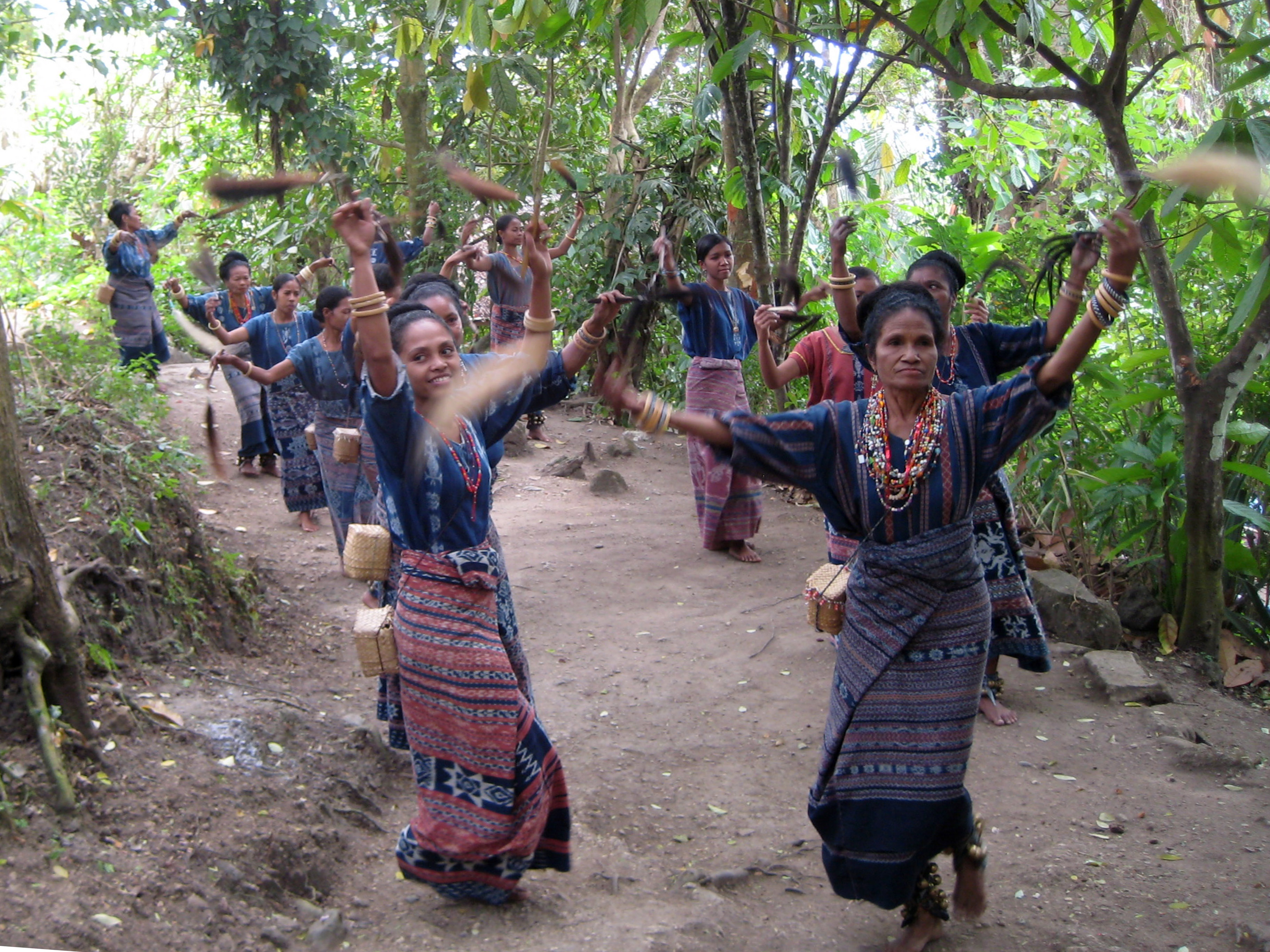
Dancers in Watublapi

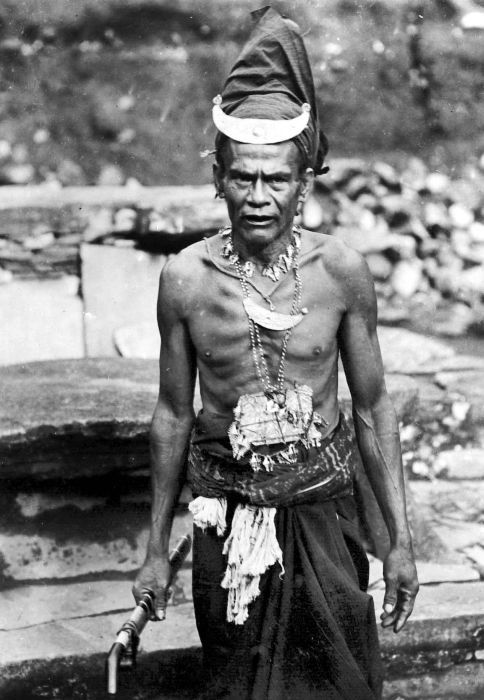
Villager with a headdress and chest ornamentation

== Transport ==
There are at least six airports in Flores distributed along the island, ordered from west to east:

- Komodo Airport and Port of Labuan Bajo in Labuan Bajo
- Frans Sales Lega Airport or Ruteng airport
- Pahdamaleda Airport or Bajawa airport
- Turelelo Soa Airport in Bajawa
- H. Hasan Aroeboesman Airport or Ende airport
- Frans Xavier Seda Airport or Maumere airport
- Gewayantana Airport close to Larantuka city.

== See also ==
- Dutch colonial empire
- Flores (Azores)
- Kingdom of Larantuka
- Maunura
- Portuguese Empire
- Simon Milward
- Theodorus Verhoeven

== Bibliography ==
- Hamilton, Roy W. (1994). Gift of the Cotton Maiden: Textiles of Flores and the Solor Islands. Los Angeles: Fowler Museum of Cultural History, UCLA. ISBN 978-0-930741-38-9.
- L., Klemen (1999–2000). "Forgotten Campaign: The Dutch East Indies Campaign 1941–1942". Archived from the original on 26 July 2011.
- Rappoport, Dana (2010). "L'énigme des duos alternés à Flores et Solor (Lamaholot, Indonésie)". Archipel (in French). 79 (79): 215–256. doi:10.3406/arch.2010.4167.
- Schröter, Susanne (2010). "The Indigenization of Catholicism on Flores" (PDF). Christianity in Indonesia: Perspectives of Power. Southeast Asian modernities, vol. 12. Berlin; Münster; Piscataway, NJ: Lit. pp. 90–105. ISBN 978-3-643-10798-5.
- Steenbrink, Karel (2013). "Dutch Colonial Containment of Islam in Manggarai, West-Flores, in Favour of Catholicism, 1907–1942". Bijdragen tot de Taal-, Land- en Volkenkunde. 169 (1): 104–128. doi:10.1163/22134379-12340024.
