= John McWhorter =

American linguist and academic (born 1965)

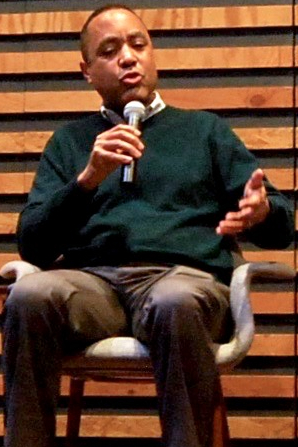
- McWhorter in 2017
- Born: John Hamilton McWhorter V October 6, 1965 (age 61); Philadelphia, Pennsylvania, U.S.
- Occupations: Academic and Commentator

Academic background
- Education: Simon's Rock College (AA); Rutgers University, New Brunswick (BA); New York University (MA); Stanford University (PhD)
- Thesis: Toward a New Model of Genesis: Competing Processes in the Birth of Saramaccan Creole (1993)

Academic work
- Discipline: Linguistics; Creolistics
- Institutions: Cornell University; University of California, Berkeley; Manhattan Institute; Columbia University
- Main interests: Music, American history, Race relations in the United States

John Hamilton McWhorter V (/məkˈhwɔːrtər/; born October 6, 1965) is an American linguist. He is an associate professor of linguistics at Columbia University, where he also teaches American studies and music history. He has authored a number of books on race relations and African-American culture, and is a political commentator especially in his New York Times newsletter.

== Early life and education ==
McWhorter was born in Philadelphia, and raised in the Mount Airy neighborhood of Philadelphia and in Lawnside, New Jersey. His father, John Hamilton McWhorter IV (1927–1996), was a college administrator, and his mother, Schelysture Gordon McWhorter (1937–2011), taught social work at Temple University. McWhorter attended Friends Select School in Philadelphia, and after tenth grade he was accepted to Simon's Rock College, where he earned an AA degree. McWhorter has described his upbringing as part of the Black middle class. He has also attributed some of his views to the Quaker school he attended as a child.

McWhorter later attended Rutgers University and received a B.A. degree in French in 1985. He obtained an M.A. degree in American Studies from New York University. In 1993, he earned his Ph.D. degree in linguistics from Stanford University. His dissertation focused on Saramaccan, a creole language spoken by approximately 58,000 people of West African descent in Suriname.

== Career ==
=== Academia ===
McWhorter taught linguistics at Cornell University from 1993 to 1995. He then became an associate professor of linguistics at the University of California, Berkeley, where he worked from 1995 until 2003. He left that position to become a senior fellow at the Manhattan Institute, a conservative think tank.

Since 2008, McWhorter has taught linguistics, American studies, and classes in the core curriculum program at Columbia University. As Columbia's Department of Linguistics had been dissolved in 1989, he was initially assigned to the Department of English and Comparative Literature. The Program of Linguistics, including a revived undergraduate major in 2021, is housed in the Department of Slavic Languages.

McWhorter is the instructor of the courses "The Story of Human Language"; "Understanding Linguistics: The Science of Language"; "Myths, Lies and Half-Truths About English Usage"; "Language Families of the World"; "Ancient Writing and the History of the Alphabet"; and "Language From A to Z", as part of The Great Courses, a series produced by The Teaching Company.

=== Writing and commentary ===
McWhorter has written for Time, The Wall Street Journal, The Chronicle of Higher Education, The Washington Post, The New Republic, Politico, Forbes, The Chicago Tribune, The New York Daily News, City Journal, The New York Sun, The New Yorker, The Root, The Daily Beast, Books & Culture, and CNN.

McWhorter was contributing editor at The New Republic from 2001 to 2014. He is a contributing editor at The Atlantic. After writing op-eds for The New York Times for several years, he became an Opinion columnist there in 2021. He hosts the Lexicon Valley podcast, previously for Slate from 2016 to 2021 and since then for Booksmart Studios.

McWhorter has published a number of books on linguistics and on race relations, including The Power of Babel: A Natural History of Language, Our Magnificent Bastard Tongue: The Untold History of English, Doing Our Own Thing: The Degradation of Language and Music and Why You Should, Like, Care, and Losing the Race: Self-Sabotage in Black America.

== Linguistics ==
Much of McWhorter's academic work is concerned with creole languages and their relationship to other languages, often focusing on the Suriname creole language Saramaccan. His work has expanded to a general investigation of the effect of second-language acquisition on a language. Regarding the various positions arising from the universal grammar debate, he describes himself as partial to the theoretical frameworks of Peter Culicover and Ray Jackendoff.

Some of McWhorter's fellow linguists, such as Mauro Giuffré of the University of Palermo, suggest that his notions of simplicity and complexity are impressionistic and grounded on comparisons with European languages, and they point to exceptions to his proposed correlations.

=== Theory of creole ===
External videos
- Presentation by McWhorter on What Language Is, August 9, 2011, C-SPAN

McWhorter has argued that languages naturally tend toward complexity and irregularity, a tendency that is reversed only by adults acquiring the language, and creole formation is simply an extreme example of the latter. As examples, he cites English, Mandarin Chinese, Persian, Swahili, Indonesian, and modern colloquial varieties of Arabic. He has outlined his ideas in academic format in Language Interrupted and Linguistic Simplicity and Complexity and, for the general public, in What Language Is and Our Magnificent Bastard Tongue.

=== Austronesian languages ===
The Austronesian family of languages makes abundant use of prefixes and suffixes (which form new words by adding extensions either before or after root-words, such as [per-]form or child[-hood]), but the languages from the center of Flores Island, which belong to that family, are curiously devoid of prefixes or suffixes and are not tonal either (tones may make up for the loss or absence of affixes): Kéo, Lio, Ngadha, Rongga, Ende. McWhorter extends to those the hypothesis of language simplification by acquisition during adulthood. He links this with Homo floresiensis, the most recent individuals known dated from 12,000 years ago. Austronesians came to Flores from Taiwan in the west only a few thousand years ago. Current legends exist that tell of "little people" or ebo gogo who lived among the ancestors of present Floresians, until as late as the 1500s, and possibly only 200 years ago, when the "little people" were exterminated "because they kept stealing". These legends are most vivid in the middle of Flores island, their vividness decreasing as the distance from the center increases towards the west and they are entirely absent in the east.

==== The Language Hoax ====
McWhorter is a vocal critic of the Sapir–Whorf hypothesis. In his 2014 book The Language Hoax, he argues that, although language influences thought in an "infinitesimal way" and culture is expressed through language, he believes that language itself does not create different ways of thinking or determine worldviews.

== Political views ==
McWhorter has characterized himself as "a cranky liberal Democrat". In support of this description, he states that while he "disagree[s] sustainedly with many of the tenets of the civil rights orthodoxy", he also "supports Barack Obama, reviles the war on drugs, supports gay marriage, never voted for George W. Bush, and writes of Black English as coherent speech". McWhorter supported Ralph Nader in his 1996 and 2000 presidential campaigns.

McWhorter has stated that the conservative Manhattan Institute, for which he worked, "has always been hospitable to Democrats". McWhorter is biweekly guest on The Glenn Show, a commentary podcast hosted by Glenn Loury, a member of the Manhattan Institute and professor of economics at Brown University. Political theorist Mark Satin identifies McWhorter as a radical centrist thinker.

=== Views on rap music ===
In 2003, McWhorter criticized the influence of hip-hop on young African-Americans. He blamed the subculture underlying the genre for promoting violence, misogyny, and lawlessness, reserving particular criticism for artists such as Tupac Shakur, N.W.A, Suge Knight, 50 Cent, Jay-Z, and Sean Combs. In 2023, McWhorter wrote a contrasting piece presenting hip-hop in a more positive light, stating that it had become a form of American poetry.

=== Views on racism ===
In a 2001 article, McWhorter argued that the attitudes and general behavior of black people, rather than white racism, were what held African Americans back in the United States. According to McWhorter, "victimology, separatism, and anti-intellectualism underlie the general black community's response to all race-related issues", and "it's time for well-intentioned whites to stop pardoning as 'understandable' the worst of human nature whenever black people exhibit it".

In an interview on NPR in April 2015, McWhorter claimed that the word "thug" was becoming code for "the N-word" or "black people ruining things" when used by whites in reference to criminal activity. He added that use by President Barack Obama and former Baltimore Mayor Stephanie Rawlings-Blake (for which she later apologized) could not be interpreted in the same way, given that among blacks the use of "thug" often connotes admiration for black self-direction and survival.

McWhorter has argued that software algorithms by themselves cannot be racist since, unlike humans, they lack intention. Rather, unless the human engineers behind a technological product intend for it to discriminate against people of a particular ethnicity, any unintentional bias should be seen as a software bug that needs to be fixed ("an obstacle to achievement") rather than an issue of racism.

McWhorter has criticized left-wing and activist educators in particular, such as Paulo Freire and Jonathan Kozol. McWhorter has criticized both fearmongering and dismissal of concerns over the usage of critical race theory in education. In 2021, McWhorter argued in a New York Times op-ed that "if critical race theory isn’t being taught to children—and in a technical sense, it isn’t—then it’s hardly illogical to suppose that some other concern may be afoot." McWhorter argues instead for continued concern over critical race influenced teaching, which McWhorter worries would be simplistic if taught to children and ineffective to produce nuanced discussion. McWhorter has argued that affirmative action should be based on class rather than race.

=== Views on anti-racism ===
In 2018, McWhorter posited that anti-racism has become as harmful in the United States as racism itself. In 2014, McWhorter criticized the term "microaggression". In 2016, he criticized what he regards as the overly casual conflation of racial bias with white supremacy. As early as December 2018, McWhorter described anti-racism as a "religious movement".

In July 2020, McWhorter criticized Robin DiAngelo's 2018 book White Fragility, following its resurgence in sales during the George Floyd protests, beginning in May 2020, arguing that it "openly infantilized Black people" and "simply dehumanized us", and "does not see fit to address why all of this agonizing soul-searching [for residual racism by white people] is necessary to forging change in society. One might ask just how a people can be poised for making change when they have been taught that pretty much anything they say or think is racist and thus antithetical to the good."

External videos
- Presentation by McWhorter on Woke Racism, November 2, 2021, C-SPAN

In his 2021 book Woke Racism, McWhorter argues that the anti-racism ideology has been elevated into a religion: "I do not mean that these people’s ideology is 'like' a religion... I mean that it actually is a religion... An anthropologist would see no difference in type between Pentecostalism and this new form of antiracism."

McWhorter expands upon his previous views and argues that "third wave anti-racism" is a religion he terms "Electism", with white privilege as original sin. McWhorter likens the books White Fragility, How to Be an Antiracist and Between the World and Me to sacred religious texts. He argues that this hypothesized status as a religion explains the behavior of its adherents, whom he calls "the Elect".

He advises that since the faith (like all faith) is not open to discussion, arguments with its adherents should be avoided in favor of pragmatic action against racism. McWhorter advocates three programs: ending the war on drugs, teaching reading by phonics to children lacking books at home, and free vocational education, promoting the idea that not everyone needs a four-year college education to succeed. In June 2023, McWhorter expressed qualified support for reparations for African Americans, particularly those descended from victims of redlining.

== Personal life ==
McWhorter separated from his wife in 2019. He has two daughters. He plays the piano and has appeared in musical theater productions. McWhorter is an atheist.

McWhorter is proficient in English, French, Spanish, and Saramaccan, and has some competence in Russian and several other languages.

In 2025, he joined Richard Dawkins for a discussion of "The link between evolution and language."

== Bibliography ==
External videos
- In Depth interview with McWhorter, March 2, 2008, C-SPAN
- Presentation by McWhorter on Losing the Race, August 18, 2000, C-SPAN
- Presentation by McWhorter on Losing the Race, March 20, 2001, C-SPAN
- Booknotes interview with McWhorter on Authentically Black, March 2, 2003, C-SPAN
- Presentation by McWhorter on Doing Our Own Thing, October 28, 2003, C-SPAN
- Presentation by McWhorter on Winning the Race, April 3, 2006, C-SPAN
- Presentation by McWhorter on All About the Beat, June 17, 2008, C-SPAN
- Washington Journal interview with McWhorter on All About the Beat, July 8, 2008, C-SPAN
- Presentation by McWhorter on Words on the Move, December 7, 2016, C-SPAN
- Presentation by McWhorter on Talking Back, Talking Black, April 19, 2017, C-SPAN
- Presentation by McWhorter on Nine Nasty Words, April 30, 2021, C-SPAN

- 1997: Towards a New Model of Creole Genesis ISBN 0-820-43312-8
- 1998: Word on the Street: Debunking the Myth of a "Pure" Standard English ISBN 0-738-20446-3
- 2000: Spreading the Word: Language and Dialect in America ISBN 0-325-00198-7
- 2000: The Missing Spanish Creoles: Recovering the Birth of Plantation Contact Languages ISBN 0-520-21999-6
- 2000: Losing the Race: Self-Sabotage in Black America ISBN 0-684-83669-6
- 2001: The Power of Babel: A Natural History of Language ISBN 0-06-052085-X
- 2003: Authentically Black: Essays for the Black Silent Majority ISBN 1-592-40001-9
- 2003: Doing Our Own Thing: The Degradation of Language and Music and Why We Should, Like, Care ISBN 1-592-40016-7
- 2005: Defining Creole ISBN 0-195-16669-8
- 2005: Winning the Race: Beyond the Crisis in Black America ISBN 1-592-40188-0
- 2007: Language Interrupted: Signs of Non-Native Acquisition in Standard Language Grammars ISBN 0-195-30980-4
- 2008: All About the Beat: Why Hip-Hop Can't Save Black America ISBN 1-592-40374-3
- 2008: Our Magnificent Bastard Tongue: The Untold History of English ISBN 1-592-40395-6
- 2011: Linguistic Simplicity and Complexity: Why Do Languages Undress? ISBN 978-1-934-07837-2
- 2011: What Language Is: (And What It Isn't and What It Could Be) ISBN 978-1-592-40625-8
- 2012: A Grammar of Saramaccan Creole (co-authored with Jeff Good) ISBN 978-3-11-027643-5
- 2014: The Language Hoax: Why the World Looks the Same in Any Language ISBN 978-0-199-36158-8
- 2016: Words on the Move: Why English Won't – and Can't – Sit Still (Like, Literally) ISBN 978-1-627-79471-8
- 2017: Talking Back, Talking Black: Truths about America's Lingua Franca ISBN 978-1-942-65820-7
- 2018: The Creole Debate ISBN 978-1-108-42864-4
- 2021: Nine Nasty Words: English in the Gutter: Then, Now, and Forever ISBN 978-0-593-18879-8
- 2021: Woke Racism: How a New Religion Has Betrayed Black America ISBN 978-0-593-42306-6
- 2025: Pronoun Trouble: The Story of Us in Seven Little Words ISBN 978-0-593-71328-0
