= Ende =

Ende may refer to

== Places ==
- Ende Regency, a regency (second level subdivision) of Indonesia
- Ende (town), the seat (capital) of Ende Regency

== People ==
- Ende (artist), 10th-century Spanish manuscript illuminator
- Erik Ende, a leader of Scouting in Sweden
- Edgar Ende (1901–1965), German surrealist painter
- Hans am Ende (1864–1918), German Impressionist painter
- Harald Ende (born 1929), German musician
- Hermann Ende (1829–1907), German architect
- Joop van den Ende (born 1942), Dutch media tycoon and theatrical producer
- Karl Friedrich am Ende (1756-1810), Austrian general in the War of the Fourth Coalition
- Michael Ende (1929–1995), German fantasy writer, son of Edgar Ende
- Tan Ende (born 1971), Chinese footballer and coach

== Other uses ==
- Buku Ende, a book of hymns in the Batak language used in the Batak Christian Protestant Church in Indonesia
- Ende: A Diary Of The Third World War, a post-apocalyptic novel by Anton-Andreas Guha
- Ende language (Indonesia) of Flores Island, Indonesia
- Ende language, a variety of the Agob language of Papua New Guinea
- Ende people, an ethnic group in Indonesia
- Ende or H. Hasan Aroeboesman Airport, Flores Island, Indonesia
- The End key in the German keyboard layout

== See also ==
- Van der Ende, a Dutch surname
