= Paruntuk Kana =

Poetic type of Makassarese proverb

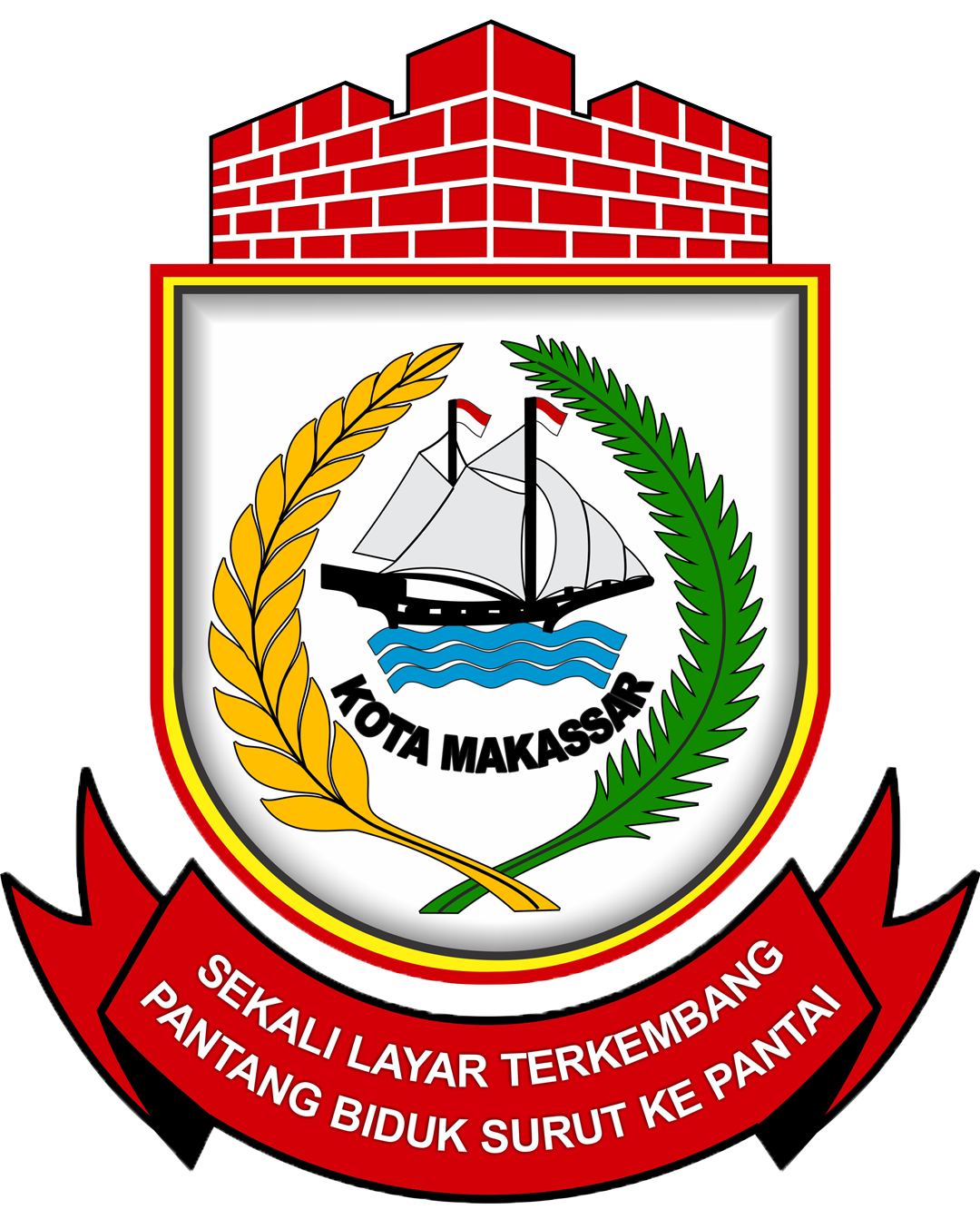
Makassar city sign

Paruntuk Kana (Lontara script: ᨄᨑᨘᨈᨘᨀᨊ, parable) is a type of Makassarese poetry. It is similar to a proverb or aphorism and conveys advice, satire, or praise. Nowadays, Paruntuk Kana is virtually forgotten by Makassarese people as a part of their culture. In the past, it was used to show the respectful or reminder about bad behavior.

As Paruntuk Kana, Pasang is one of the Makassar literature types. It is the mean will of the old people about clues that can used as rule in social life. especially about language and culture in Makassar such as religion, morality education, social life, economic etc. One of it samples is morality education. It is about honesty that everyone has to own it. Example: Pasanna IMangngadacinna daeng Sitaba karaeng Pattingngallowang.
