= Soʼa language =

Austronesian language spoken in Indonesia

Soʼa
- Central Ngada
- Native to: Indonesia
- Region: central Flores
- Native speakers: (10,000 cited 1994)
- Language family: Austronesian: Malayo-Polynesian; Central–Eastern MP; Sumba–Flores; Ende–Manggarai; Central Flores; Ngadʼa–Soʼa; Soʼa

Language codes
- ISO 639-3: ssq
- Glottolog: cent2074
- ELP: So'a

Soʼa (Central Ngada) is a language of central Flores, in East Nusa Tenggara Province, Indonesia. It forms a dialect cluster with Ngadha.
