= Rongga language =

Austronesian language spoken in Flores, Indonesia

Rongga
- Native to: Indonesia
- Region: central Flores
- Ethnicity: Rongga
- Native speakers: 4,000 (2005)
- Language family: Austronesian: Malayo-Polynesian; Central–Eastern MP; Sumba–Flores; Ende–Manggarai; Central Flores; Rongga

Language codes
- ISO 639-3: ror
- Glottolog: rong1269
- ELP: Rongga

Rongga is a language of central Flores, in East Nusa Tenggara province, Indonesia. Rongga is closely related to Ngadha, and more distantly to Manggarai.

Locally, it is considered part of the Manggarai culture; however, its closer linguistic relatives include Ngadha and Lio, both belonging to the Central Flores subgroup. Typologically, it is an isolating language. Like other Central Flores languages, it uses elements of a base-5 numeral system, possibly exhibiting the influence of a hypothetical Papuan linguistic substratum.

When written, it is spelled with Indonesian-like orthographic conventions. Digraphs such as zh, dh and bh are used to record sounds specific to this language.

== Bibliography ==
- I Wayan Arka; et al. (Fransiscus Seda, Antonius Gelang, Yohanes Nani, Ivan Ture) (2011). A Rongga-English Dictionary with English-Rongga Finderlist. Jakarta: Atma Jaya University Press. ISBN 978-602-8904-19-3.
