= Buginese (Unicode block) =

- Range: U+1A00..U+1A1F (32 code points)
- Plane: BMP
- Scripts: Buginese
- Major alphabets: Buginese
- Assigned: 30 code points
- Unused: 2 reserved code points

Unicode version history
- 4.1 (2005): 30 (+30)

Unicode documentation
- Code chart ∣ Web page

Buginese is a Unicode block containing characters of the Lontara script used to write the Buginese and Makassar languages of Sulawesi.

Buginese^{[1]}^{[2]} Official Unicode Consortium code chart (PDF)
| | 0 | 1 | 2 | 3 | 4 | 5 | 6 | 7 | 8 | 9 | A | B | C | D | E | F |
| U+1A0x | ᨀ | ᨁ | ᨂ | ᨃ | ᨄ | ᨅ | ᨆ | ᨇ | ᨈ | ᨉ | ᨊ | ᨋ | ᨌ | ᨍ | ᨎ | ᨏ |
| U+1A1x | ᨐ | ᨑ | ᨒ | ᨓ | ᨔ | ᨕ | ᨖ | ◌ᨗ | ◌ᨘ | ᨙ◌ | ◌ᨚ | ◌ᨛ | | | ᨞ | ᨟ |
Notes: 1. As of Unicode version 16.0; 2. Grey areas indicate non-assigned code points

== History ==
The following Unicode-related documents record the purpose and process of defining specific characters in the Buginese block:

| Version | Final code points (Note: Proposed code points and characters names may differ from final code points and names) | Count | L2 ID | WG2 ID | Document |
|---|---|---|---|---|---|
| 4.1 | U+1A00..1A1B, 1A1E..1A1F | 30 | L2/98-021 | N1657 | Everson, Michael (1997-12-08), Proposal to encode Buginese in ISO/IEC 10646 |
| 4.1 | U+1A00..1A1B, 1A1E..1A1F | 30 | L2/98-070 | | Aliprand, Joan; Winkler, Arnold, "3.A.2. item e. Buginese", Minutes of the joint UTC and L2 meeting from the meeting in Cupertino, February 25-27, 1998 |
| 4.1 | U+1A00..1A1B, 1A1E..1A1F | 30 | L2/98-286 | N1703 | Umamaheswaran, V. S.; Ksar, Mike (1998-07-02), "8.9.1", Unconfirmed Meeting Minutes, WG 2 Meeting #34, Redmond, WA, USA; 1998-03-16--20 |
| 4.1 | U+1A00..1A1B, 1A1E..1A1F | 30 | L2/99-011 | N1930 | Everson, Michael (1998-11-24), Revised proposal for encoding the Buginese script in the UCS |
| 4.1 | U+1A00..1A1B, 1A1E..1A1F | 30 | L2/03-191 | N2588 | Everson, Michael (2003-06-09), Final proposal for encoding the Buginese script in the UCS |
| 4.1 | U+1A00..1A1B, 1A1E..1A1F | 30 | L2/03-253 | | Kai, Daniel (2003-08-13), Lepcha, Limbu, Syloti, Saurashtra, Tai Le and Bugis Proposals |
| 4.1 | U+1A00..1A1B, 1A1E..1A1F | 30 | L2/03-254 | | Kai, Daniel (2003-08-13), Introduction to the Bugis Script |
| 4.1 | U+1A00..1A1B, 1A1E..1A1F | 30 | L2/03-320 | N2633R | Everson, Michael (2003-10-05), Revised final proposal for encoding the Lontara (Buginese) script in the UCS |
| 4.1 | U+1A00..1A1B, 1A1E..1A1F | 30 | L2/13-011 | | Moore, Lisa (2013-02-04), "Consensus 134-C4", UTC #134 Minutes, "Change the general category and bidi class of U+1A1B BUGINESE VOWEL SIGN AE to "Mn" and "NSM", for Unicode 6.3." |
