= Lontara Bilang-bilang =

Cipher of the Lontara script

Bilang-bilang
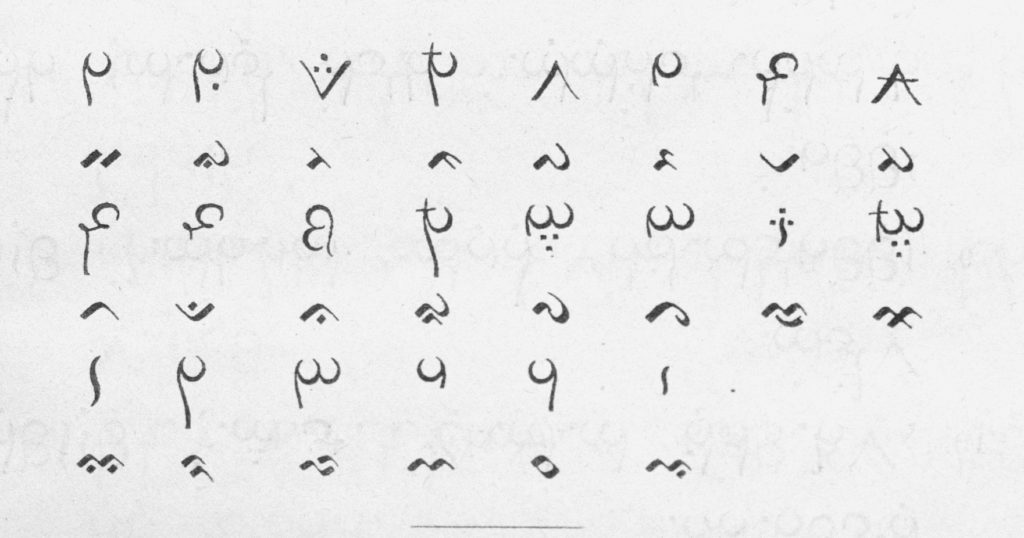
- Script type: Abugida
- Period: 17th century – present
- Languages: Buginese language

Related scripts
- Parent systems: Eastern Arabic numerals + i‘jām (consonants), Lontara (vowel diacritics and punctuation): Bilang-bilang

Lontara Bilang-bilang is a cipher of the Lontara script, currently used for Buginese poetry. This script uses the Eastern Arabic numerals-inspired letterform to substitute the Lontara script, as a way to hide it to the Dutch at the time. It was an adaptation to a similar ciphers of the Arabic script that has been used in South Asia around the 19th century.

== Usage ==
In Buginese literature, Lontara Bilang-bilang is sometimes used as a substitute to Lontara script in writing basa to bakke', a play-on-words, as well as élong maliung bettuanna, poetry with some hidden meaning using basa to bakke'. In this script, each base letter in standard Lontara are substituted with forms derived from Arabic script and its numerals, with standard, unchanged Lontara vowel diacritics attached to them.

== Cipher system ==
Lontara Bilang-Bilang substitutes Arabic letters with stylized numerals in accordance with Abjad numerals, a system that has been used in 19 AD in what is now Pakistan and Afghanistan. In Bilang-Bilang, many letters for Arabic sounds not in Buginese are not used, while for sounds existing in Buginese and Malay, new letters are added with more stylization. For example, ب have a numeral value of 2 and therefore is substituted by a stylized form of ٢, illustrated as follows:

Arabic	Value		Lontara Bilang-bilang	Lontara	Latin	Comments
ب	٢	2		ᨅ	ba	Stylization of ٢ with a short vertical line
ك	٢٠	20		ᨀ	ka	Stylization of ٢ with a medium vertical line
ر	٢٠٠	200		ᨑ	ra	Stylization of ٢ with a long vertical line

Jawi letters for Malay and Buginese sounds are formed with dots as equivalent for its Arabic counterpart. For example. ج (jim) uses the form of ٣, while چ (ca) uses the form of ٣ as well but with the addition of three dots, illustrated as follows:

Arab	Value		Lontara Bilang-bilang	Lontara	Latin	Comments
ج	٣	3		ᨍ	ja	Stylization of ٣
چ				ᨌ	ca	with three dots, analogous to چ
ك	٢٠	20		ᨀ	ka	Stylization of ٢
ࢴ				ᨁ	ga	with one dot, analogous to ࢴ

Pre-nasal sounds are formed with the addition of a diacritic line, illustrated as follows:

Arab	Value		Lontara Bilang-bilang	Lontara	Latin	Comments
ك	٢٠	20		ᨀ	ka	Stylization of ٢ with a medium vertical line
				ᨃ	ngka	with a diacritic line
ر	٢٠٠	200		ᨑ	ra	Stylization of ٢ with a long vertical line
				ᨋ	nra	with a diacritic line

== Letterform table ==
Arabic Jawi	Numerical Value		Lontara Bilang-bilang	Lontara Buginese	Latin	Arabic Jawi	Lontara Bilang-bilang	Lontara Buginese	Latin	Lontara Bilang-bilang	Lontara Buginese	Latin
ا	١	1		ᨕ	a							
ب	٢	2		ᨅ	ba							
ج	٣	3		ᨍ	ja	چ		ᨌ	ca		ᨏ	nca
د	۴	4		ᨉ	da							
ن	۵	5		ᨊ	na							
و	۶	6		ᨓ	wa							
ع	٧	7				ڠ		ᨂ	nga			
ف	٨	8		ᨄ	pa						ᨇ	mpa
ط	٩	9										
ي	١٠	10		ᨐ	ya	ۑ		ᨎ	nya			
ك	٢٠	20		ᨀ	ka	ࢴ		ᨁ	ga		ᨃ	ngka
ل	٣٠	30		ᨒ	la							
م	۴٠	40		ᨆ	ma							
س	۶٠	60		ᨔ	sa							
ر	٢٠٠	200		ᨑ	ra						ᨋ	nra
ت	۴٠٠	400		ᨈ	ta							
			^{[Note]}	ᨈ	ha							
Note: Lontara 'ha' "ᨖ" does not have a Bilang-bilang equivalent.

== Unicode ==
The Lontara Bilang-bilang Script has not yet been added into the Unicode standard as of version 14.0. A code range has been assigned for it in the Supplementary Multilingual Plane, but as of revision 14.0.0, no proposals has been made for assigning the letters.

== Example text ==
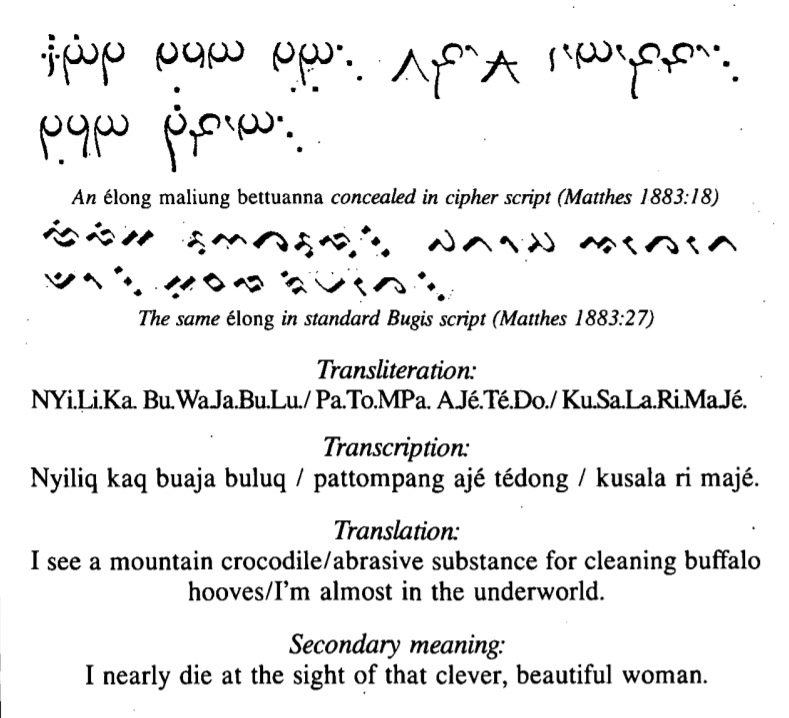
élong maliung bettuanna, a poem in Lontara and Bilang-Bilang cited by Matthes (1883)

== See also ==
- Buginese language
- Lontara script
- Cipher
- Thaana, a writing script used in Dhivehi language, where some consonants are also derived from Arabic numerals.
