= Central Flores languages =

Subgroup of the Austronesian language family

Central Flores
- Ngadha–Lio
- Geographic distribution: Flores (Indonesia)
- Linguistic classification: Austronesian: Malayo-Polynesian; Central–Eastern; Sumba–Flores; Central Flores
- Proto-language: Proto-Central Flores

Language codes
- Glottolog: ngad1266

The Central Flores languages (from Ngadha–Lio) are a subgroup of the Austronesian language family. They are spoken in the central part of Flores, one of the Lesser Sunda Islands in the eastern half of Indonesia. The speech area of the Central Flores languages is bordered to the west by the Manggarai language, and to the east by the Sikka language.

== Languages ==
The Central Flores subgroup comprises the following languages, from west to east (with subvarieties):

- Rongga
- Ngadha
- Namut–Nginamanu
- Soʼa
- Kéo
- Nage
- Ende
- Lio

== Grammar ==
Unlike most other Austronesian languages, the Central Flores languages are highly isolating. They completely lack derivational and inflectional morphemes, and core grammatical relations are mostly expressed by word order. For example, in Rongga, there is strict SVO word order: jara ndau kenda ja'o (lit. 'horse that kick I') 'that horse kick(ed) me'. Possession is expressed by placing the possessor after the possessed noun: ine ja'o (lit. 'mother I') 'my mother'.

== Prehistory ==
According to McWhorter (2010, 2011, 2019), the extreme isolating character of the Central Flores languages is the result of language shift through "heavy adult acquisition", which means that adult populations which originally spoke completely different languages shifted to a language ancestral to the Central Flores languages, but dropped all derivational and inflectional morphology. This process is characteristic for the development of pidgins and creoles, most of which display strong simplification of the source language.

McWhorter's (2019) hypothesis of adult acquisition and subsequent creolization is dismissed by Elias (2020), who proposes that the isolating character can better be explained by a pre-Austronesian substrate language, which must have had the typological features of the Mekong-Mamberamo area. Elias (2020) estimates that the switch would have taken place around 2,500–1,500 BCE.

There remains to explain why the ikat from Ngadha are the only such Floresian textiles to bear distinctive motifs of stick figures such as what may be encountered in prehistoric imaging; and what to make of the legends that talk of living side by side with some 'little people' until only a few centuries ago - said legends being very strong still in central Flores, less so in the west and inexistent in the east, a repartition which indicates a population movement of outsiders coming from the west.
