= Van der Ende =

Van de Ende, van den Ende, van der Ende, Vander Ende are forms of a Dutch toponymic surnames, meaning "from the end" (of the street, village, etc.). It is most common in the province of South Holland. Notable people with the surname include:

== Van den Ende ==
- Bjorn van den Ende (born 1986), Dutch rower
- Jan van den Ende (born 1954), Dutch organizational theorist
- Joop van den Ende (born 1942), Dutch media tycoon
- Walther van den Ende (born 1947), Belgian cinematographer

== Van der Ende ==
- Jacky van der Ende (born 1976), Dutch racing driver
- Mario van der Ende (born 1956), Dutch football referee
- Matt Vander Ende (born 1969), American drummer
- Ricardo van der Ende (born 1979), Dutch racing driver
- Ron van der Ende (born 1965), Dutch sculptor
- Toos van der Ende (born ca 1946), Dutch rower

== See also ==
- Franciscus van den Enden (1602–1674), Flemish philosopher and teacher of Spinoza
- Vander Ende-Onderdonk House, historic house in Ridgewood, Queens, New York
