= The Power of Babel =

2002 non-fiction book by John McWhorter

The Power of Babel: A Natural History of Language
- Front cover
- Author: John McWhorter
- Language: English
- Subject: Linguistics
- Publisher: Henry Holt
- Publication date: 2002
- Publication place: United States
- Media type: Print
- Pages: 352 pages
- ISBN: 006052085X

The Power of Babel: A Natural History of Language is a 2002 non-fiction book by American linguist John McWhorter. The book provides an overview of the then-recent research in the field of linguistics, focusing primarily on how languages have evolved and will continue to evolve over time. The author celebrates the diversity amongst the Earth's 6,000 languages, and uses examples from many of them to illustrate their complexities, including those spoken by peoples considered to be primitive by much of the world. The book received generally positive reviews, with reviewers praising McWhorter's thorough research and wealth of entertaining trivia, while criticizing the occasional errors in the text.

== Background ==
McWhorter, a linguistics professor at University of California, Berkeley while writing The Power of Babel, first discovered his love of languages as a child hearing Hebrew spoken for the first time. By the time the book was published McWhorter was capable of speaking three languages and reading seven. While studying at Stanford, he gained interest in the manner in which languages evolve and became especially enamored with creole languages and their formation.

The title of McWhorter's book refers to the biblical parable of the Tower of Babel. Early humanity, speaking only one language, attempted to build a tower to reach heaven, only to have God punish this arrogance by fracturing the one language into many and thus creating the multitude of tongues around the world. McWhorter revels in the diversity of languages, however, and spends much of his book detailing why their variety is something to be celebrated and preserved as much as possible.

== Synopsis ==
McWhorter approaches the study of the evolution of language in a manner akin to that of Charles Darwin's study of natural selection. Over time, and due to numerous environmental factors, languages morph into new forms and can even absorb characteristics that serve no useful purpose. Therefore, McWhorter argues, an "evolved" language is not inherently less complex or more civilized than a "primitive" language, and in fact the opposite can be true.

McWhorter describes language families and argues that the difference between the terms "language" and "dialect" is largely meaningless. He cites as an example the observation that speakers of Swedish, Norwegian, and Danish (the three of which he considers one language, which he collectively terms "Scandinavian") can understand one another more easily than Italian speakers can understand those speaking that language's Milanese dialect. Languages are essentially a collection of similar dialects, he says, and political factors more than anything determine which dialect is considered "standard". McWhorter quotes the linguist Uriel Weinreich as saying, "a language is a dialect with an army and a navy."

The author details how all languages sprang from a proto-language that originated approximately 150,000 years ago in eastern Africa. As this primordial tongue came into being it also underwent immediate change, eventually resulting in roughly 6,000 individual languages worldwide as of the early 21st century, none of which sound like what those first humans would have used. McWhorter laments the fact that every two weeks one of those 6,000 languages "dies", either by losing its usefulness or its last living speaker, and he reports one estimate that by the beginning of the next century, 90% of the earth's tongues could become extinct.

Having described his reasoning for the benefits of the existence of many varied world languages as well as the danger many of them face from the "encroachments of global capitalism", McWhorter implores his fellow linguists to do their part to save them. He allows that most of them will still die, but hopes that they can at least be recorded for research purposes. He also concedes that it is difficult to convince someone to study a dying tongue instead of a more common language with practical application. However, he uses the examples of Irish, Māori, Hawaiian, and other languages that have been revived from a near-moribund state as evidence that such revival is in fact possible.

== Reception ==
The Power of Babel released on January 15, 2002, to generally positive reviews. Writing for the Los Angeles Times, linguist Geoffrey Nunberg called it "entertaining and informative" while admitting that he is not quite as enthusiastic as McWhorter about the ongoing semantic changes in the English language. The Washington Post named it a "trivia lover's delight", while the Chicago Tribune termed it a "stimulating exploration of the essentials of semantic change".

The New Statesman's Kathryn Hughes enjoyed that the book could be read either as an impressive summary of the past half-century of linguistic research or as a trove of fascinating trivia, but criticized McWhorter's casual writing style and occasional factual error. Similarly, the reviewer for Newsweek believed the author's arguments were somewhat undermined by mistakes in the Latin he provided as examples.
