= Losing the Race =

2000 book by John McWhorter

Losing the Race: Self-Sabotage in Black America
- Author: John McWhorter
- Language: English
- Genre: Non-fiction
- Publication date: 2000
- Publication place: United States

Losing the Race: Self-Sabotage in Black America is a 2000 book by American linguist and political commentator John McWhorter, in which he argues that some elements of black culture are more responsible than external racial prejudice and discrimination for the social problems faced by black Americans several decades after the Civil Rights Movement. Specifically, McWhorter points to anti-intellectualism, separatism, and a self-perpetuated identity of victimhood as factors limiting them as a group.

The book was a New York Times bestseller and received mixed reactions. McWhorter considers it the work that first made him known to larger audiences and contributed to the perception of him being a conservative commentator.
