= Pallawa =

᨞

Pallawa
- U+1A1E ᨞ BUGINESE PALLAWA

In the Buginese language, pallawa is a punctuation symbol. It is composed of three cascading diagonal dots. A pallawa is used to separate rhythmico-intonational groups, thus functionally corresponding to the full stop and comma of the Latin script.

== See also ==
- Lontara script
- Passimbang
