= Ende people =

Ethnic group in Indonesia

Ende
Ata Ende, Ata Jaö
- A traditional house of the Ende people.

Total population
- 200,000 (1986)

Regions with significant populations
- Indonesia (Flores)

Languages
- Ende and Indonesian

Religion
- Islam and Christianity (mainly Catholicism)

Related ethnic groups
- Lio • Ngada • Nage

The Ende people (Ende: Ata Ende or Ata Jaö) are an ethnic group from the island of Flores in the Lesser Sunda Islands, Indonesia. According to the publication Народы и религии мира: Энциклопедия (1998), the population is 850,000 people, a population figure that is actually exaggerated and debatable, whereas in 1986 the entire Ende Regency had a population of almost 200,000 people. They are part of the Bima–Sumba-speaking people.

They are divided into two groups, namely coastal and mountain. Most of them practice either Islam or Christianity, but they also retain traditional beliefs (agrarian cults or ancestor cult). There is a belief in a supreme being nggaë, spirits (nitu), and witches (porho). They speak the Ende language of the Austronesian language family, which is divided into two dialects: Maukaro and Nangapanda.

== Religion ==
They are the indigenous people of the island of Flores. In the Middle Ages, they were influenced by the Majapahit empire which influenced the spread of Hinduism. The influence of Muslim traders and settlers reached the coastal Ende people. Islam spread between the 16th and 17th centuries. The dominant branch of Christianity is Catholicism, but there are also Protestantism among them.

== Society and distribution ==
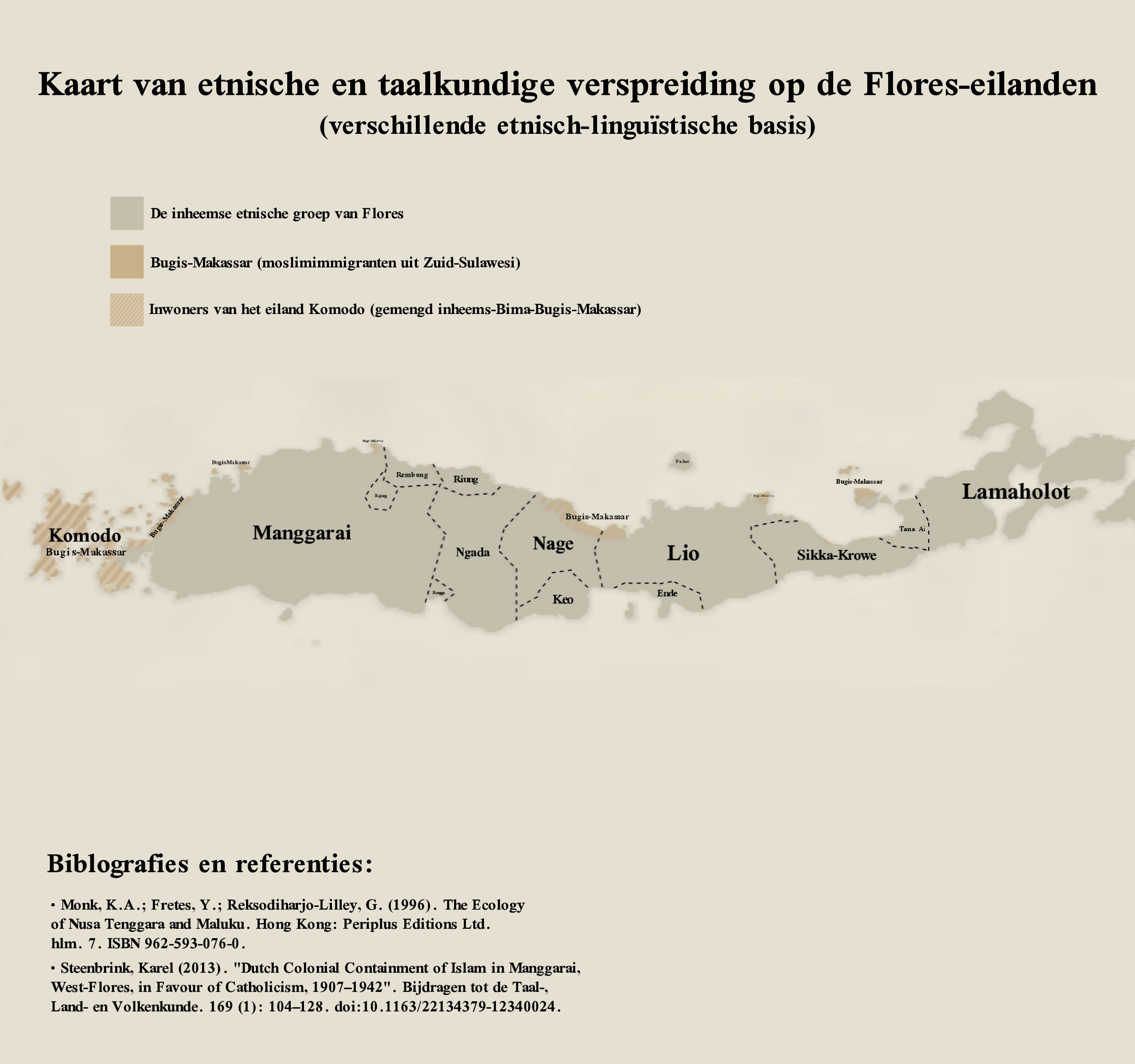
The Ende people are spread across the south-central part of Flores, between the distribution areas of the Lio people.

Traditionally, they practice manual agriculture based on slash-and-burn farming. In some places, they use artificial irrigation. Their social organization is based on patrilineal clans. The Ende people are familiar with the monarchy system, they have a self-governing government, the Ende Kingdom. The existence of the Ende Kingdom in the earliest known Dutch colonial government documents was that in 1793, the VOC first held a Korte Verklaring with the Ende Kingdom. This event became official evidence, from the modern administrative version typical of western colonialism, of the recognition of the existence of the Ende Kingdom in Flores. However, it is estimated that it existed before that year, with the initial suspicion that the Ende Kingdom existed more or less at the same time as the Portuguese were expelled from Ende Island in 1630.

The distribution area of the Ende people is in several districts in Ende Regency, including Nangapanda, Ende, South Ende, North Ende, Central Ende, East Ende, Ende Island, Ndona, and parts of Maukaro. Meanwhile in Nagekeo Regency, They are found in several areas, including parts of Nangaroro. The area of origin of the Ende people borders the Nage and Keo peoples to the west and the Lio people to the east. The natural environment where they live is a mountainous area with sharp hills and rare wetlands. Nowadays, the Ende people can even be found migrating to Jakarta, the capital of Indonesia.

== See also ==
- Ethnic groups in Indonesia
- Lio people
- Ngada people

== Bibliography ==
- Nakagawa, Satoshi (1993). "Endenese". In Levinson, David (ed.). Encyclopedia of World Cultures. Vol. 5: East and Southeast Asia. Boston: G.K. Hall. pp. 84–86. ISBN 0-8168-8840-X. OCLC 22492614.
