= Jan van den Ende =

Dutch business theorist

Johannes Cornelis Maria (Jan) van den Ende is a Dutch Professor of Management of Technology and Innovation at Rotterdam School of Management at the Erasmus University Rotterdam, and Professor of Management at the Libera Università Internazionale degli Studi Sociali Guido Carli in Rome, Italy. known for his work on product and service development and idea management.

Van den Ende received his MA at the Delft University of Technology in 1978, where he later also obtained his PhD. After several years in industry, he returned to the Delft University of Technology in 1990, where he became Assistant Professor. In 2000 he moved to the Erasmus University Rotterdam, where he was appointed Associate Professor at the Rotterdam School of Management, and in 2007 full Professor of Management of Technology and Innovation.

== Selected publications ==
- Van Den Ende, J., Mulder, K., Knot, M., Moors, E., & Vergragt, P. (1998). "Traditional and modern technology assessment: toward a toolkit." Technological Forecasting and Social Change, 58(1), 5-21.
- Van den Ende, Jan, and René Kemp. "Technological transformations in history: how the computer regime grew out of existing computing regimes." Research Policy 28.8 (1999): 833-851.
- Van Dijk, Christiaan, and Jan Van Den Ende. "Suggestion systems: transferring employee creativity into practicable ideas." R&D Management 32.5 (2002): 387-395.
- Blindenbach-Driessen, Floortje, and Jan van den Ende. "Innovation in project-based firms: The context dependency of success factors." Research Policy 35.4 (2006): 545-561.
- Kijkuit, Bob, and Jan Van Den Ende. "The Organizational Life of an Idea: Integrating Social Network, Creativity and Decision‐Making Perspectives*." Journal of Management Studies 44.6 (2007): 863-882.
