= Ende language (Indonesia) =

Language on Flores island, Indonesia

Ende
- Native to: Indonesia
- Region: central Flores
- Ethnicity: Ende
- Native speakers: 110,000 (2009)
- Language family: Austronesian: Malayo-Polynesian; Central–Eastern; Sumba–Flores; Western Flores; Central Flores; Ende
- Dialects: Maukaro; Nangapanda
- Writing system: Lontara script (Lota Ende variant)

Language codes
- ISO 639-3: end
- Glottolog: ende1246
- Coordinates: 8.71°S 121.56°E

Ende is an Austronesian language spoken in the central part of Flores, one of the Lesser Sunda Islands in the eastern half of Indonesia. It belongs to the Central Flores subgroup.

== Phonology ==
Consonants
		Labial	Alveolar	Palatal	Velar	Glottal
Nasal		m	n		ŋ ⟨ng⟩	
Plosive	voiceless	p	t		k	ʔ ⟨'⟩
Plosive	voiced	b	d		ɡ	
Plosive	prenasalized	ᵐb ⟨mb⟩	ⁿd ⟨nd⟩		ᵑɡ ⟨ngg⟩	
Plosive	implosive	ɓ ⟨bh⟩	ɗ ⟨dh⟩			
Affricate				d͡ʒ ⟨j⟩		
Fricative		f	s		ɣ ⟨gh⟩	(h)
Trill			r			
Lateral			l			
Approximant		w	ɹ ⟨rh⟩			

Vowels
	Front	Central	Back
Close	i		u
Mid	e ⟨é⟩	ə ⟨e⟩	o
Open		a	

== Grammar ==
Like all Central Flores languages, Ende has a highly isolating structure.

== See also ==
- Lio language
- Ende Regency
