= Lio language =

Austronesian language spoken in Flores, Indonesia

Lio
- Li'o
- Sara Li'o
- Native to: Indonesia
- Region: Central Flores
- Ethnicity: Lio
- Native speakers: 220,000 (2009 census)
- Language family: Austronesian: Malayo-Polynesian; Central–Eastern MP; Sumba–Flores; Ende–Manggarai; Central Flores; Lio
- Writing system: Latin script

Language codes
- ISO 639-3: ljl
- Glottolog: lioo1240

Lio (also spelled Li'o) is an Austronesian language spoken in the central part of Flores, one of the Lesser Sunda Islands in the eastern half of Indonesia. It belongs to the Central Flores subgroup.

== Phonology ==
Consonants
		Labial/ labiodental	Dental/ alveolar	Palatal	Velar	Glottal
Nasal		m	n		ŋ ⟨ng⟩	
Plosive	voiceless	p	t̪		k	ʔ ⟨'⟩
Plosive	voiced	b	d		ɡ	
Plosive	prenasalized	ᵐb ⟨mb⟩	ⁿd ⟨nd⟩		ᵑɡ ⟨ngg⟩	
Plosive	implosive	ɓ ⟨bh⟩	ɗ ⟨dh⟩			
Affricate				d͡ʒ ⟨j⟩		
Fricative		f	s		(ɣ)	(h)
Trill			r			
Lateral			l			
Approximant		ʋ ⟨w⟩			ɰ ⟨gh⟩	

Vowels
	Front	Central	Back
Close	i		u
Mid	e	ə	o
Open		a	
