= Ngadha language =

Language in East Nusa Tenggara, Indonesia

Ngadha
- Bahasa Ngadha
- Native to: Indonesia
- Region: Flores
- Ethnicity: Ngada
- Native speakers: (ca. 65,000 cited 1994–1995)
- Language family: Austronesian: Malayo-Polynesian; Central–Eastern MP; Sumba–Flores; Ende–Manggarai; Central Flores; Ngadha–Soʼa; Ngadha

Language codes
- ISO 639-3: Either: nxg – Ngadʼa nea – Eastern Ngadʼa
- Glottolog: ngad1261

Ngadha (IPA: [ŋaᶑa], also spelled Ngada, Ngadʼa or Ngaʼda) is an Austronesian language, one of six languages spoken in the central stretch of the Indonesian island of Flores. From west to east these languages are Ngadha, Nage, Keo, Ende, Lio, and Palu'e. These languages form the proposed Central Flores group of the Sumba–Flores languages, according to Blust (2009).

Djawanai (1983) precises that Ngadha somewhat deviates from Austronesian norms, in that words do not have clear cognates and the grammatical processes are different; for example, the Austronesian family of languages makes an abundant use of prefixes or suffixes (which form new words by adding extensions either before or after root-words, such as [per-]form or child[-hood]), whereas the Ngadha language uses no prefixes or suffixes.

Ngadha is one of the few languages with a retroflex implosive /ᶑ /.

== Phonology ==
The sound system of Ngadha is as follows.

=== Vowels ===
Ngadha vowels
	Front	Central	Back
High	i		u
Mid	e	ə̆	o
Low		a	

The short vowel /ə̆/ is written ⟨e⟩ followed by a double consonant, since phonetically a consonant becomes geminate after /ə̆/. It is never stressed and does not form sequences with other vowels except where glottal stop has dropped (e.g. limaessa 'six', from lima 'five' and 'essa 'one').

Within vowel sequences, epenthetic [j] may appear after an unrounded vowel (e.g. in /eu/, /eo/) and [w] after a rounded vowel (e.g. in /oe/, /oi/). Double vowels are sequences. Vowels tend to be voiceless between voiceless consonants and pre-pausa after voiceless consonants.

Stress is on the penultimate syllable, unless that contains the vowel /ə̆/, in which case stress is on the final syllable.

=== Consonants ===
Ngadha consonants
		Labial	Dental	Alveolar	Palato- alveolar	Retroflex	Velar	Glottal
Nasal		m		n			ŋ	
Plosive/ Affricate	unaspirated	b	d̪		dʒ		ɡ	ʔ
Plosive/ Affricate	aspirated	pʰ		tʰ			kʰ	ʔ
Plosive/ Affricate	implosive	ɓ				ᶑ		
Fricative	voiced	v		z			ɣ	
Fricative	voiceless	f		s			x	
Liquid	lateral			l				
Liquid	trill			r				

The implosives have been spelled ⟨bʼ dʼ⟩, ⟨ʼb ʼd⟩ and ⟨bh dh⟩. The velar fricatives are spelled ⟨h, gh⟩.

The trill is short, and may have only one or two contacts.

In initial position, there is a distinction between the glottal stop and zero (no consonant), as in inu 'drink' vs. 'inu 'tiny'. In rapid speech the glottal stop tends to drop between vowels.

Phonetically [#C̩CV] words are analyzed from a phonological point of view as having an initial schwa. Such words always have a voiced initial consonant; before an voiceless consonant, the initial schwa is pronounced. Examples are emma [mma] 'father', emmu [mmu] 'mosquito', enna [nna] 'sand', Ennga [ŋŋa] (name), ebba [bba] 'swaddling sling', ebbu [bbu] 'grandparents', Ebbo [bbo] (name), erro [rro] 'sun'. In medial position, the schwa can drop out even before voiceless consonants, as in limaessa [limassa] 'six'.
