= Manggarai language =

Austronesian language spoken in Flores, Indonesia

Manggarai
- tombo Manggarai
- Native to: Indonesia
- Region: Western Flores; Rinca Island
- Ethnicity: Manggarai
- Native speakers: (undated figure of 900,000)
- Language family: Austronesian: Malayo-Polynesian; Central–Eastern MP; Sumba–Flores; Ende–Manggarai; Manggarai–Rembong; Manggarai
- Dialects: Mukun; Kisol; Lambaleda; Ruteng cancar Kolang; Lembor; Kempo dialect Lengko; Boleng
- Writing system: Latin

Language codes
- ISO 639-3: mqy
- Glottolog: mang1405 Manggarai

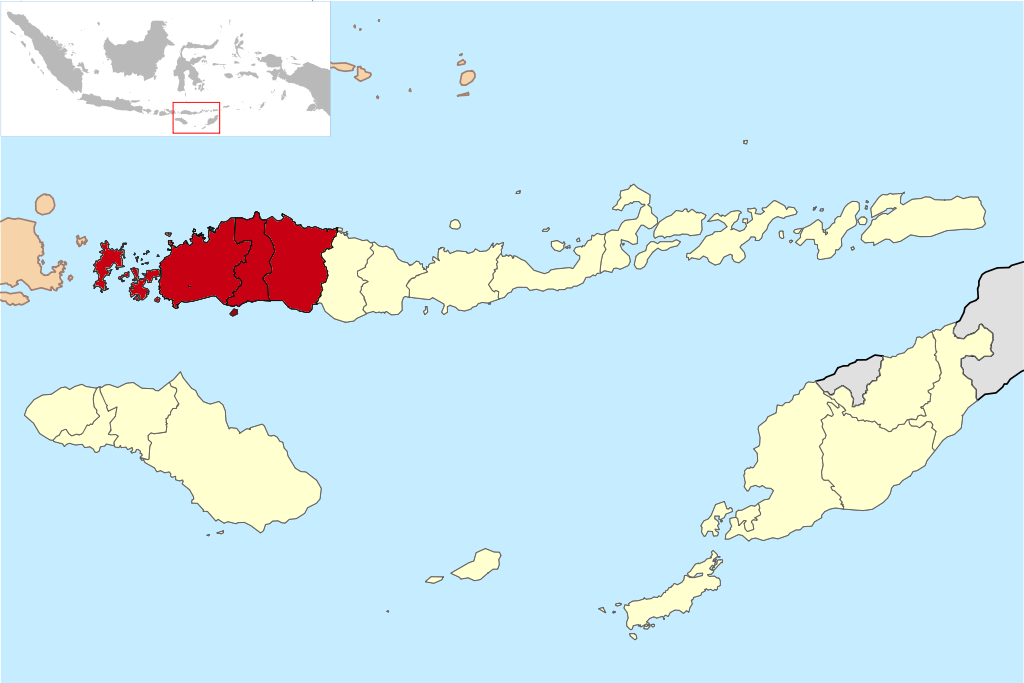
Location map of the regency of Greater Manggarai, which consists of three regencies: Manggarai Regency, West Manggarai Regency and East Manggarai Regency, on Flores island, in East Nusa Tenggara Province, Indonesia

The Manggarai language (tombo Manggarai, Indonesian: bahasa Manggarai) is the language of the Manggarai people from the western parts of the island of Flores, in East Nusa Tenggara Province, Indonesia.

== Background ==
Manggarai is the native language of the Manggarai people of Flores island in East Nusa Tenggara province, Indonesia. Based on statistical data reported by the Central Agency on Statistics (BPS) in 2009, it is the native language of more than 730,000 people in the province of East Nusa Tenggara, Indonesia. (Note: This data include statistics for the population of the Regency of Greater Manggarai on Flores island, which consists of three districts: Manggarai district, West Manggarai district, and East Manggarai district.)

Outside Flores, there was once a small minority of Manggarai-speaking people in the village of Manggarai located in the eastern part of Jakarta, the capital city of Indonesia. Formerly a neighbourhood in the capital with a large concentration of transmigrant workers from the Greater Manggarai region of Nusa Tenggara Timur, the neighbourhood's populace today from the said area has been decreasing (due to factors such as return to their ancestral village, intermarriage with different ethnic groups, etc.) for it is now populated by the majority native Betawi ethnic group.

The Manggarai language is part of the Austronesian family, and is therefore related to Indonesian and other Malay varieties. Most speakers of Manggarai also speak Indonesian for official and commercial purposes and to communicate with non-Manggarai Indonesians (including citizens of the same province from different diverse ethnic groups). Riung is often considered a dialect of Maranggai or a separate language. In addition, languages such as Kepoʼ, Manus, Rajong, Rembong, and Wae Rana are also sometimes considered Manggarai dialects.

== Phonology ==
=== Consonants ===
Consonant phonemes
		Labial	Alveolar	Palatal	Velar	Glottal
Plosive/ Affricate	voiceless	p	t	tʃ	k	ʔ
Plosive/ Affricate	voiced	b	d	dʒ	ɡ	
Plosive/ Affricate	prenasal vl.	ᵐp	ⁿt	ⁿtʃ	ᵑk	
Plosive/ Affricate	prenasal vd.	ᵐb	ⁿd	ⁿdʒ	ᵑɡ	
Nasal		m	n		ŋ	
Fricative		v	s			h
Lateral			l			
Trill			r			
Approximant				j		

=== Vowels ===
Vowel phonemes
	Front	Central	Back
Close	i		u
Mid	e	ə	o
Open		a	
