= Kepo =

Kepo or KEPO may refer to:

- Kepo language, a Malayo-Polynesian language
- Ati Kepo (born 1996), Papua New Guinean footballer
- Kolu Kepo (born 1993), Papua New Guinean footballer
- KTSM (AM), previously KEPO, a radio station licensed to El Paso, Texas, US

== See also ==
- Kepos, a town of ancient Thrace
