= MQY =

MQY or mqy may refer to:

- MQY, the IATA and FAA LID code for Smyrna Airport (Tennessee), Tennessee, United States
- mqy, the ISO 639-3 code for Manggarai language, Indonesia
