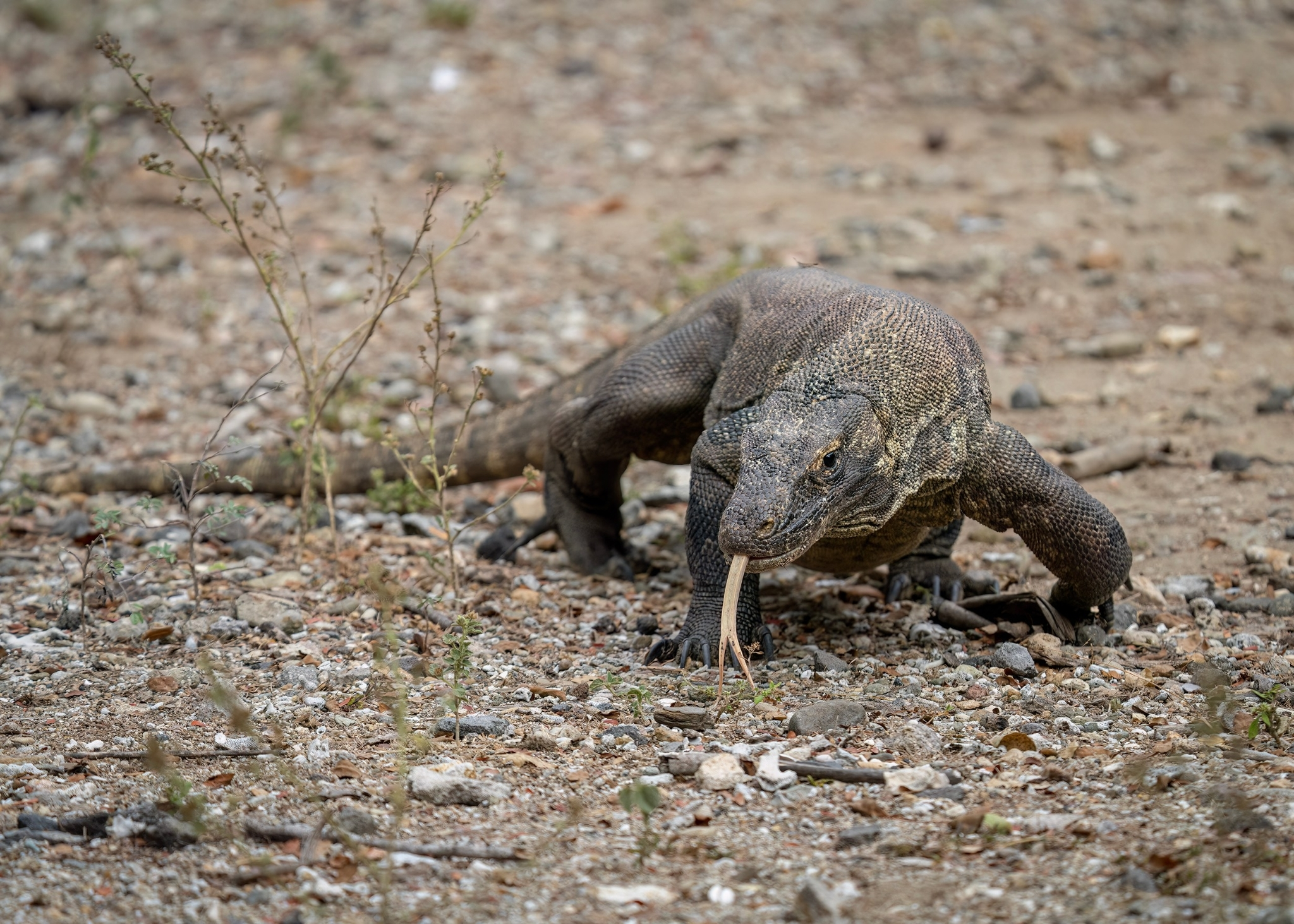
- Komodo National Park, Indonesia

Conservation status
- Endangered (IUCN 3.1)
- CITES Appendix I

Scientific classification
- Kingdom: Animalia
- Phylum: Chordata
- Class: Reptilia
- Order: Squamata
- Suborder: Anguimorpha
- Family: Varanidae
- Genus: Varanus
- Subgenus: Varanus
- Species: V. komodoensis

Binomial name
- Varanus komodoensis Ouwens, 1912
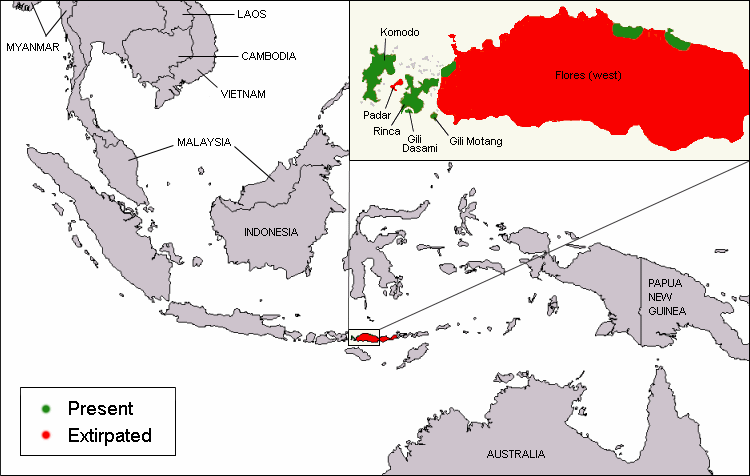
- Komodo dragon distribution

= Komodo dragon =

Komodo dragon Temporal range: Pliocene–Holocene, 3.8–0 Ma

Largest living species of lizard

The Komodo dragon (Varanus komodoensis), also known as the Komodo monitor, is a large reptile of the monitor lizard family Varanidae that is endemic to the Indonesian islands of Komodo, Rinca, Flores, Gili Dasami, and Gili Motang. The largest extant population lives within the Komodo National Park in Eastern Indonesia. It is the largest extant species of lizard, with the males growing to a maximum length of 3 m (10 ft) and weighing up to 150 kg (330 lb).

As a result of their size, which is exceptional among reptiles, Komodo dragons are apex predators, dominating the ecosystems in which they live. Komodo dragons hunt and ambush prey; juveniles take small prey like invertebrates or birds, and adults favour larger mammals, occasionally even attacking humans. The diet of adult Komodo dragons mainly consists of Javan rusa and feral pigs, though they also eat considerable amounts of carrion.

Young Komodo dragons are vulnerable and dwell in trees to avoid predators, including cannibalistic adults, which young Komodo dragons also try to repel by rolling in feces. They take 8 to 11 years to mature and are estimated to live up to 30 years (or by some estimates as much as 62 years). Mating begins between May and August, and the eggs are laid in September; as many as 20 eggs are deposited at a time in an abandoned megapode nest or in a self-dug nesting hole. The eggs are incubated for seven to eight months, hatching in April, when insects are most plentiful.

Western scientists first recorded Komodo dragons in 1910. Their large size and fearsome reputation make them popular zoo exhibits. In the wild, their range has been reduced by human encroachment and is likely to contract further from the effects of climate change; hence, they are listed as Endangered by the IUCN Red List. They are protected under Indonesian law, and the Komodo National Park was founded in 1980 to aid protection efforts.

== Names ==
To the natives of Komodo Island, it is referred to as ora, buaya darat ('land crocodile'), or biawak raksasa ('giant monitor'). In the Komodo language, the dragons are also called sebae 'twins' out of a traditional belief by the Komodo people that they share the same spiritual mother as the dragons. Meanwhile, the Baar people, who speak the Baar dialect of Riung language, call the Komodo dragon mbau.

The Komodo dragon was named by W. Douglas Burden, leader of an American expedition to Komodo Island in 1926. It is also sometimes known as the Komodo monitor or the Komodo Island monitor in scientific literature, although these names are uncommon.

== Taxonomy ==
Komodo dragons were first documented by Europeans in 1910, when rumors of a "land crocodile" reached Lieutenant van Steyn van Hensbroek of the Dutch colonial administration. Widespread notoriety came after 1912, when Peter Ouwens, the director of the Zoological Museum of Bogor, Java, published a paper on the topic after receiving a photo and a skin from the lieutenant, as well as two other specimens from a collector.

The first two live Komodo dragons to arrive in Europe were exhibited in the Reptile House at London Zoo when it opened in 1927. Joan Beauchamp Procter made some of the earliest observations of these animals in captivity and she demonstrated their behaviour at a scientific meeting of the Zoological Society of London in 1928.

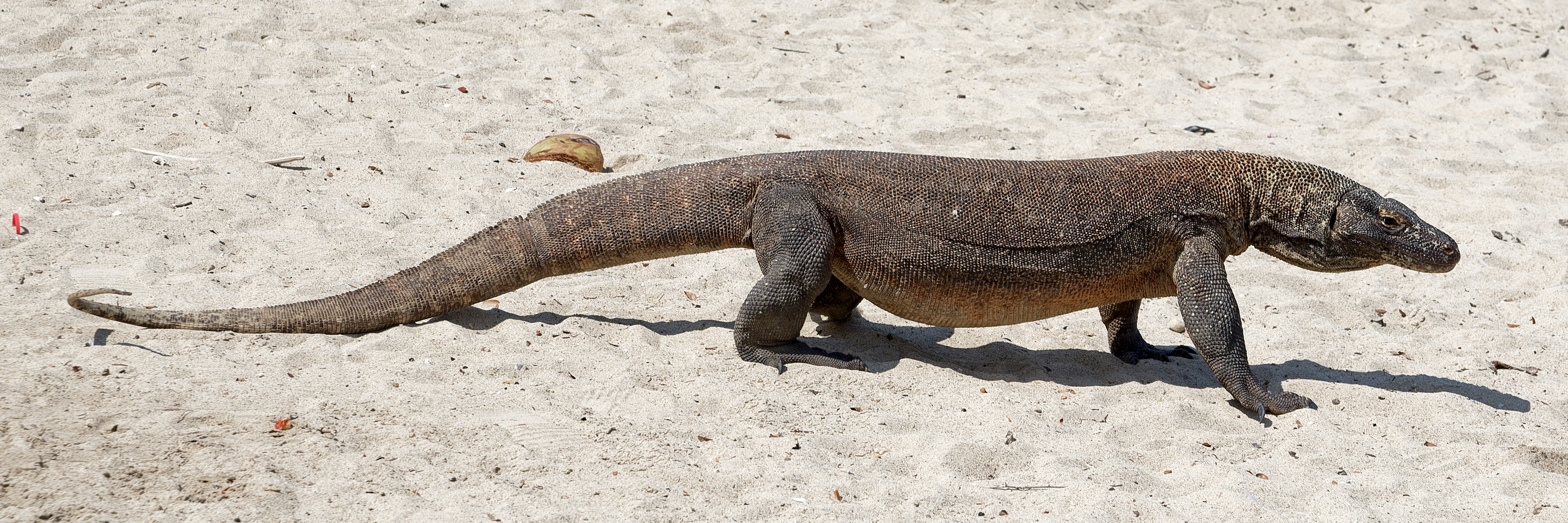
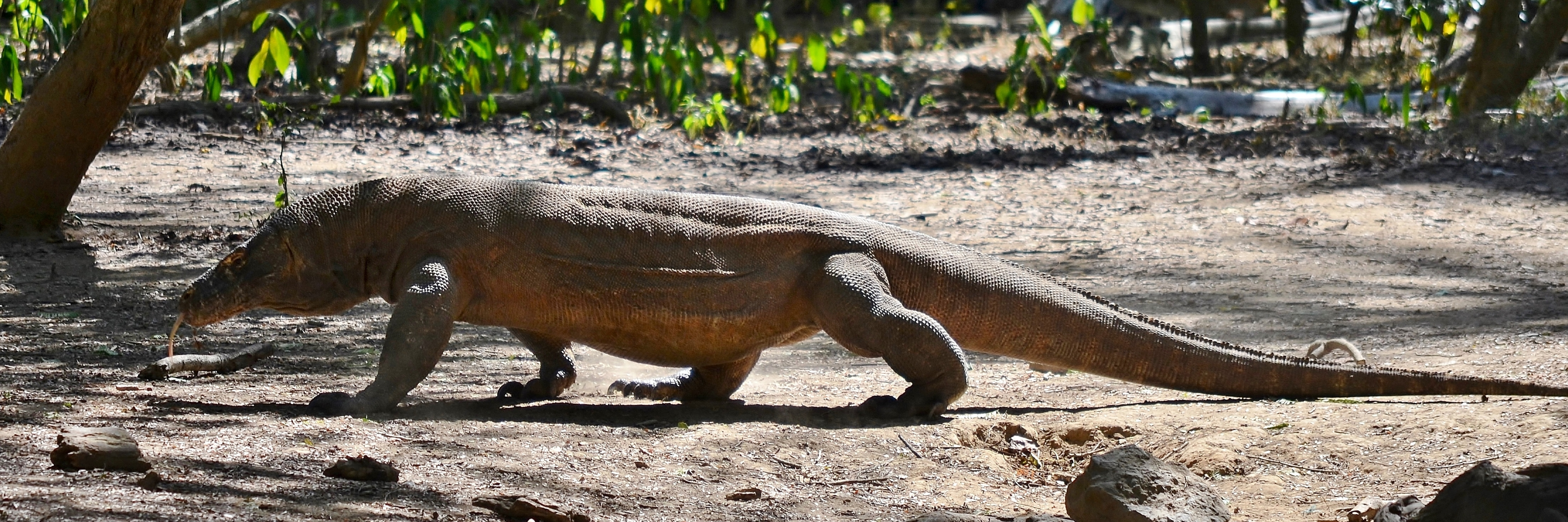
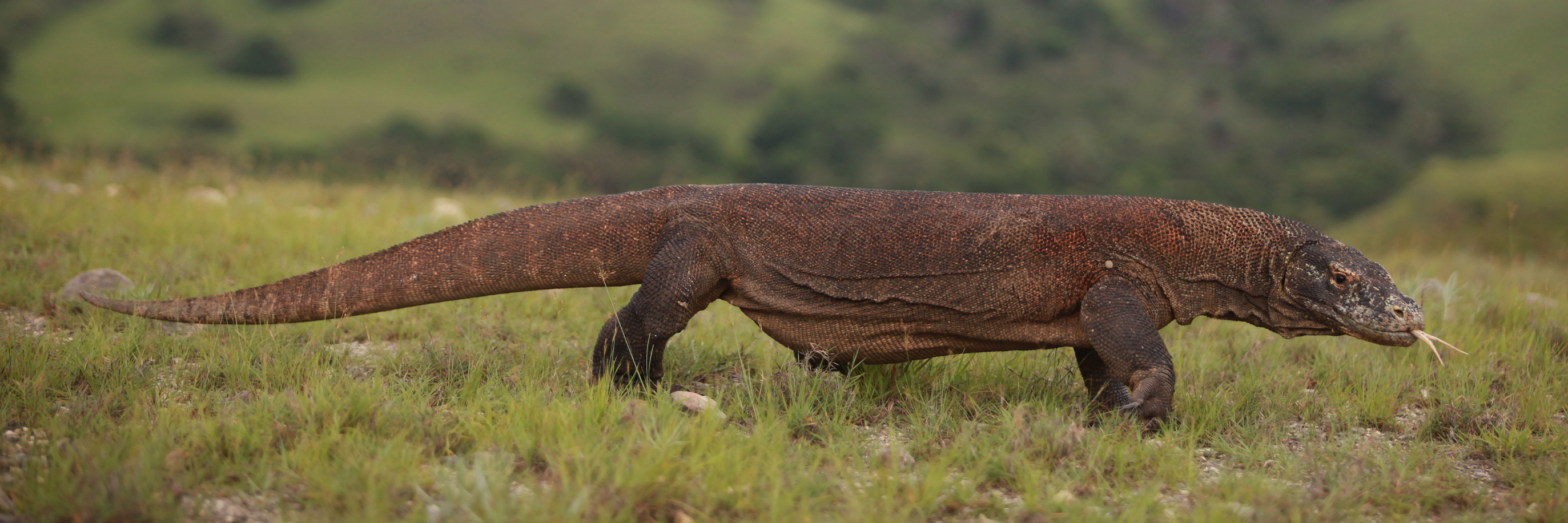
In Komodo National Park

The Komodo dragon was the driving factor for an expedition to Komodo Island by W. Douglas Burden in 1926. After returning with 12 preserved specimens and two live ones, this expedition provided the inspiration for the 1933 movie King Kong. Three of his specimens were stuffed and are still on display in the American Museum of Natural History.

The Dutch island administration, realizing the limited number of individuals in the wild, soon outlawed sport hunting and heavily limited the number of individuals taken for scientific study. Collecting expeditions ground to a halt with the occurrence of World War II, not resuming until the 1950s and 1960s, when studies examined the Komodo dragon's feeding behavior, reproduction, and body temperature. At around this time, an expedition was planned in which a long-term study of the Komodo dragon would be undertaken. This task was given to the Auffenberg family, who stayed on Komodo Island for 11 months in 1969. During their stay, Walter Auffenberg and his assistant Putra Sastrawan captured and tagged more than 50 Komodo dragons.

Research from the Auffenberg expedition proved enormously influential in raising Komodo dragons in captivity. Research after that of the Auffenberg family has shed more light on the nature of the Komodo dragon, with biologists such as Claudio Ciofi continuing to study the creatures.

=== Evolutionary history ===
Genetic analysis of mitochondrial DNA shows the Komodo dragon to be the closest relative (sister taxon) of the Australian lace monitor (V. varius), with their common ancestor diverging from a lineage that gave rise to the crocodile monitor (Varanus salvadorii) of New Guinea. A 2021 study showed that during the late Miocene, the ancestors of Komodo dragons had hybridized with the common ancestor of Australian sand monitors (V. spenceri, V. gouldii, V. rosenbergi and V. panoptes).

Fossils from across Queensland demonstrate that the Komodo dragon was once present in Australia, with fossils spanning from the Early Pliocene (~3.8 million years ago) to the Middle Pleistocene, with the youngest confirmed records of the species in Australia dating to at latest 330,000 years ago. In Australia, it coexisted with the even larger monitor species Varanus priscus also known as megalania, the largest terrestrial lizard ever. The oldest records of the Komodo dragon on Flores date to around 1.4 million years ago, during the Early Pleistocene. Additionally, Pleistocene fossils of Varanus found in Java and Timor may belong to the Komodo dragon.

== Description ==
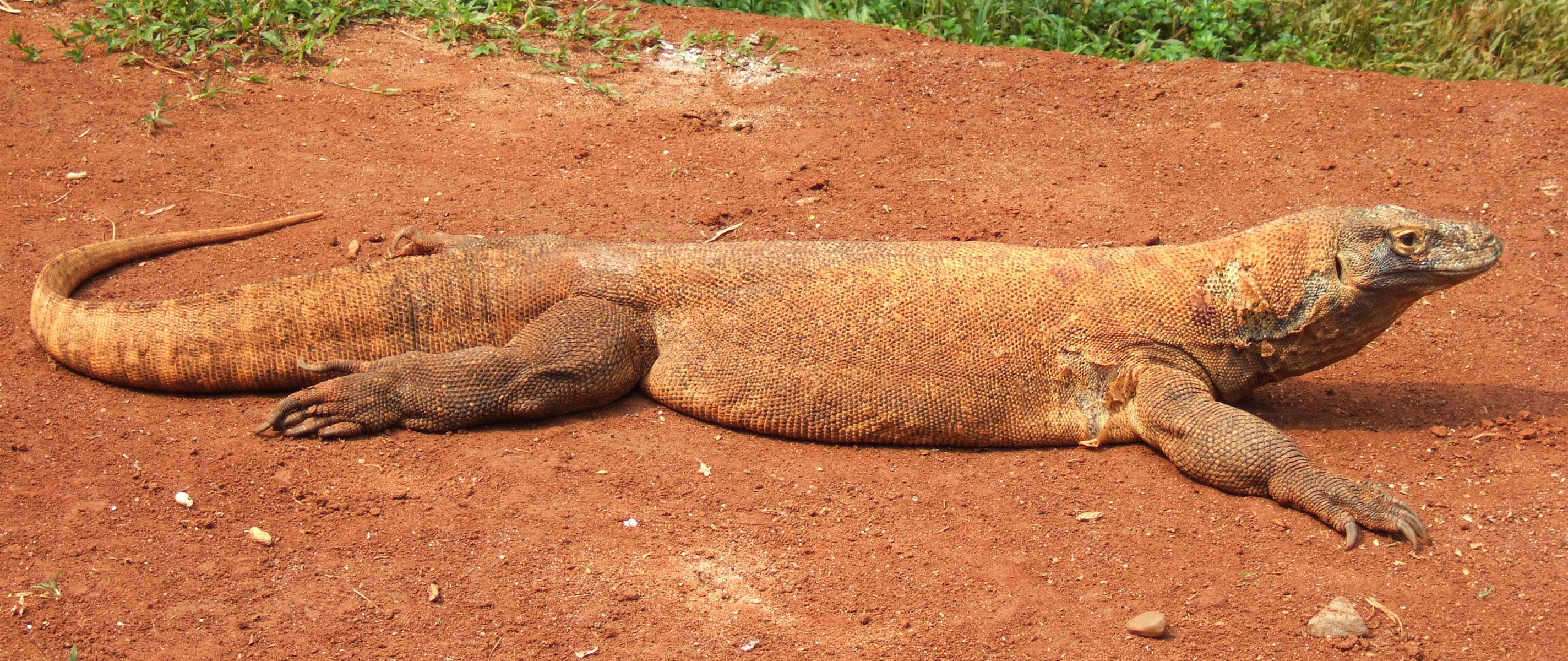
Adult

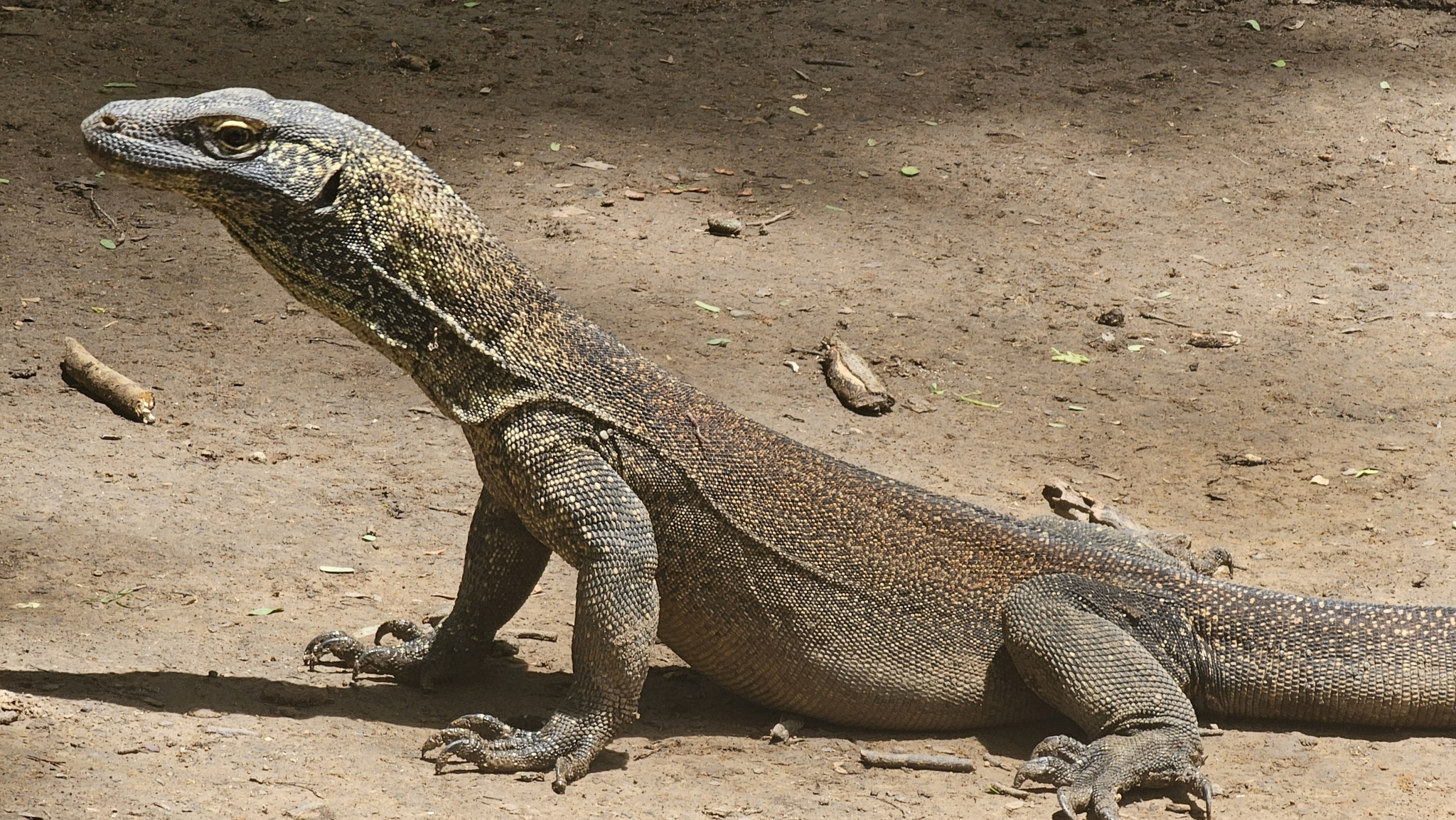
Juvenile

In the wild, adult Komodo dragons usually weigh around 70 kg (150 lb), although captive specimens often weigh more. According to Guinness World Records, an average adult male will weigh 79 to 91 kg (174 to 201 lb) and measure 2.59 m (8.5 ft), while an average female will weigh 68 to 73 kg (150 to 161 lb) and measure 2.29 m (7.5 ft). The largest verified specimen in captivity was 3.1–3.13 m (10 ft 2 in – 10 ft 3 in) long and weighed 166 kg (366 lb), including its undigested food. The largest wild specimen had a length 3.04 m (10 ft), a snout-vent length (SVL) 1.54 m (5 ft 1 in) and a mass of 81.5 kg (180 lb) excluding stomach contents. The heaviest reached a mass of 87.4 kg (193 lb). The study noted that weights greater than 100 kg (220 lb) were possible but only after the animal had consumed a large meal.

The Komodo dragon has a tail as long as its body, as well as about 60 frequently replaced, serrated teeth that can measure up to 2.5 cm (1 in) in length. Its saliva is frequently blood-tinged because its teeth are almost completely covered by gingival tissue that is naturally lacerated during feeding. It also has a long, yellow, deeply forked tongue.

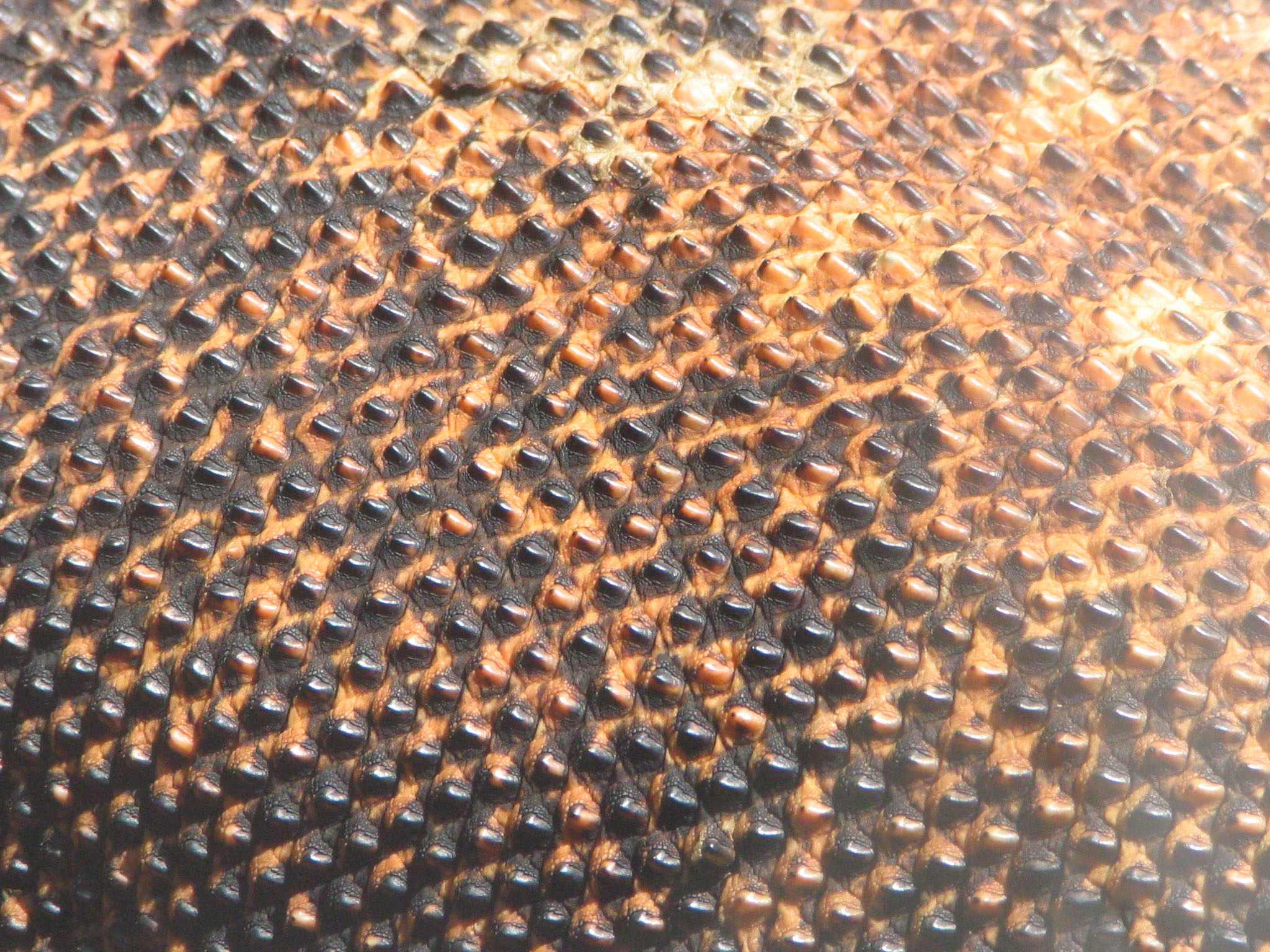
Closeup of the skin

Like many other monitors species, Komodo dragon skin is reinforced by armoured scales, which contain tiny bones called osteoderms that function as a sort of natural chain-mail. The only areas lacking osteoderms on the head of the adult Komodo dragon are around the eyes, nostrils, mouth margins, and parietal eye, a light-sensing organ on the top of the head. Where lizards typically have one or two varying patterns or shapes of osteoderms, Komodos have four: rosette, platy, dendritic, and vermiform. This rugged hide makes Komodo dragon skin a poor source of leather. Additionally, these osteoderms become more extensive and variable in shape as the Komodo dragon ages, ossifying more extensively as the lizard grows. These osteoderms are absent in hatchlings and juveniles, indicating that the natural armor develops as a product of age and competition between adults for protection in intraspecific combat over food and mates.

== Morphology ==
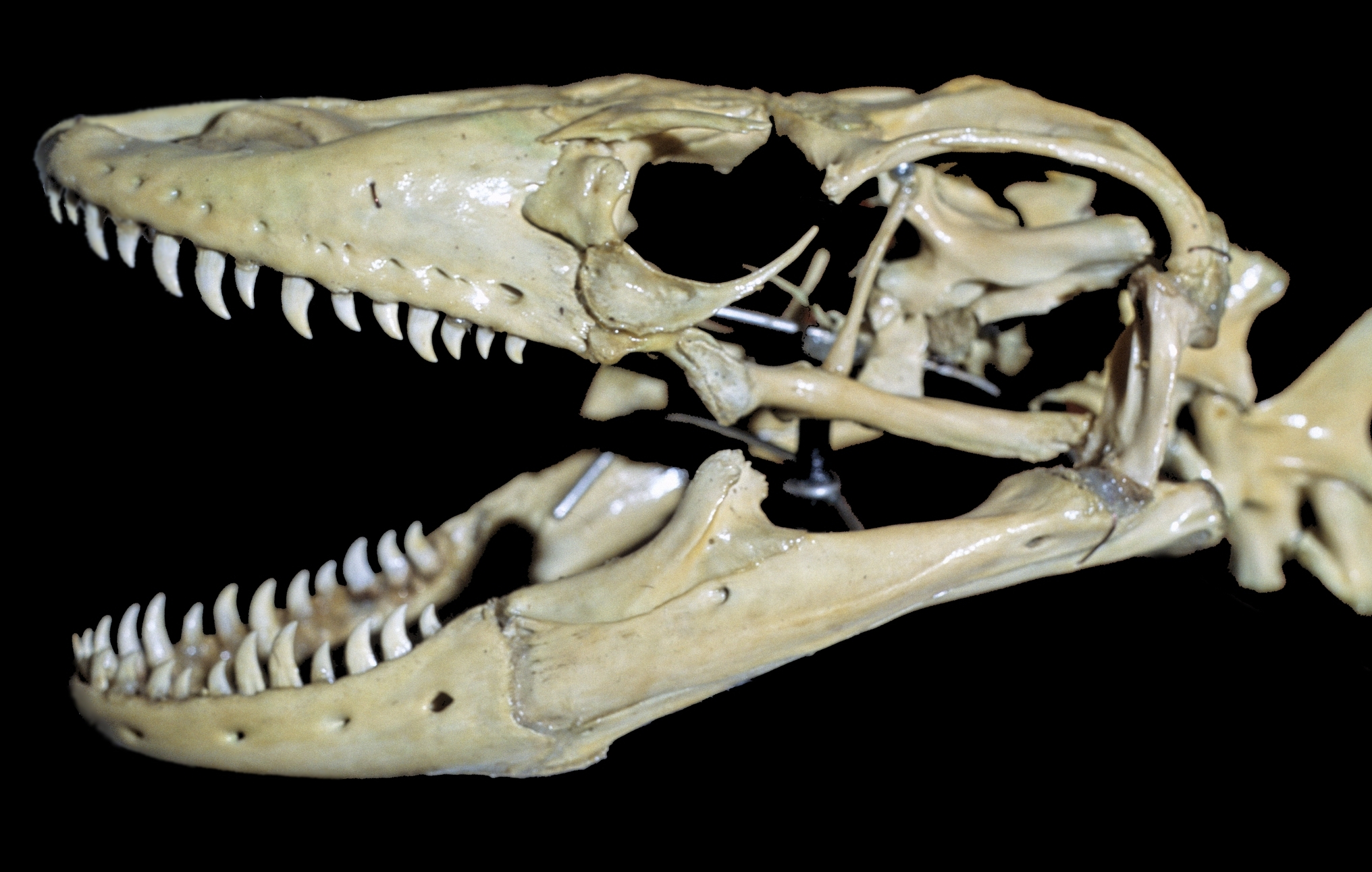
Skull of a Komodo dragon

=== Dentition ===
Komodo dragons have ziphodont teeth, which are defined as teeth that are laterally flattened, recurved, and with serrated tooth crowns where the serrations have a dentine core and a very thin enamel outer layer. This is the same type of dentition observed in many extinct theropod dinosaurs. The teeth of the insectivorous juveniles in contrast are barely recurved, with fewer and less well-developed serrations that lack dentine cores.

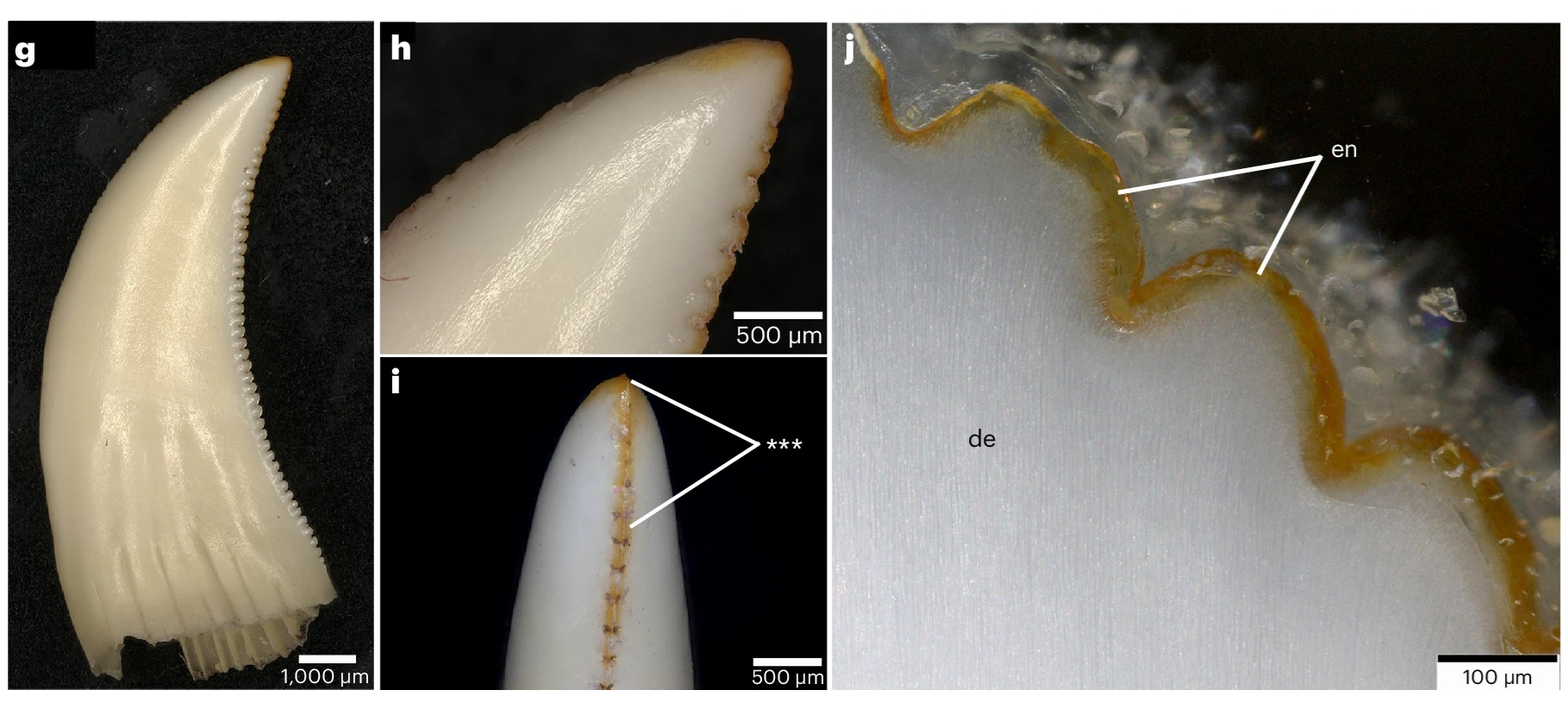
Teeth, showing the orange, iron-enriched enamel serrations.

A 2024 study published in Nature Ecology & Evolution found that Komodo dragons have orange, iron-enriched coatings on their tooth serrations and tips, as an adaptation for maintaining the sharp cutting edges. This feature is also observed to a lesser degree in a few other Australasian to Asian monitor species, though notably absent in a few other species from that range.

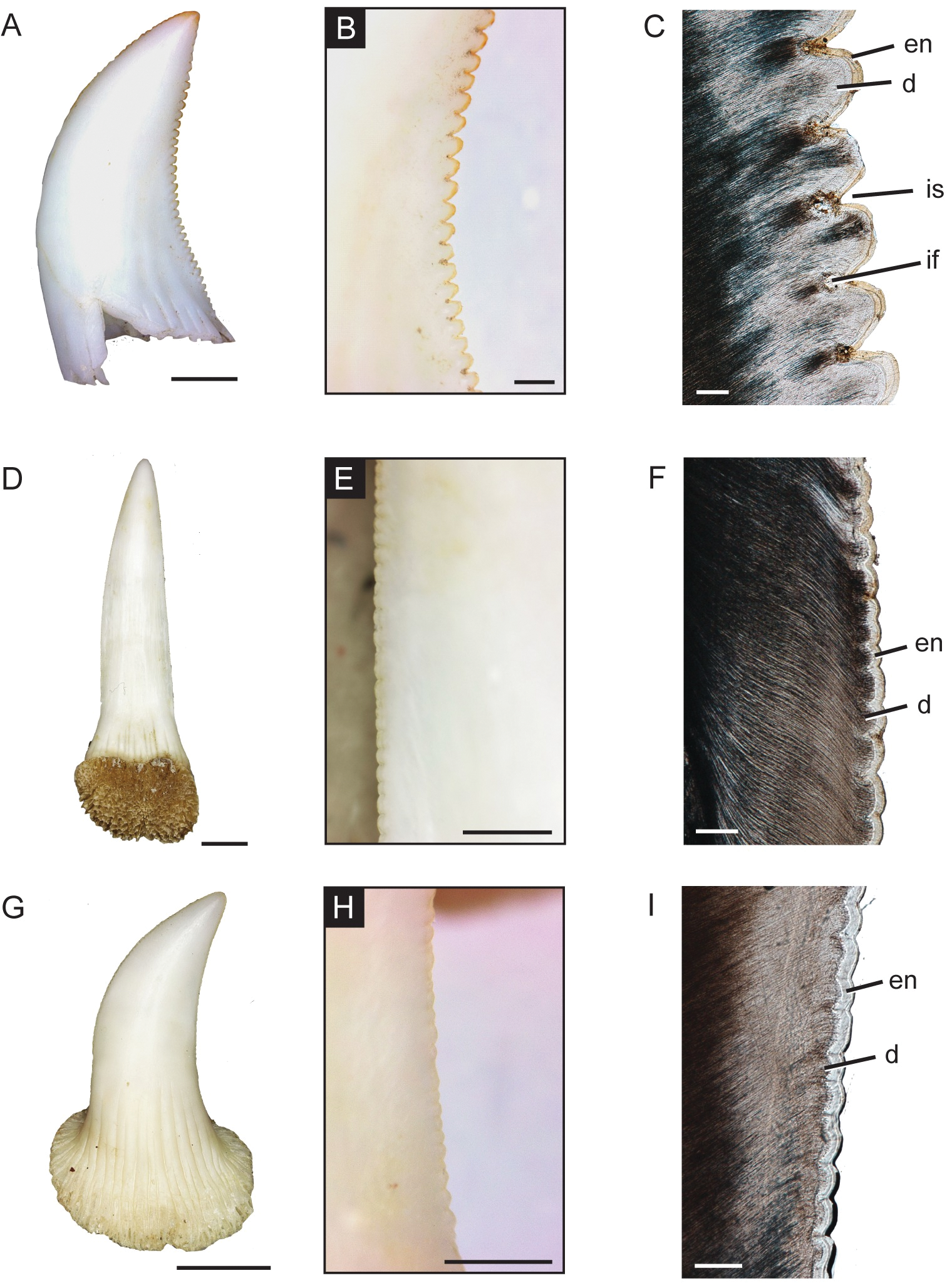
Teeth. Komodo dragon (A-C), crocodile monitor (D-F), Asian water monitor (G-I).

Teeth are quickly replaced every 40 days, while maintaining up to 5 replacement teeth for each tooth position at any given time. This high rate of replacement and large number of replacement teeth is similar to that of the crocodile monitor. Many other monitor species as well as Chinese crocodile lizards and beaded lizards only have 1-2 replacement teeth behind each tooth position.

=== Senses ===
As with other varanids, Komodo dragons have only a single ear bone, the stapes, for transferring vibrations from the tympanic membrane to the cochlea. This arrangement means they are likely restricted to sounds in the 400 to 2,000 hertz range, compared to humans who hear between 20 and 20,000 hertz. They were formerly thought to be deaf when a study reported no agitation in wild Komodo dragons in response to whispers, raised voices, or shouts. This was disputed when London Zoo employee Joan Procter trained a captive specimen to come out to feed at the sound of her voice, even when she could not be seen.

Komodo dragons have well-developed daytime vision and can see objects as far away as 300 m (980 ft), but because its retinas only contain cones, it is thought to have poor night vision. It can distinguish colours, but has poor visual discrimination of stationary objects.

Komodo dragon using its tongue to sample the air

As with many other reptiles, the Komodo dragon primarily relies on its tongue to detect, taste, and smell stimuli, with the vomeronasal sense using the Jacobson's organ, rather than using the nostrils. With the help of a favorable wind and its habit of swinging its head from side to side as it walks, a Komodo dragon may be able to detect carrion from 4–9.5 km (2.5–5.9 mi) away. Their tongue-flicking behavior is similar to that of snakes. It only has a few taste buds in the back of its throat. Its scales, some of which are reinforced with bone, have sensory plaques connected to nerves to facilitate its sense of touch. The scales around the ears, lips, chin, and soles of the feet may have three or more sensory plaques.

== Behaviour and ecology ==
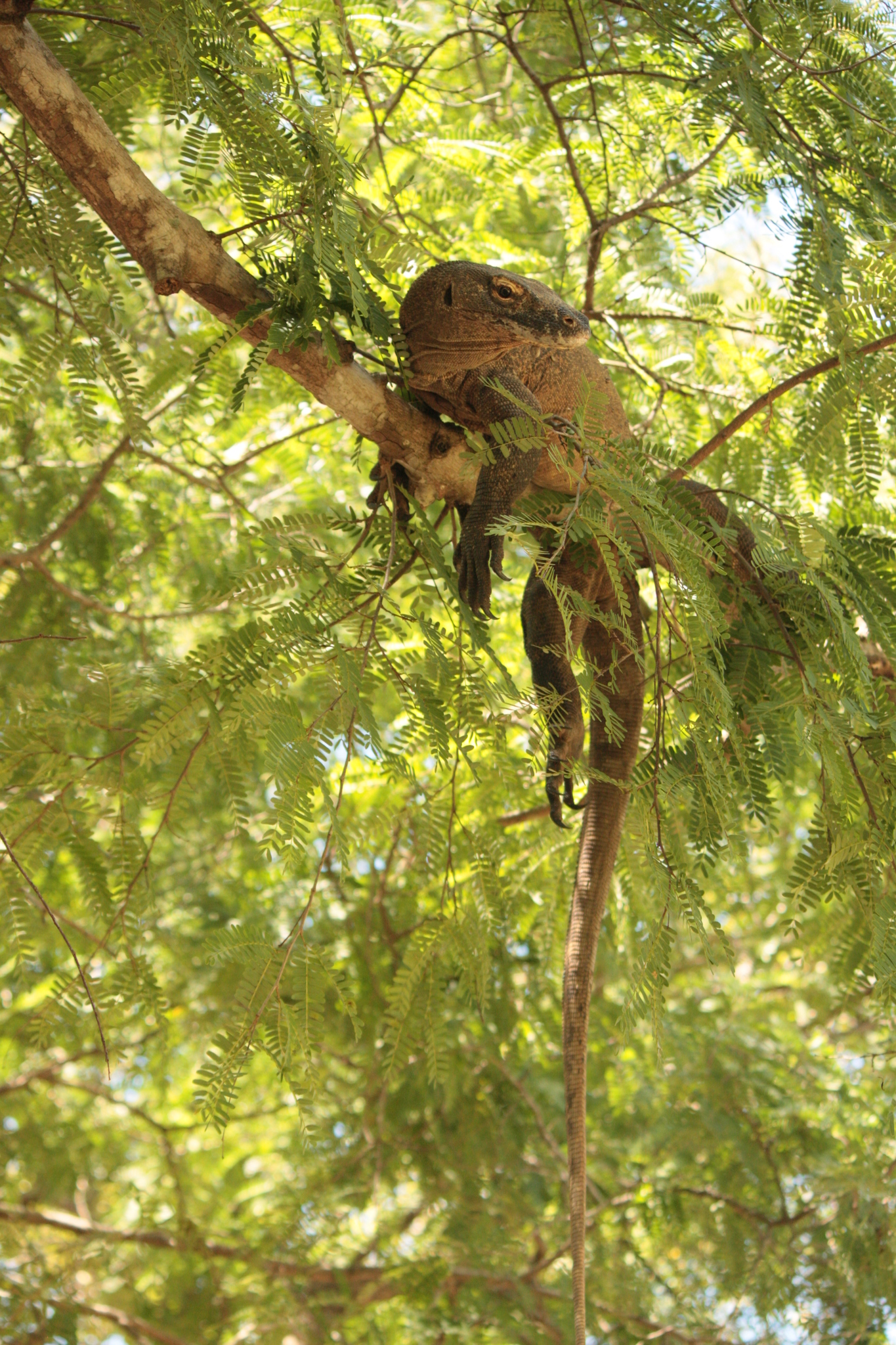
Juvenile Komodo dragon in a tree

The Komodo dragon prefers hot and dry places and typically lives in dry, open grassland, savanna, and tropical forest at low elevations. As an ectotherm, it is most active in the day, although it exhibits some nocturnal activity. Komodo dragons are solitary, coming together only to breed and eat. There are some "personality" differences among the species, where some present as more "shy", particularly females. They are capable of running rapidly in brief sprints up to 20 km/h (12 mph), diving up to 4.5 m (15 ft), and climbing trees proficiently when young through use of their strong claws. To catch out-of-reach prey, the Komodo dragon may stand on its hind legs and use its tail as a support. As it matures, its claws are used primarily as weapons, as its great size makes climbing impractical.

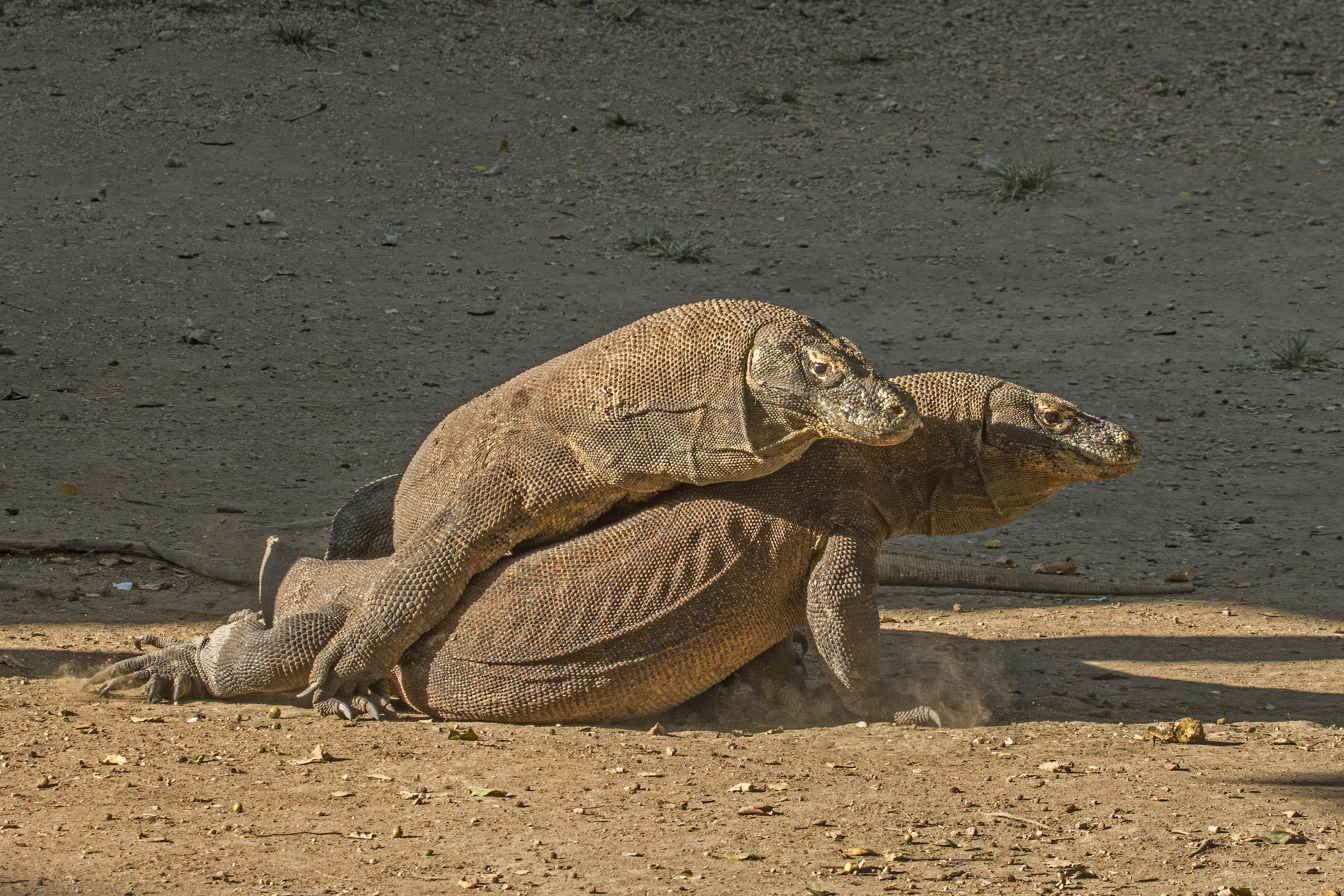

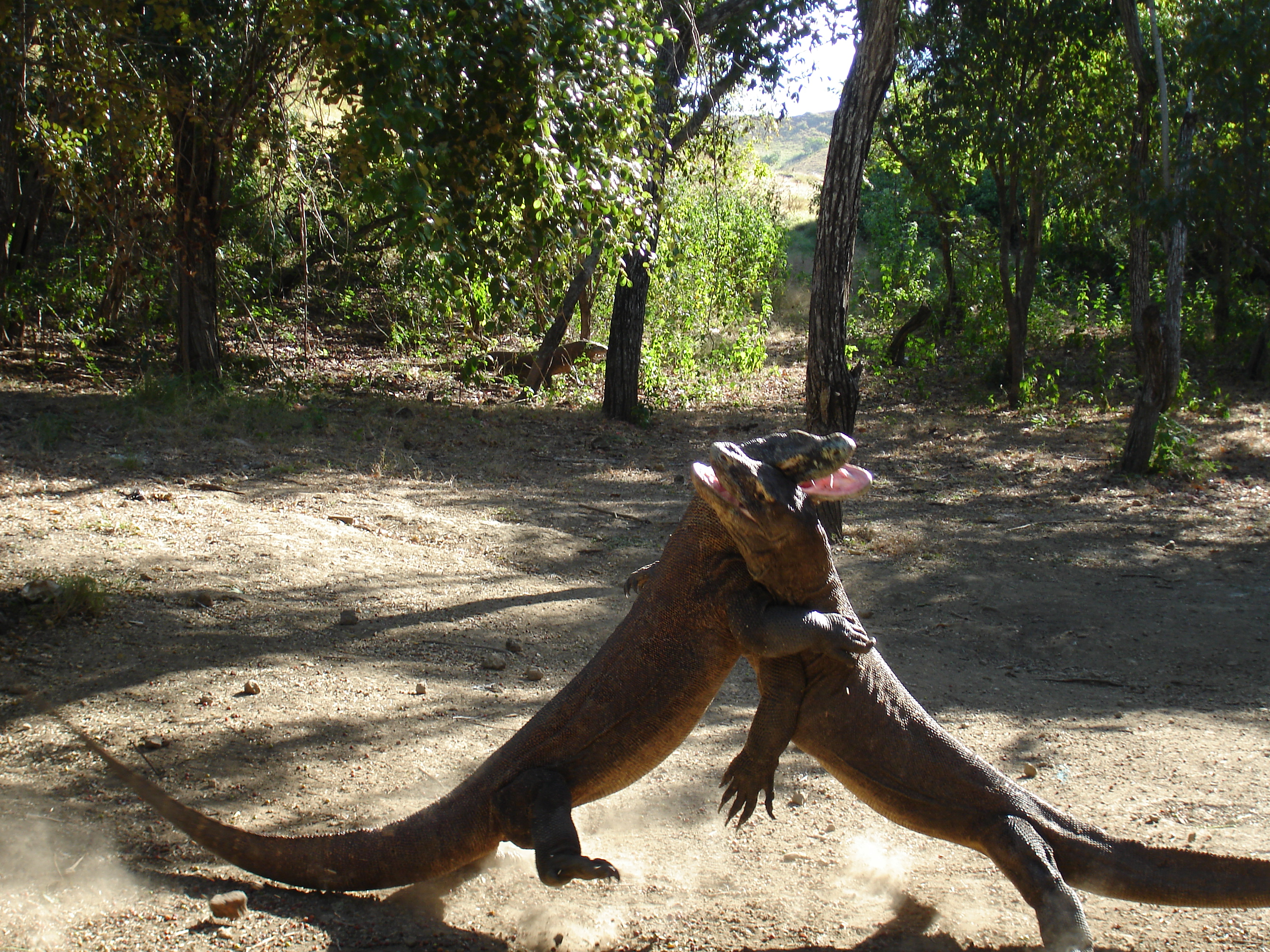
Males fighting

For shelter, the Komodo dragon digs holes that can measure from 1 to 3 m (3.3 to 9.8 ft) wide with its powerful forelimbs and claws. Because of its large size and habit of sleeping in these burrows, it is able to conserve body heat throughout the night and minimise its basking period the morning after. The Komodo dragon stays in the shade during the hottest part of the day and hunts in the afternoon. These special resting places, usually located on ridges with cool sea breezes, are marked with droppings and are cleared of vegetation. They serve as strategic locations from which to ambush deer.

=== Diet ===
Komodo dragons are apex predators. They are carnivores; older views considered them as eating mostly carrion, but newer research has found they will frequently ambush live prey with a stealthy approach. When suitable prey arrives near a dragon's ambush site, it will suddenly charge at the animal at high speeds and go for the underside or the throat. The majority of the extant Komodo dragon population's diet is made up of introduced ungulates, such as deer, pigs, and buffalo.

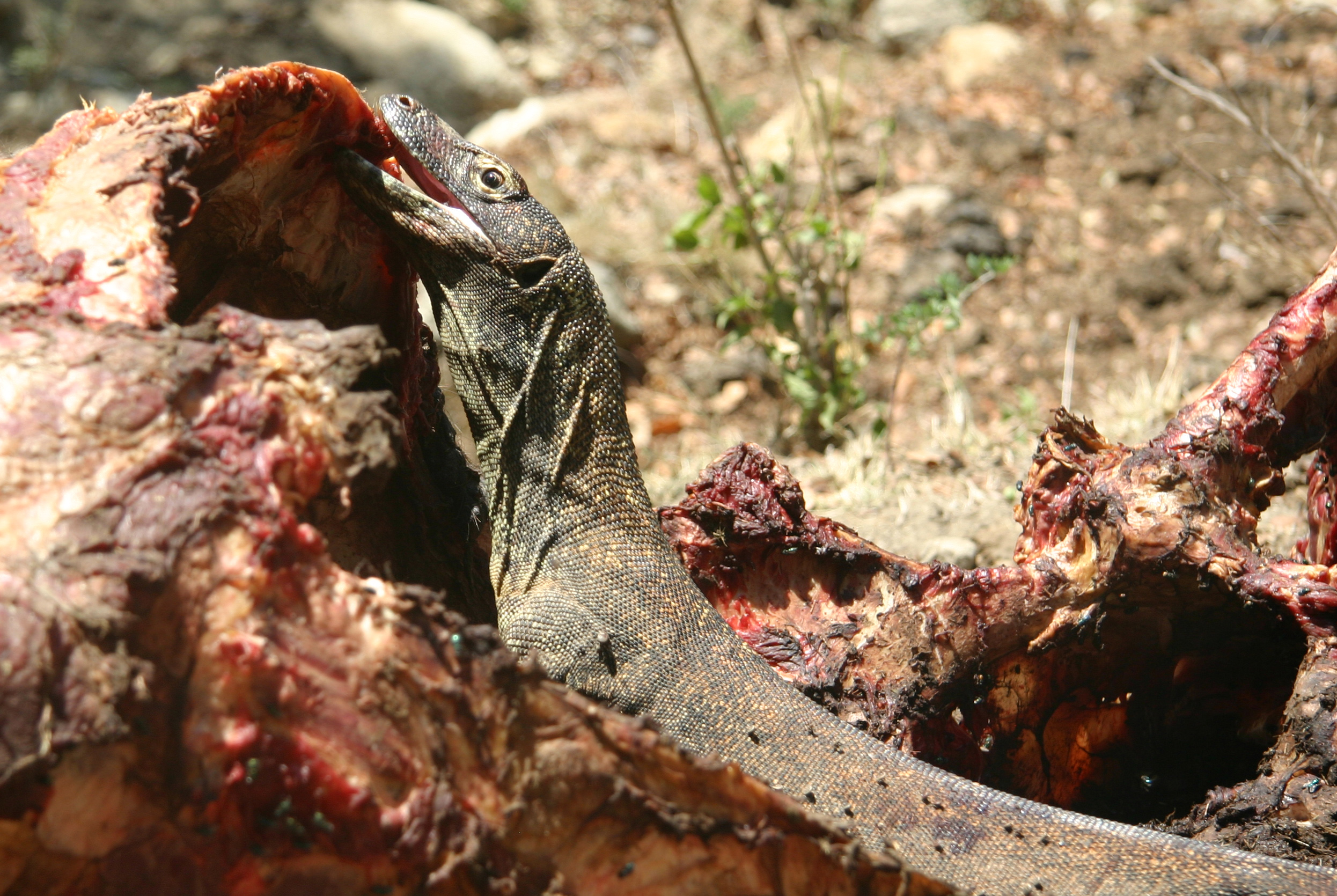
Komodo dragon on Rinca feeding on a water buffalo corpse

Contrary to older claims, Komodo dragons do not deliberately allow the prey to escape with fatal injuries, but try to kill prey outright on the spot using a combination of lacerating damage and blood loss. They have been recorded as killing wild pigs within seconds, and alleged observations of Komodo dragons tracking prey for long distances are likely misinterpreted cases of failed predation where the prey fully escaped an attack before succumbing to infected wounds.

Komodo dragons eat by tearing large chunks of flesh and swallowing them whole while holding the carcass down with their forelegs. For smaller prey up to the size of a goat, their loosely articulated jaws, flexible skulls, and expandable stomachs allow them to swallow prey whole. The undigested vegetable contents of a prey animal's stomach and intestines are typically avoided. Copious amounts of red saliva the Komodo dragons produce help to lubricate the food, but swallowing is still a long process (15–20 minutes to swallow a goat). A Komodo dragon may attempt to speed up the process by ramming the carcass against a tree to force it down its throat, sometimes ramming so forcefully that the tree is knocked down. A small tube under the tongue that connects to the lungs allows it to breathe while swallowing.

After eating up to 80% of its body mass in one meal, it drags itself to a sunny location to speed digestion, as the food could rot and poison the dragon if left undigested in its stomach for too long. Because of their slow metabolism, large dragons can survive on as few as 12 meals a year. After digestion, the Komodo dragon regurgitates a mass of horns, hair, and teeth known as the gastric pellet, which is covered in malodorous mucus. After regurgitating the gastric pellet, it rubs its face in the dirt or on bushes to get rid of the mucus.

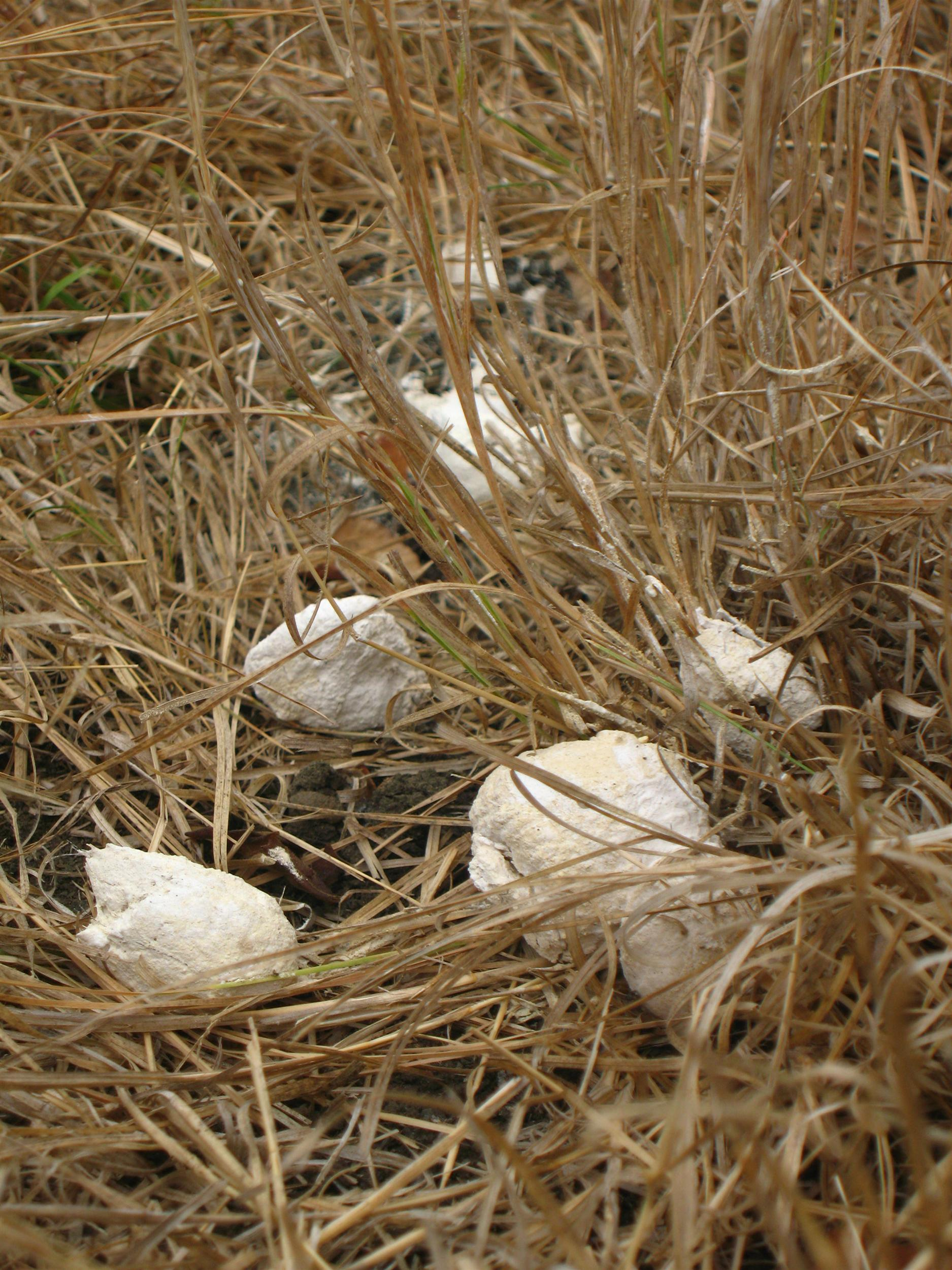
Komodo excrement has a dark portion, which is stool, and a whitish portion, which is urate, the nitrogenous end-product of their digestion process

The eating habits of Komodo dragons follow a hierarchy, with the larger animals generally eating before the smaller ones. The largest male typically asserts his dominance and the smaller males show their submission by use of body language and rumbling hisses. Dragons of equal size may resort to "wrestling". Losers usually retreat, though they have been known to be killed and eaten by victors.

The Komodo dragon's diet varies depending on stage of growth. Young Komodo dragons will eat insects, birds and bird's eggs and small reptiles, while larger Komodo dragons (typically over 20 kg (44 lb)) prefer large ungulate prey, such as Javan rusa deer, wild pigs and water buffalo. Occasionally, they attack and bite humans. Sometimes they consume human corpses, digging up bodies from shallow graves. This habit of raiding graves caused the villagers of Komodo to move their graves from sandy to clay ground, and pile rocks on top of them, to deter the lizards. Dwarf species of Stegodon (a proboscidean related to living elephants) are suggested to have been a primary prey item of the Komodo dragon during the Pleistocene, prior to the introduction of their modern ungulate prey, which were only introduced to the islands in the Holocene, around 10-7,000 years ago.

The Komodo dragon drinks by sucking water into its mouth via buccal pumping (a process also used for respiration), lifting its head, and letting the water run down its throat.

=== Saliva ===
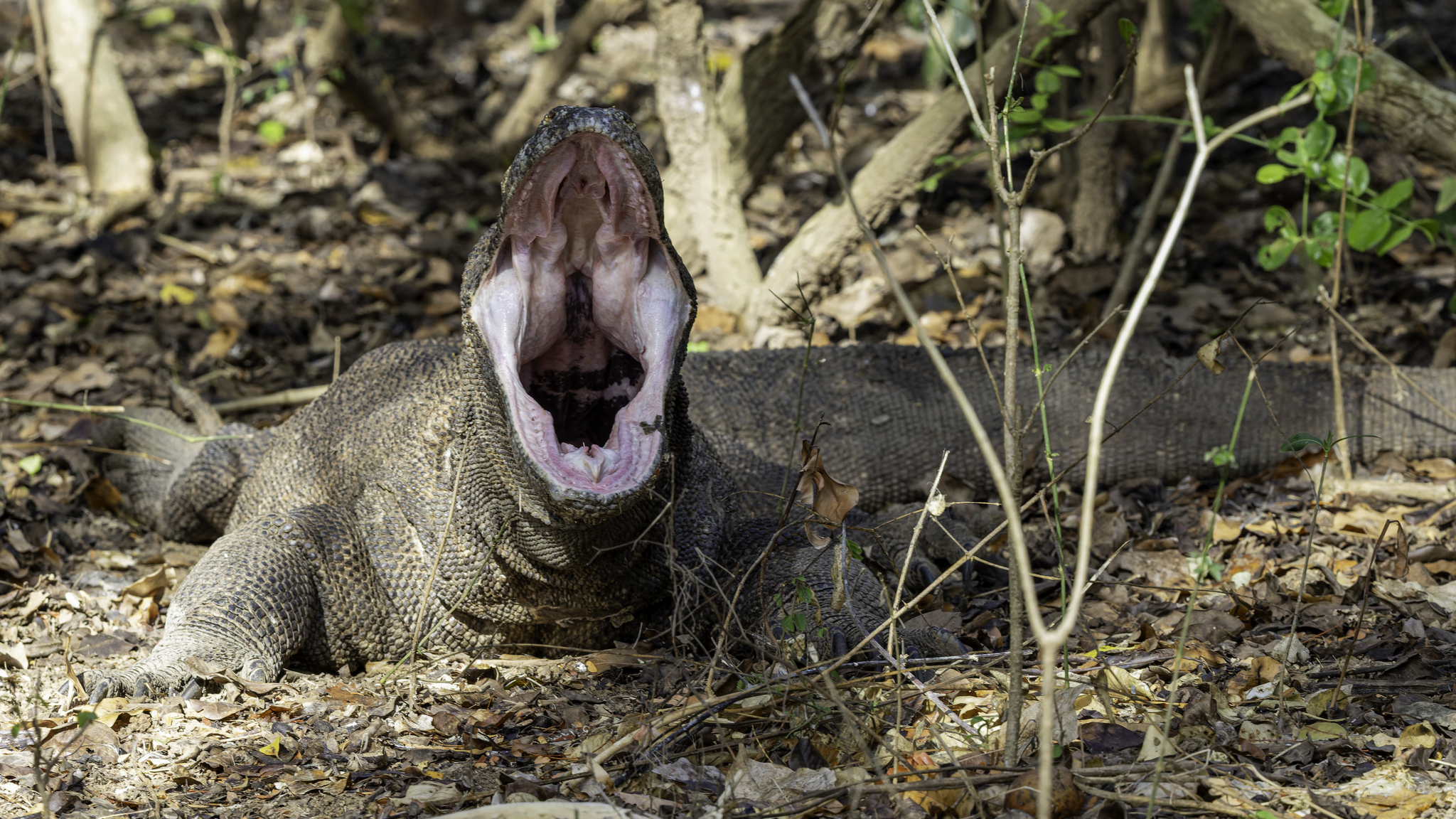
Showing inside of mouth

Although previous studies proposed that Komodo dragon saliva contains a variety of highly septic bacteria that would help to bring down prey, research in 2013 suggested that the bacteria in the mouths of Komodo dragons are ordinary and similar to those found in other carnivores. Komodo dragons have good mouth hygiene. To quote Bryan Fry: "After they are done feeding, they will spend 10 to 15 minutes lip-licking and rubbing their head in the leaves to clean their mouth ... Unlike people have been led to believe, they do not have chunks of rotting flesh from their meals on their teeth, cultivating bacteria." They do have a slashing bite, which normally includes a dose of their neurotoxic venom and anticoagulant saliva. Komodo dragons do not wait for prey to die and track it at a distance, as vipers do; observations of them hunting deer, boar and in some cases buffalo reveal that they kill prey in less than half an hour during successful hunts, and usually in a matter of a few minutes, similar to large mammalian carnivores. The observation of prey dying of sepsis is instead likely based on misinterpretations of failed predation attempts caused by the natural instinct of water buffalo, which are not native to the islands where the Komodo dragon lives, to run into water after escaping an attack. The warm, faeces-filled water would then cause the infections.

The study used samples from 16 captive dragons (10 adults and six neonates) from three US zoos.

=== Antibacterial immune factor ===
Researchers have isolated a powerful antibacterial peptide, VK25, from the blood plasma of Komodo dragons. Based on their analysis of this peptide, they have synthesized a short peptide dubbed DRGN-1 and tested it against multidrug-resistant (MDR) pathogens. Preliminary results of these tests show that DRGN-1 is effective in killing drug-resistant bacterial strains and even some fungi. It has the added observed benefit of significantly promoting wound healing in both uninfected and mixed biofilm infected wounds.

=== Venom ===
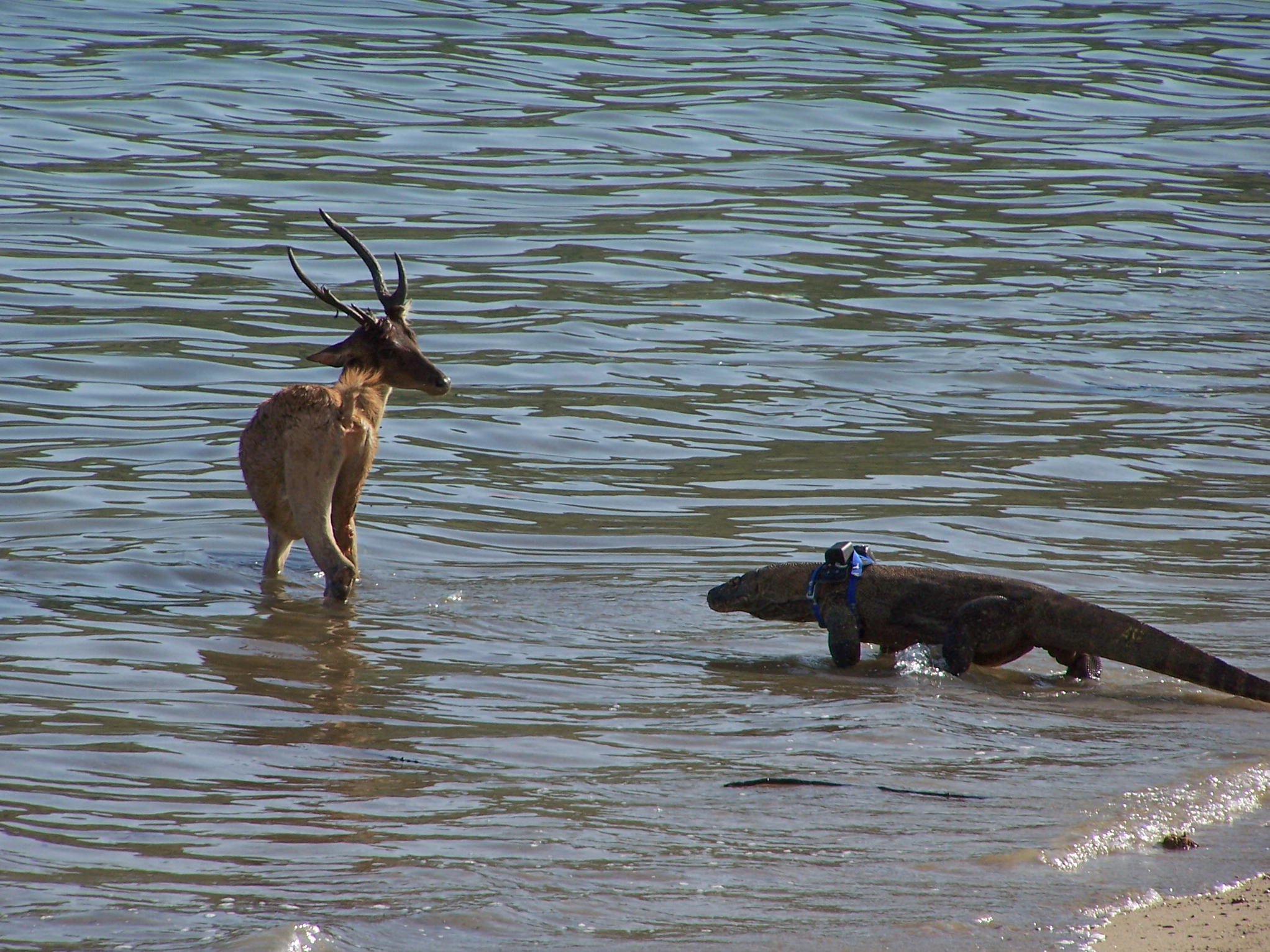
Komodo dragon stalking a Timor deer

In late 2005, researchers at the University of Melbourne speculated that the perentie (Varanus giganteus), other species of monitors, and agamids may be somewhat venomous. The team believes that the immediate effects of bites from these lizards were caused by mild envenomation. Bites on human digits by a lace monitor (V. varius), a Komodo dragon, and a spotted tree monitor (V. timorensis) all produced similar effects: rapid swelling, localised disruption of blood clotting, and shooting pain up to the elbow, with some symptoms lasting for several hours.

In 2009, the same researchers published further evidence demonstrating that Komodo dragons possess a venomous bite. MRI scans of a preserved skull showed the presence of two glands in the lower jaw. The researchers extracted one of these glands from the head of a terminally ill dragon in the Singapore Zoological Gardens, and found it secreted several different toxic proteins. The known functions of these proteins include inhibition of blood clotting, lowering of blood pressure, muscle paralysis, and the induction of hypothermia, leading to shock and loss of consciousness in envenomated prey. As a result of the discovery, the previous theory that bacteria were responsible for the deaths of Komodo victims was disputed.

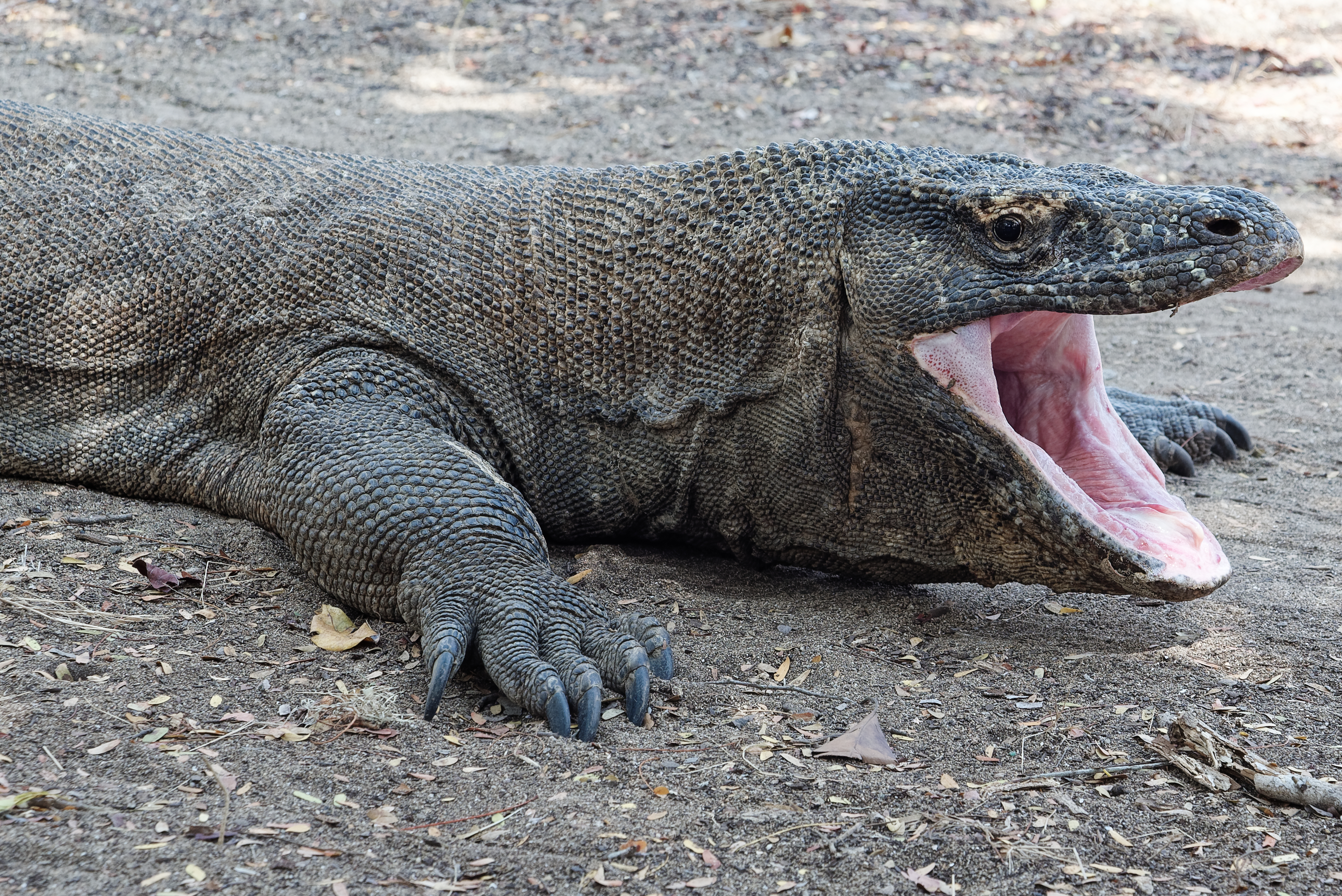
With mouth open, on Komodo Island

Other scientists have stated that this allegation of venom glands "has had the effect of underestimating the variety of complex roles played by oral secretions in the biology of reptiles, produced a very narrow view of oral secretions and resulted in misinterpretation of reptilian evolution". According to these scientists "reptilian oral secretions contribute to many biological roles other than to quickly dispatch prey". These researchers concluded, "Calling all in this clade venomous implies an overall potential danger that does not exist, misleads in the assessment of medical risks, and confuses the biological assessment of squamate biochemical systems." Evolutionary biologist Schwenk says that even if the lizards have venom-like proteins in their mouths they may be using them for a different function, and he doubts venom is necessary to explain the effect of a Komodo dragon bite, arguing that shock and blood loss are the primary factors. Although the mouths of Komodo dragons have been confirmed to contain venom glands with venom in them, it is not clear whether this venom has any serious effect on prey, as opposed to the damage caused by the bite itself. As of 2023, no clear unambiguous evidence of Komodo dragon bites having serious venom effects has been presented. A 2025 histochemical characterisation of the venom glands of the Komodo dragon confirmed the presence of several types of toxins, though the authors note that a venom depositing and draining structure has yet to be identified in lizard teeth, and stress that their study is restricted by specimen availability.

=== Reproduction ===
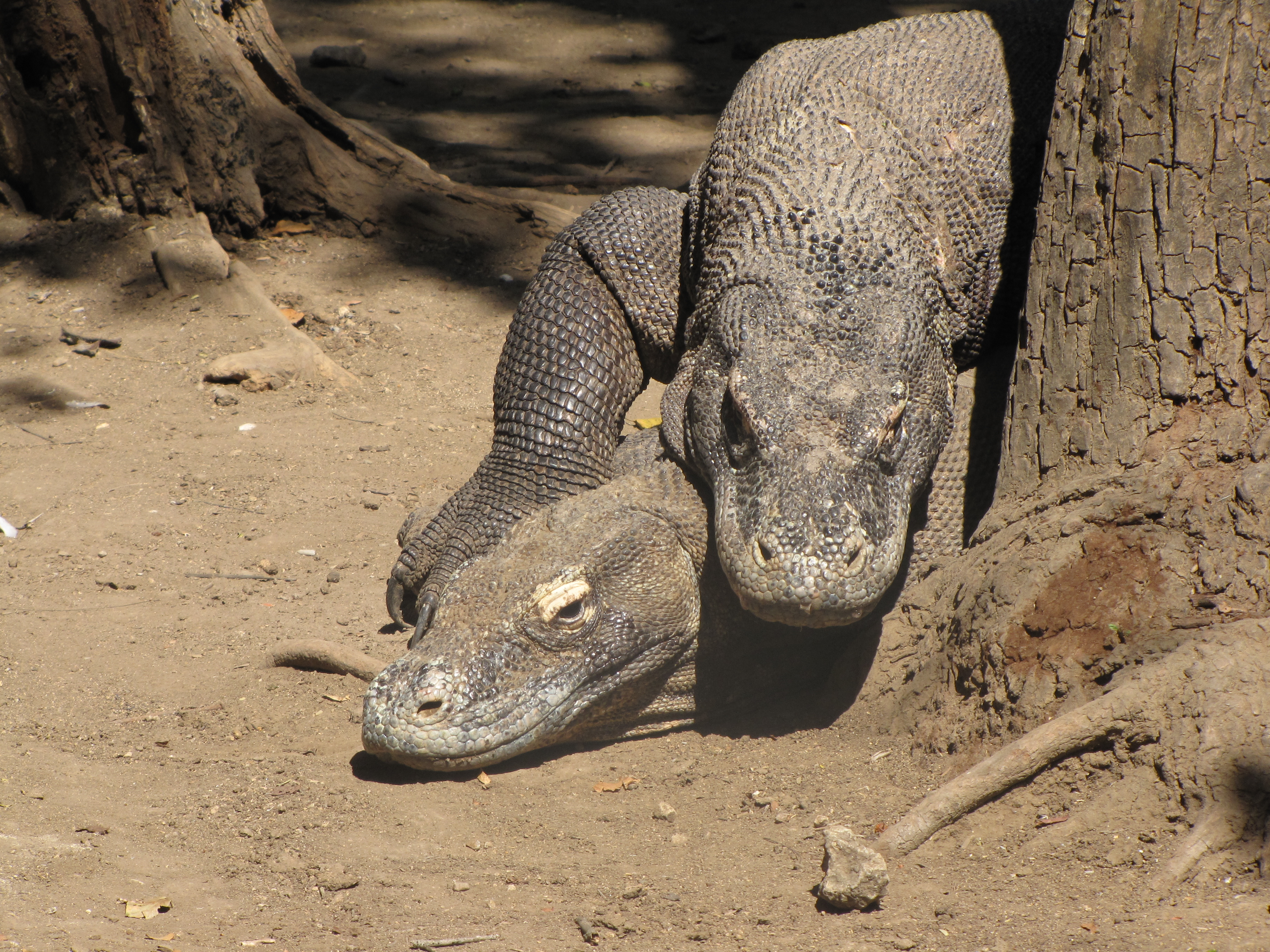
Komodo dragons mating

Mating occurs between May and August, with the eggs laid in September. During this period, males fight over females and territory by grappling with one another upon their hind legs, with the loser eventually being pinned to the ground. These males may vomit or defecate when preparing for the fight. The winner of the fight will then flick his long tongue at the female to gain information about her receptivity. Females are antagonistic and resist with their claws and teeth during the early phases of courtship. Therefore, the male must fully restrain the female during coitus to avoid being hurt. Other courtship displays include males rubbing their chins on the female, hard scratches to the back, and licking. Copulation occurs when the male inserts one of his hemipenes into the female's cloaca. Komodo dragons may be monogamous and form "pair bonds", a rare behavior for lizards. In order to avoid inbreeding, females actively select distantly related male sperm.

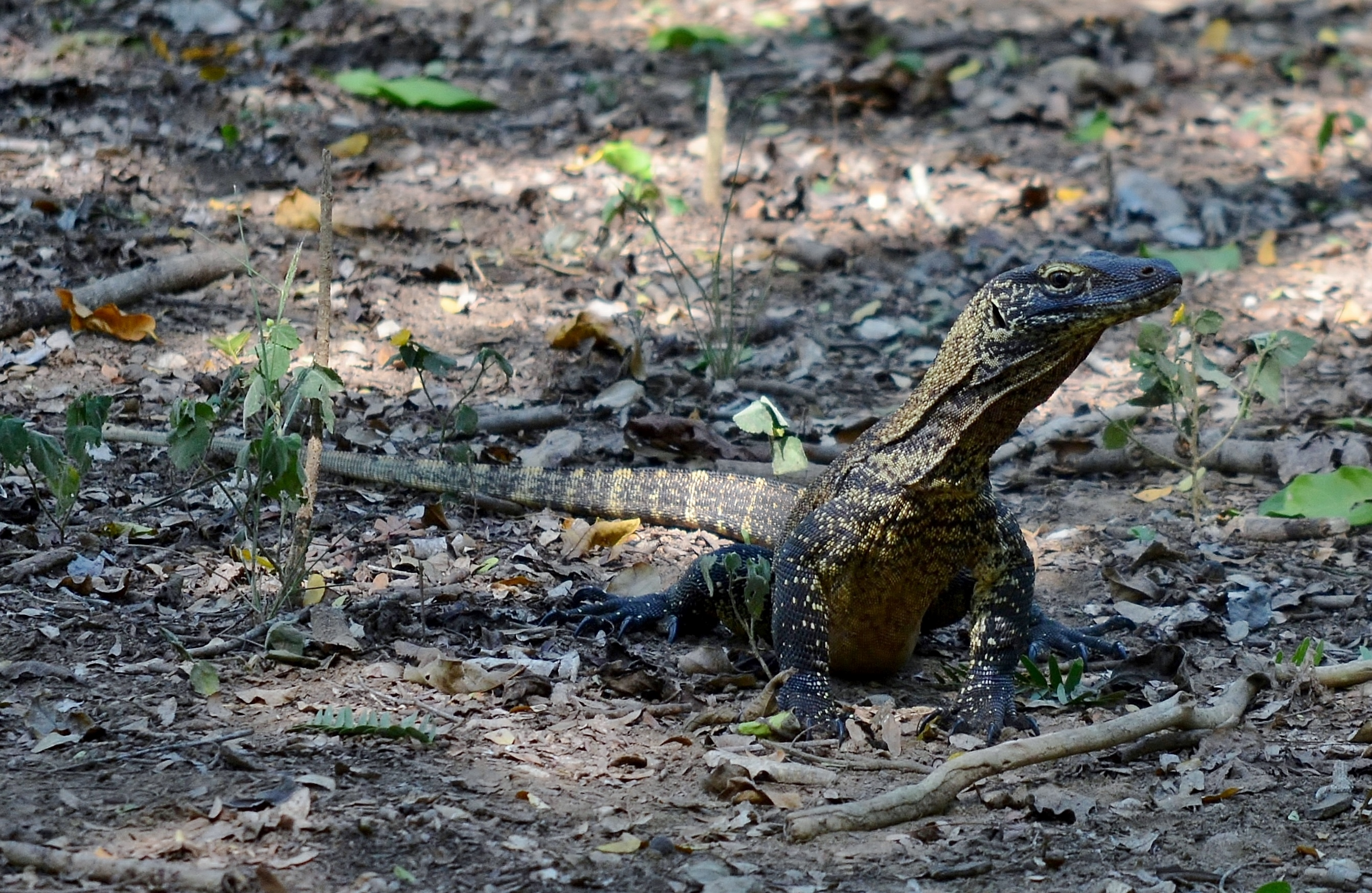
Juvenile

Female Komodos lay their eggs from August to September and may use several types of locality; in one study, 60% laid their eggs in the nests of orange-footed scrubfowl (a moundbuilder or megapode), 20% on ground level and 20% in hilly areas. The females make many camouflage nests/holes to prevent other dragons from eating the eggs. Nests typically house one female, however a study found evidence of two females occasionally occupying the same den. Clutches contain an average of 20 eggs, which have an incubation period of 7–8 months. Hatching is an exhausting effort for the neonates, which break out of their eggshells with an egg tooth that falls off before long. After cutting themselves out, the hatchlings may lie in their eggshells for hours before starting to dig out of the nest. They are born quite defenseless and are vulnerable to predation. Sixteen youngsters from a single nest were on average 46.5 cm long and weighed 105.1 grams.

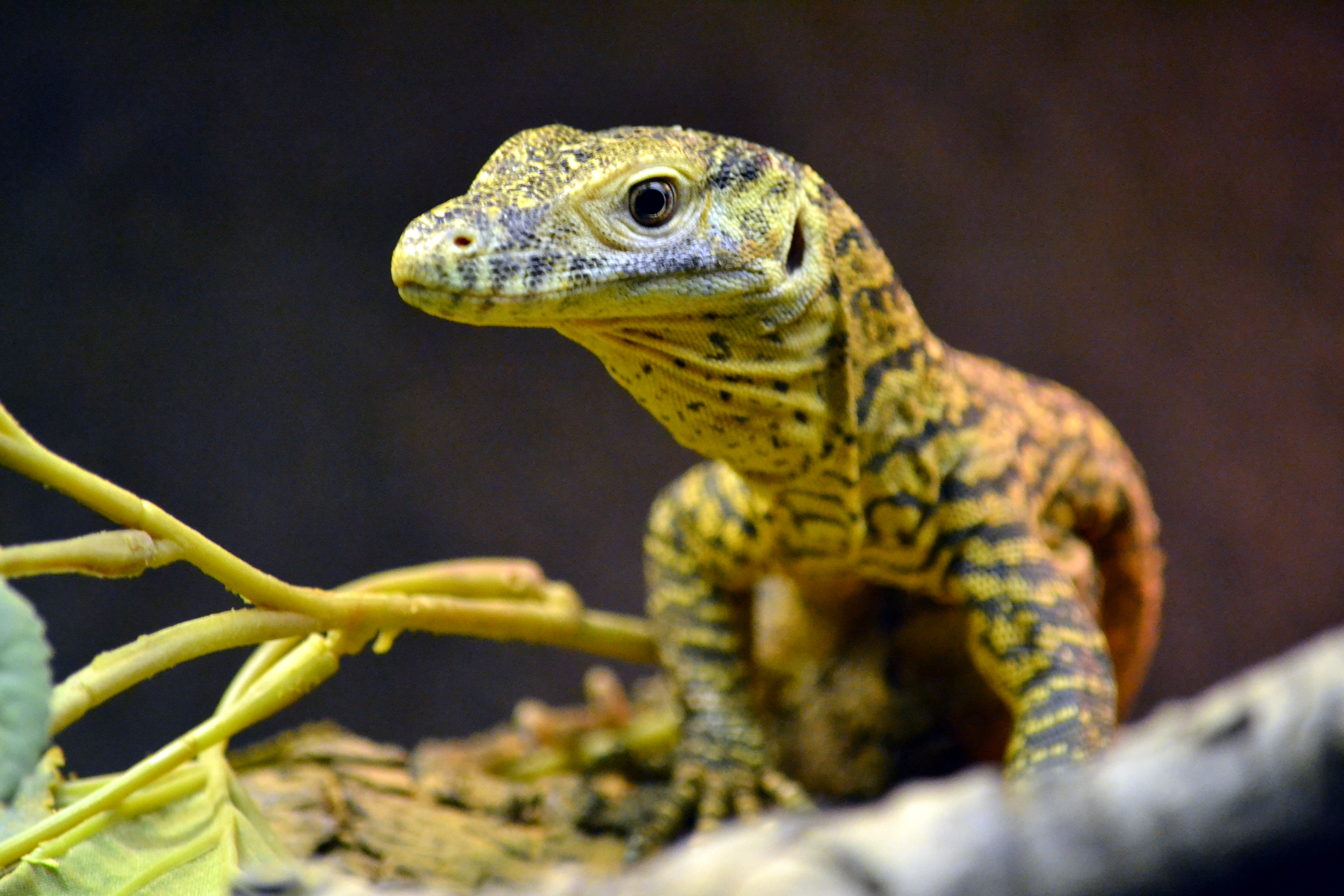
Baby at the Rotterdam Zoo

Young Komodo dragons spend much of their first few years in trees, where they are relatively safe from predators, including cannibalistic adults, as juvenile dragons make up 10% of their diets. The habit of cannibalism may be advantageous in sustaining the large size of adults, as medium-sized prey on the islands is rare. When the young approach a kill, they roll around in faecal matter and rest in the intestines of eviscerated animals to deter these hungry adults. Komodo dragons take approximately 8 to 11 years to mature, and may live for up to 30 years. The oldest recorded living Komodo dragon was 62 years old.

==== Parthenogenesis ====
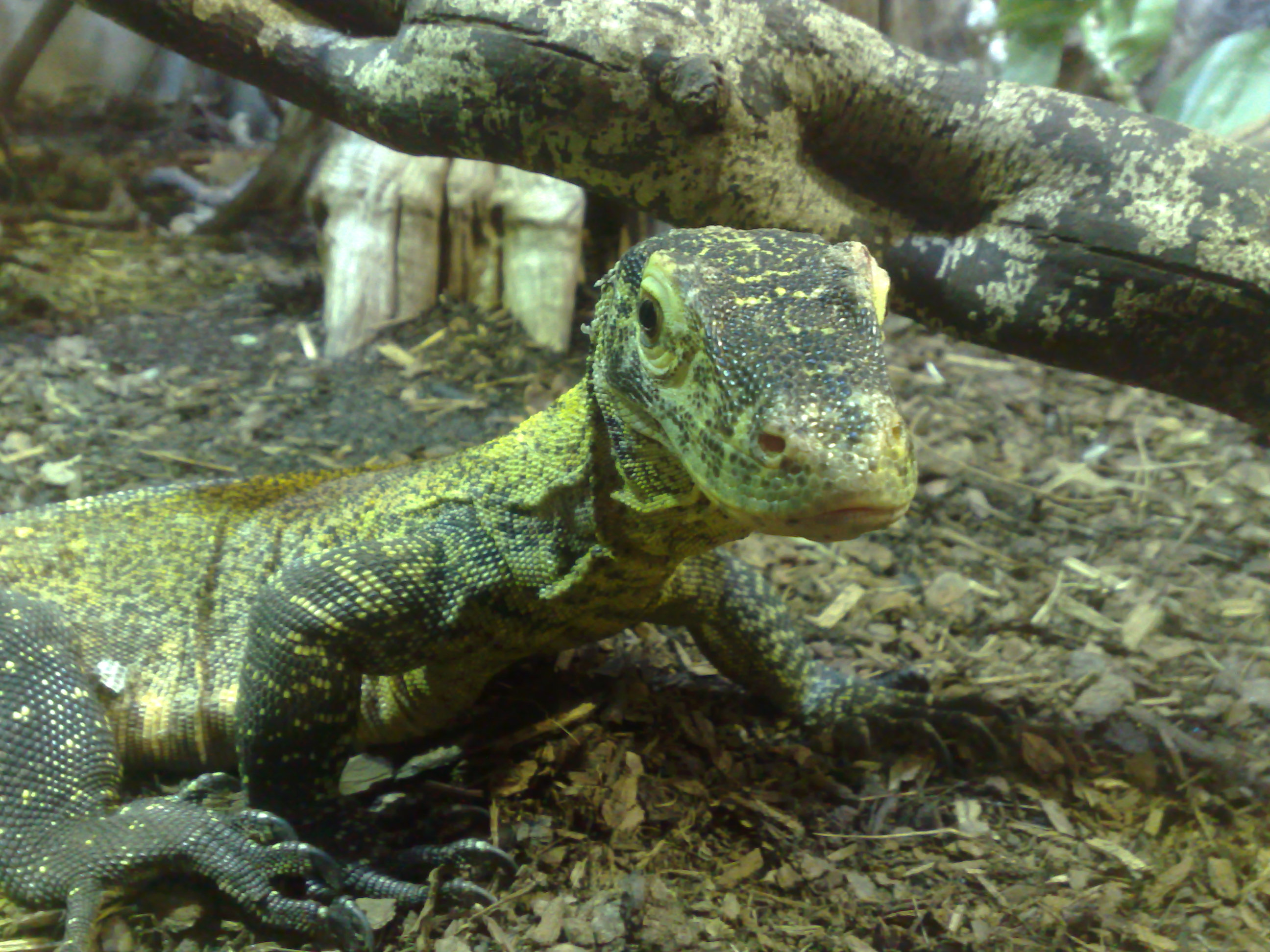
Parthenogenetic juvenile Komodo dragon, Chester Zoo, England

A Komodo dragon at London Zoo named Sungai laid a clutch of eggs in late 2005 after being separated from male company for more than two years. Scientists initially assumed she had been able to store sperm from her earlier encounter with a male, an adaptation known as superfecundation. On 20 December 2006, it was reported that Flora, a captive Komodo dragon living in the Chester Zoo in England, was the second known Komodo dragon to have laid unfertilised eggs: she laid 11 eggs, and seven of them hatched, all of them male. Scientists at Liverpool University in England performed genetic tests on three eggs that collapsed after being moved to an incubator, and verified Flora had never been in physical contact with a male dragon. After Flora's eggs' condition had been discovered, testing showed Sungai's eggs were also produced without outside fertilization. On 31 January 2008, the Sedgwick County Zoo in Wichita, Kansas, became the first zoo in the Americas to document parthenogenesis in Komodo dragons. The zoo has two adult female Komodo dragons, one of which laid about 17 eggs on 19–20 May 2007. Only two eggs were incubated and hatched due to space issues; the first hatched on 31 January 2008, while the second hatched on 1 February. Both hatchlings were males.

Komodo dragons have the ZW chromosomal sex-determination system, as opposed to the mammalian XY system. Male progeny prove Flora's unfertilized eggs were haploid (n) and doubled their chromosomes later to become diploid (2n) (by being fertilized by a polar body, or by chromosome duplication without cell division), rather than by her laying diploid eggs by one of the meiosis reduction-divisions in her ovaries failing. When a female Komodo dragon (with ZW sex chromosomes) reproduces in this manner, she provides her progeny with only one chromosome from each of her pairs of chromosomes, including only one of her two sex chromosomes. This single set of chromosomes is duplicated in the egg, which develops parthenogenetically. Eggs receiving a Z chromosome become ZZ (male); those receiving a W chromosome become WW and fail to develop, meaning that only males are produced by parthenogenesis in this species.

It has been hypothesised that this reproductive adaptation allows a single female to enter an isolated ecological niche (such as an island) and by parthenogenesis produce male offspring, thereby establishing a sexually reproducing population (via reproduction with her offspring that can result in both male and female young). Despite the advantages of such an adaptation, zoos are cautioned that parthenogenesis may be detrimental to genetic diversity.

=== Encounters with humans ===
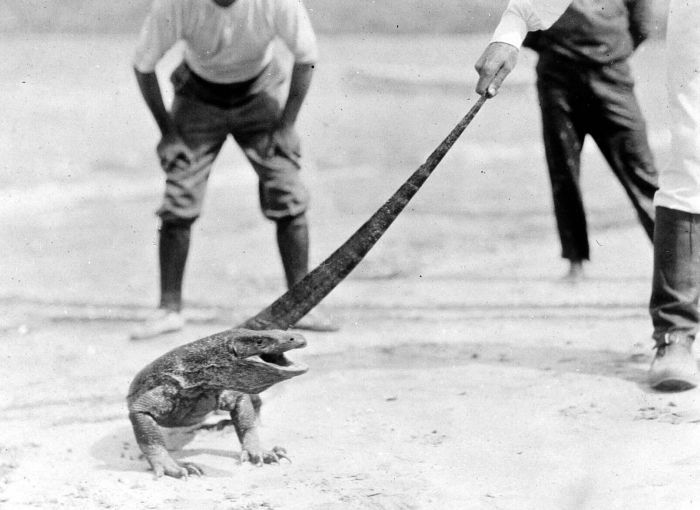
Humans handling a Komodo dragon

Attacks on humans are rare, but Komodo dragons have been responsible for several human fatalities, both in the wild and in captivity. According to data from Komodo National Park spanning a 38-year period between 1974 and 2012, there were 24 reported attacks on humans, five of them fatal. Most of the victims were local villagers living around the national park.

Komodo dragons generally avoid encounters with humans. Juveniles are very shy and will flee quickly into a hideout if a human comes closer than about 100 metres (330 ft). Older animals will also retreat from humans from a shorter distance away. If cornered, they may react aggressively by gaping their mouth, hissing, and swinging their tail. If they are disturbed further, they may attack and bite. Although there are anecdotes of unprovoked Komodo dragons attacking or preying on humans, most of these reports are either not reputable or have subsequently been interpreted as defensive bites. Only very few cases are truly the result of unprovoked attacks by atypical individuals who lost their fear of humans.

== Conservation ==
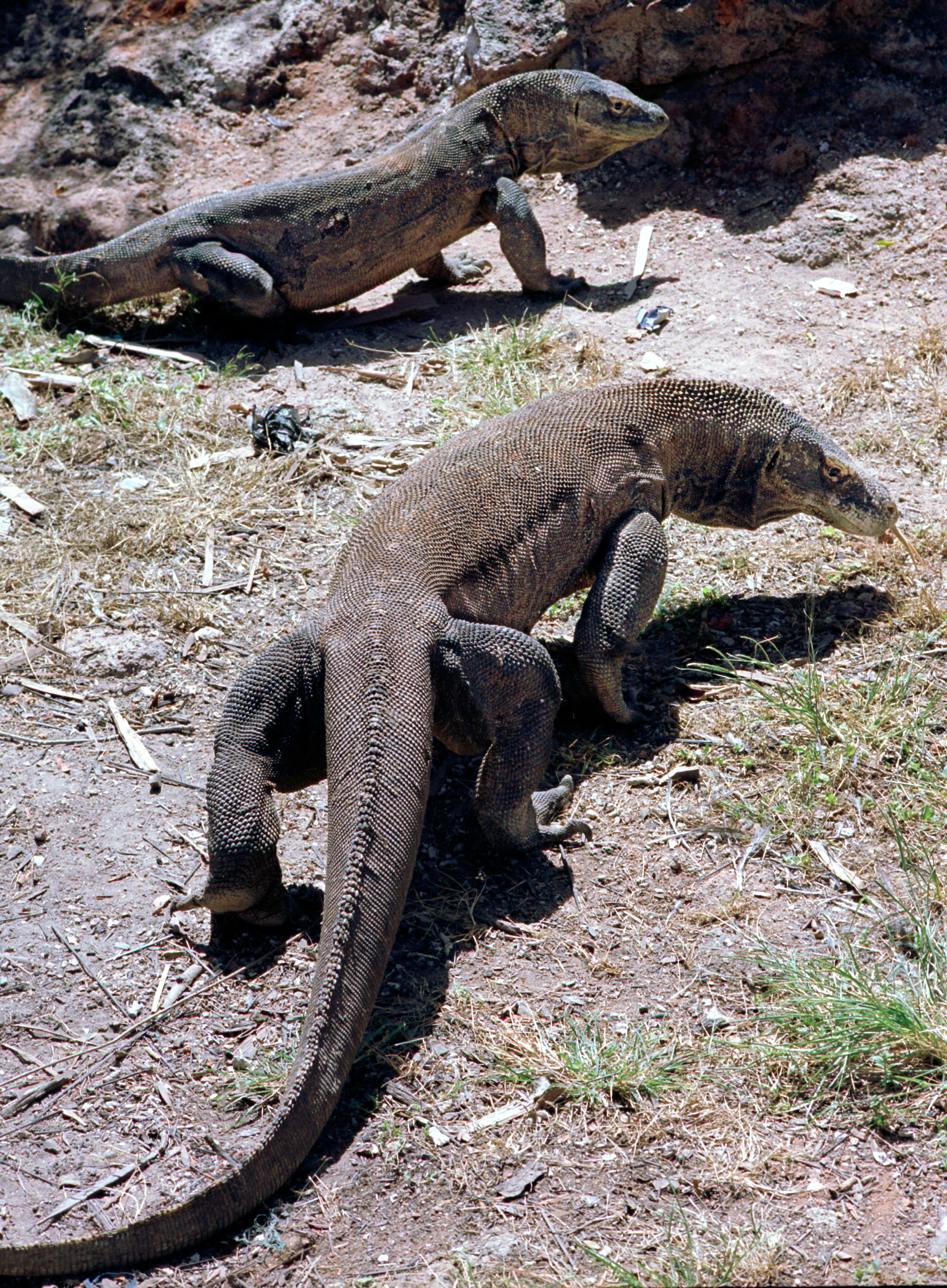
Komodo dragons on Rinca

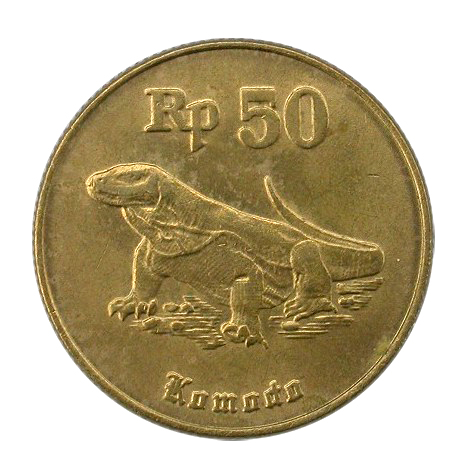
The Komodo dragon, as depicted on the 50 rupiah coin, issued by Indonesia

The Komodo dragon is classified by the IUCN as Endangered and is listed on the IUCN Red List. The species' sensitivity to natural and human-made threats has long been recognized by conservationists, zoological societies, and the Indonesian government. Komodo National Park was founded in 1980 to protect Komodo dragon populations on islands including Komodo, Rinca, and Padar. Later, the Wae Wuul and Wolo Tado Reserves were opened on Flores to aid Komodo dragon conservation.

Volcanic activity, earthquakes, loss of habitat, fire, tourism, loss of prey due to poaching, and illegal poaching of the dragons themselves have all contributed to the vulnerable status of the Komodo dragon. A major future threat to the species is climate change via both aridification and sea level rise, which can affect the low-lying habitats and valleys that the Komodo dragon depends on, as Komodo dragons do not range into the higher-altitude regions of the islands they inhabit. Based on projections, climate change will lead to a decline in suitable habitat of 8.4%, 30.2%, or 71% by 2050 depending on the climate change scenario. Without effective conservation actions, populations on Flores are extirpated in all scenarios, while in the more extreme scenarios, only the populations on Komodo and Rinca persist in highly reduced numbers. Rapid climate change mitigation is crucial for conserving the species in the wild. Other scientists have disputed the conclusions about the effects of climate change on Komodo dragon populations.

Under Appendix I of CITES (the Convention on International Trade in Endangered Species), commercial international trade of Komodo dragon skins or specimens is prohibited. Despite this, there are occasional reports of illegal attempts to trade in live Komodo dragons. The most recent attempt was in March 2019, when Indonesian police in the East Java city of Surabaya reported that a criminal network had been caught trying to smuggle 41 young Komodo dragons out of Indonesia. The plan was said to include shipping the animals to several other countries in Southeast Asia through Singapore. It was hoped that the animals could be sold for up to 500 million rupiah (around US$35,000) each. It was believed that the Komodo dragons had been smuggled out of East Nusa Tenggara province through the port at Ende in central Flores.

In 2013, the total population of Komodo dragons in the wild was assessed as 3,222 individuals, declining to 3,092 in 2014 and 3,014 in 2015. Populations remained relatively stable on the bigger islands (Komodo and Rinca), but decreased on smaller islands, such as Nusa Kode and Gili Motang, likely due to diminishing prey availability. On Padar, a former population of Komodo dragons has recently become extirpated, of which the last individuals were seen in 1975. It is widely assumed that the Komodo dragon died out on Padar following a major decline of populations of large ungulate prey, for which poaching was most likely responsible.

Since the species is only found in remnant populations in the Wallacean Island, studies have examined the traits and factors that led to these certain populations' surprising persistence. A comprehensive examination of the species survival suggested that rather than being a single attribute, but the a combination including ectotherm traits, varanid biology, habitat, and anthropogenic factors.

=== In captivity ===
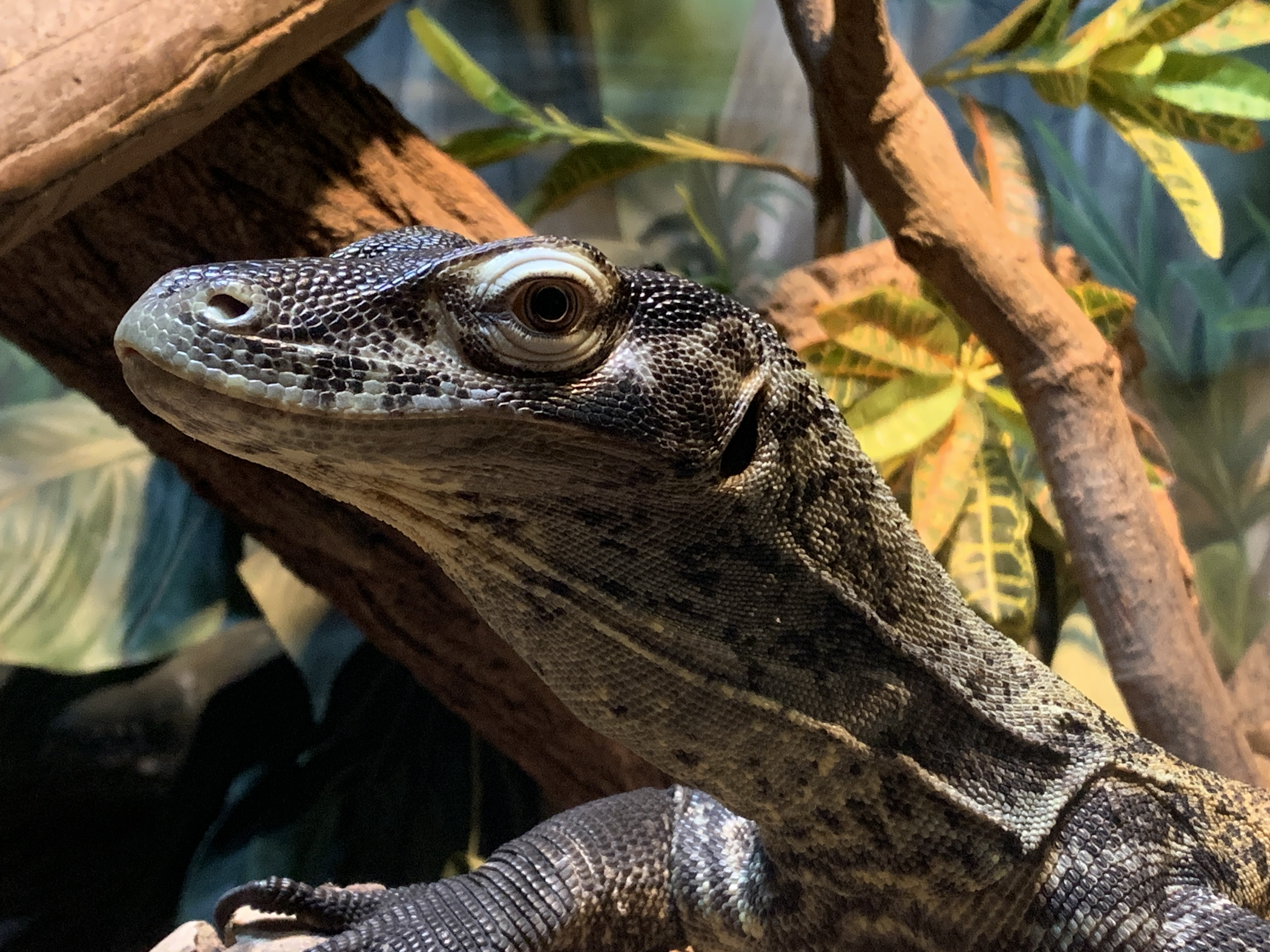
Juvenile at the Bronx Zoo

Komodo dragon feeding on a carcass, San Diego Zoo (video clip)

Komodo dragons have long been sought-after zoo attractions, where their size and reputation make them popular exhibits. They are, however, rare in zoos because they are susceptible to infection and parasitic disease if captured from the wild, and do not readily reproduce in captivity. A pair of Komodo dragons was displayed at the Bronx Zoo in New York in September 1926, but they only lasted a couple of months, dying in October and November 1926. The first Komodo dragons were displayed at London Zoo in 1927. A Komodo dragon was exhibited in 1934 in the United States at the National Zoo in Washington, D.C., but it lived for only two years. More attempts to exhibit Komodo dragons were made, but the lifespan of the animals in captivity at the time proved very short, averaging five years in the National Zoological Park. Studies were done by Walter Auffenberg, which were documented in his book The Behavioral Ecology of the Komodo Monitor, eventually allowing for more successful management and breeding of the dragons in captivity. Surabaya Zoo in Indonesia has been breeding Komodo dragons since 1990 and had 134 dragons in 2022, the largest collection outside its natural habitat. As of May 2009, there were 35 North American, 13 European, one Singaporean, two African, and two Australian institutions which housed captive Komodo dragons. In 2016, four Komodo dragons were transferred from the Bronx Zoo to Madras Crocodile Bank Trust in India.

A variety of behaviors have been observed from captive specimens. Most individuals become relatively tame within a short time, and are capable of recognising individual humans and discriminating between familiar and unfamiliar keepers. Komodo dragons have also been observed to engage in play with a variety of objects, including shovels, cans, plastic rings, and shoes. This behavior does not seem to be "food-motivated predatory behavior".

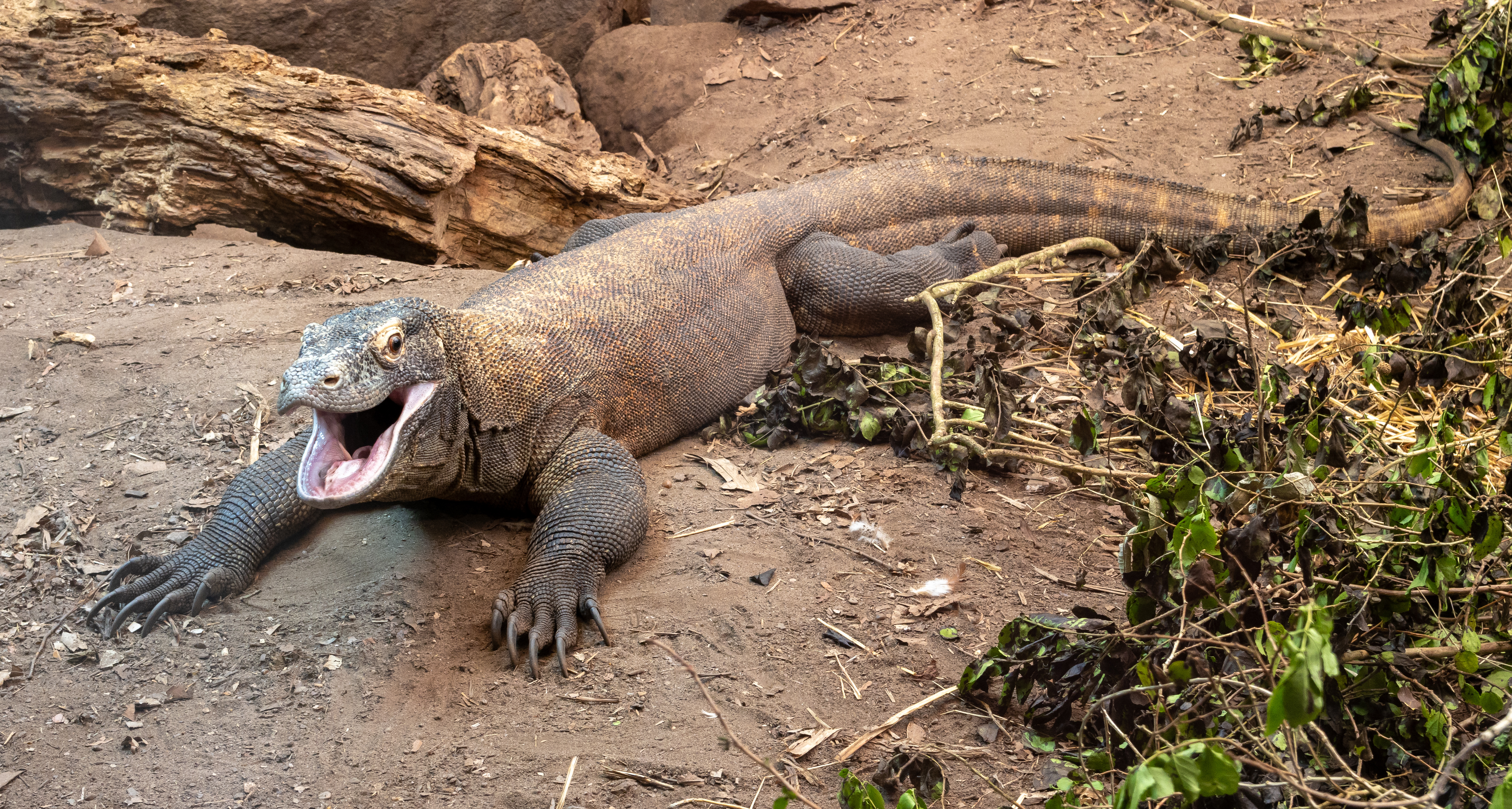
Komodo Dragon at Chester Zoo

Even seemingly docile dragons may become unpredictably aggressive, especially when the animal's territory is invaded by someone unfamiliar. In June 2001, a Komodo dragon seriously injured Phil Bronstein, the then-husband of actress Sharon Stone, when he entered its enclosure at the Los Angeles Zoo after being invited in by its keeper. Bronstein was bitten on his bare foot, as the keeper had told him to take off his white shoes and socks, which the keeper stated could potentially excite the Komodo dragon as they were the same colour as the white rats the zoo fed the dragon. Although he survived, Bronstein needed to have several tendons in his foot reattached surgically.

== See also ==
- List of largest extant lizards
- Komodo Indonesian Fauna Museum and Reptile Park
- Conservation in Indonesia
