= Manggarai people =

Ethnic group in Indonesia

Ata Manggarai
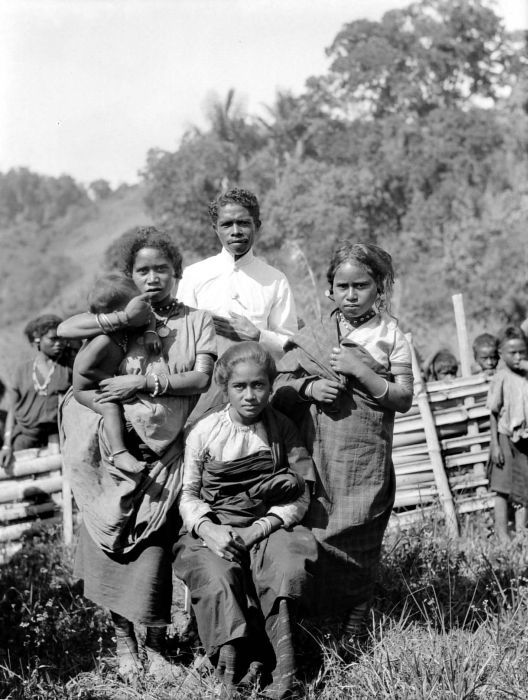
- A Manggarai family.

Total population
- 725,000

Regions with significant populations
- Indonesia (East Nusa Tenggara; Flores Island)

Languages
- Manggarai, Indonesian, Kupang Malay

Religion
- Christianity (predominantly Roman Catholic) – 90%, Sunni Islam – 10%

Related ethnic groups
- Komodo • Ngada • Riung • Rajong • Rembong • Rongga

The Manggarai are an ethnic group found in western Flores in the East Nusa Tenggara province, Indonesia. Manggarai people are spread across three regencies in the province, namely the West Manggarai, Manggarai, and East Manggarai. In addition, Manggarai people can also be found near the border with Ngada Regency, as well as migrating to Bima Regency.

== Etymology ==
The Manggarai people sometimes refer to themselves as Ata Manggarai, which means 'people of Manggarai'.

== Settlements ==
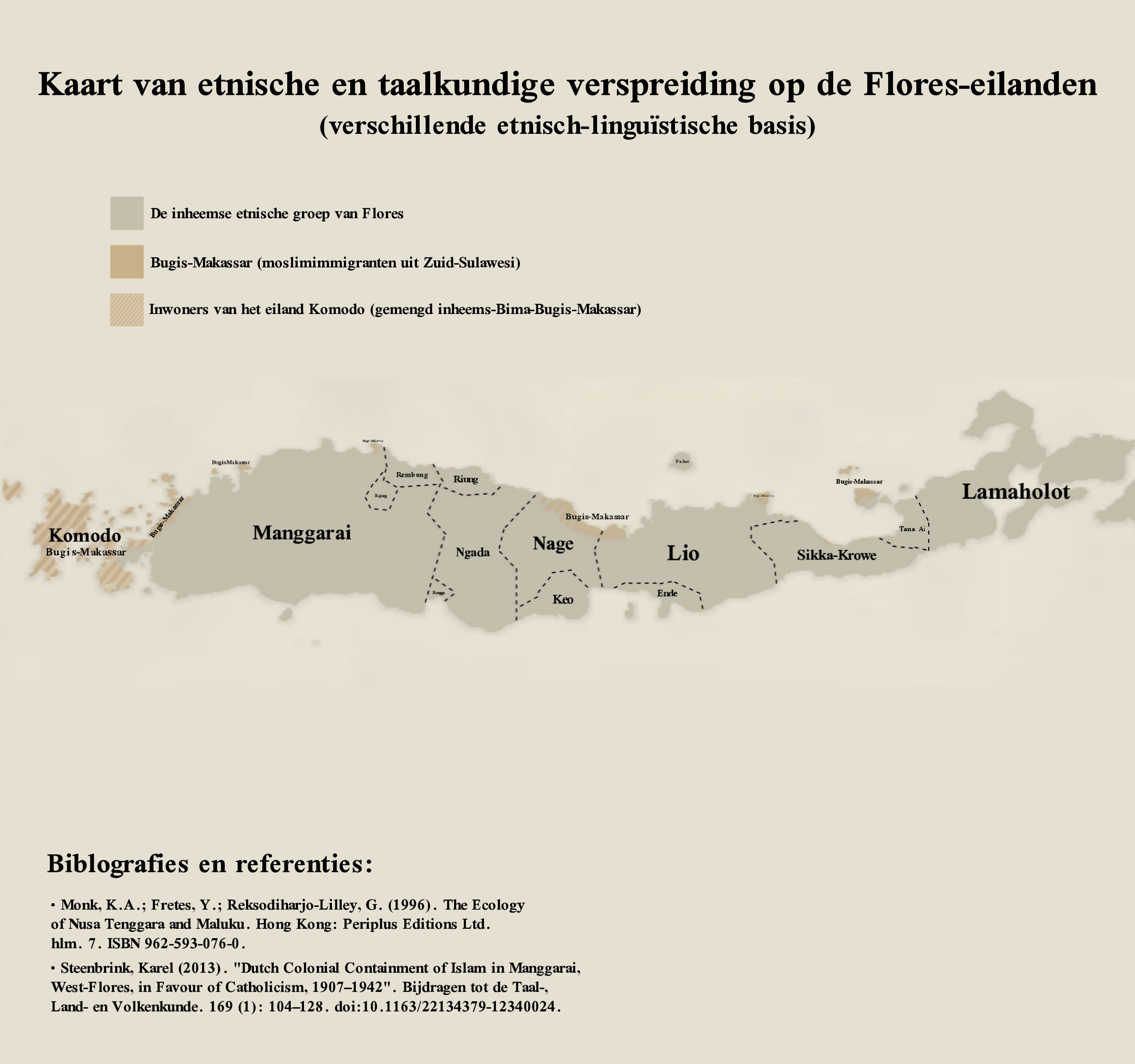
The distribution area of the Manggarai people is located to the western part of Flores.

The Manggarai people are the native inhabitants of the western part of Flores, living in the Greater Manggarai, which consists of three regencies, namely West Manggarai, Manggarai, and East Manggarai. The Manggarai settlements cover more than 6,700 square kilometers, almost a third of Flores, in the western part of the island. In addition, Manggarai people can be found in other places, such as on Komodo Island, Bima Regency, Ngada Regency, and migrating to Kupang and Jakarta.

== History ==
According to historical records, Manggarai has been ruled by the Bima people from the island of Sumbawa under Bima Sultanate and the Makassar people from Sulawesi under Gowa Sultanate. As of the late 20th century, there are about 500,000 Manggarai people.

One of the early state formation in Manggarai in the 17th century was the formation of the tribal kingdom of Todo, whose first king was called Mashur of Minangkabau descent from the Sultanate of Gowa, Makassar. In 1727, the Manggarai region was given to the Bima Sultanate as a dowry when a Makassarese princess called Daeng Tamima was married into the Bima royalty, and founded Reo on the coast. Under Bima Sultanate, the region was divided to systems of tributary kings called Kedaluan and Gelarang. Meanwhile the sultanate representatives were rulers of Reo and Pota which used the title naib, they ruled over smaller kedaluan called dalu koe (smaller kedaluan). The most powerful Kedaluans were Todo, Cibal, and Bajo, collectively called dalu mese (bigger kedaluan), which had origins before Bima Sultanate hegemonic rule, among these only Todo ruled over dalu koe, numbering thirteen hence called dalu campulutelu.

In 1929, the Western part of Flores was separated from the Bima Sultanate. Then, followed by the invasion of the Dutch colonialists in the 20th century and the subsequent Christianization of Manggarai.

== Language ==
The language spoken throughout the region is called Tombo Manggarai, a language with around 43 sub-dialects divided into 5 dialect groups which is very distinct from the languages of ethnic groups to the east and from Indonesian. The 5 dialect groups are Western Manggarai, Central West Manggarai, Central Manggarai, East Manggarai and Far East Manggarai. The latter, separated from other dialects by the Rembong language, is distributed in the north-central part of the island of Flores. It is spoken by about 300,000 people. There are also native speakers of the Rongga language (there are about 5,000 of them) living in three settlements in the southern part of the East Manggarai Regency. This language is not singled out even by most of Manggarai people themselves, because it is considered as part of the Manggarai language.

== Culture ==
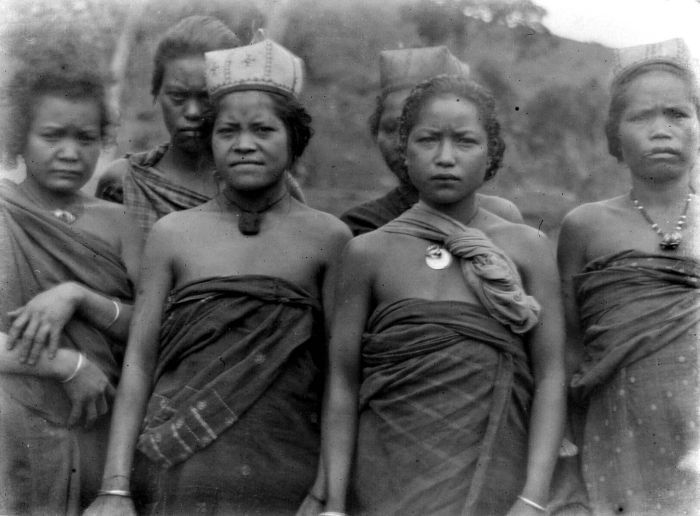
Manggarai (Todo-Pongkor) womenfolk.

=== Religion ===
More than 90% of the Manggarai people are Catholics; the eastern Manggarai in the region of Borong are Catholics. Some living in the coastal west profess Sunnism (their number is approximately 33,898 people), the spread of Islam on the island of Flores most likely through trading sea-route. Meanwhile the population of the central part of the island adheres of traditional beliefs and later mixed with catholicism. This is because under the agreement of 1783 between Sultan Abdulkadim of Bima and dalu (king) of Manggarai, muslim citizens including children of mix marriages, were prohibited to live in the kedaluan areas and only able to live in coastal area such as Reo, Pota, Bari, Gunung Tallo, and Nangalili.

Traditional beliefs of settlements in the central part of the island include the cult of the supreme creator god, Mori Karaeng, a form of ancestral worship. Massive celebrations are held by the priest to sacrifice buffalos (ata Mbeki), which are accompanied by ritual dances and battles between the two parties of men in military garb.

=== Rituals ===
The Manggarai people are known to have series of ritual as a thanksgiving for the life that has been given to them to live in a certain time period. Among others are:-

- Penti Manggarai, a ceremony of harvest thanksgiving celebration.
- Barong Lodok, a ritual that invites the guardian spirit to the center of Lingko (middle farm).
- Barong Wae, a ritual to invite ancestral spirits to be a watcher over springs.
- Barong Compang, a ceremony of summoning a village guardian spirit at night.
- Wisi Loce, this ceremony is conducted so that all spirits who are invited are able to wait a moment before the climax of the Penti ceremony.
- Libur Kilo, a ceremony of thanksgiving for the welfare of each family in their homes.

=== Traditional clothing ===
Initially, the traditional clothing consist of two pieces of fabric, reinforced in front and behind with a cord at the waist and hips. Modern clothing are of the same type as mainstream Indonesian.

=== Fighting arts ===
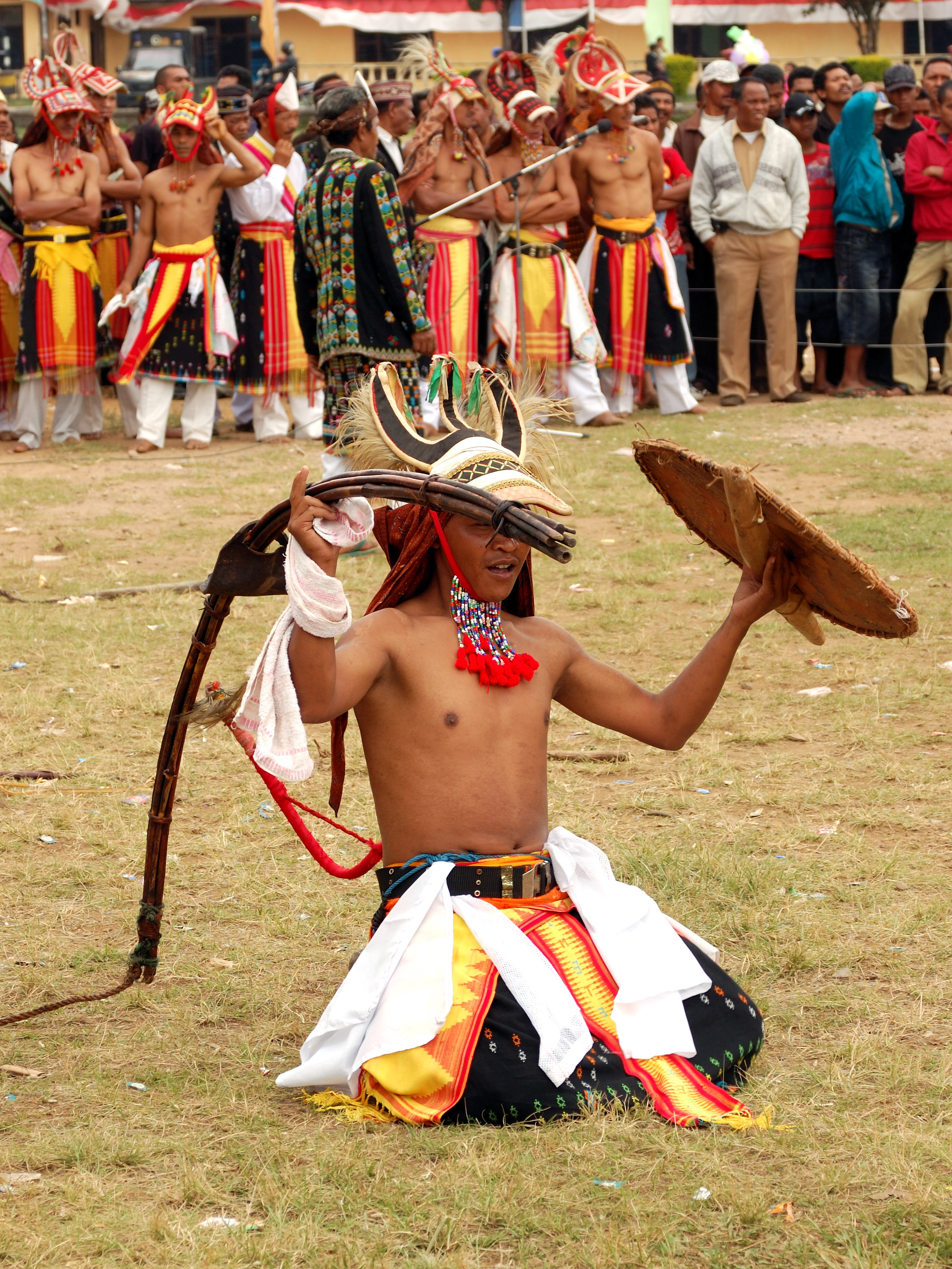
A Caci warrior and his whip, Ruteng, Flores, Indonesia, 2007.

Manggarai people also have a traditional folk sport and war dance called caci, a form of whip fighting where fighting and parrying each other using a whip and a shield is usually performed by two young men in a large field. Caci performance usually begins with danding dance performances, before the caci warriors display their abilities to hit and parry in the competition. The dance is commonly referred to as Tandak Manggarai, a dance performed on stage to predict the outcome of the caci competition.

== Society and lifestyle ==
The early political system of Manggarai was clan-based patrilineal system, and historically they lived in villages consisted of at least two clans. This system was already practiced by communities of Todo, Bajo and Cibal. Later on, the Bima Sultanate organized this system into 39 kedaluans (chiefdoms), each led by a ruler called dalu, which in turn split into smaller administrative units that are known as gelarang (dalu-helpers) and beo (village leaders), additionally Sultan's representatives called naib ruled Reo and Pota, they historically had higher ranking than dalu and were intermediaries between the dalu and Sultan. At the head of the kedaluan is controlled by one of the localized patriarchate clan (wa'u), that ascended from the first settlers. Family relationships are based on the patrilineal line. The Manggarai people recognizes several types of marriages such as matrilateral cross-cousin marriage, Levirate marriage, Sororate marriage, a marriage between the offspring of two sisters that marries the sons of two brothers, and so on. Most monogamous family are formed by Christians, and small groups among Muslims and adherents of traditional beliefs allows Polygyny. The Manggarai people to this day are divided into three social groups namely, aristocrats (karaeng), community members (ata-leke) and descendants of slaves.

The traditional settlement has a circular layout, and the modern (beo) is an ordinary one. In the center of the settlement is a round public space on which is a large tree; usually of the Ficus genus and megalithic structures are found. In the past, a settlement could consist of one large house, which could hold up to 200 people. In modern settlements, beo usually has from 5 to 20 homes of round or oval shape on stilts, with a high (about 9 meters) conical roof descending to the ground.

In Manggarai settlements, free spaces are paved with huge stones. In the city of Ende, the dead are buried in round holes, which are closed by stones placed on the grave.

=== Livelihood ===
Distribution of handicrafts are such as carving, metalworking and weaving. They also engage in manual tropical farming (they switched from slash-and-burn system to Crop rotation system to grow Upland rice, legumes, vegetables, tobacco, coffee and corn). Animal husbandry is widespread (buffaloes are bred for socially significant animal ceremonies, horses are kept as packs transportation, pigs and chickens). Manggarai people do not hunt nor do they fish.

=== Dietary ===
The main food is corn porridge with vegetables and pork (which are only consumed by non-Muslim Manggarai people), as well as palm wine (tuak). Rice is served on the table only as a festive meal.

== See also ==
- Ngada people, an ethnic group from Ngada who are related to the Manggarai
- Rongga people, an ethnic group from East Manggarai who are related to the Manggarai
