= Sumba–Flores languages =

Subgroup of the Austronesian language family

Sumba–Flores
- Geographic distribution: Indonesia (Lesser Sunda Islands)
- Linguistic classification: Austronesian: Malayo-Polynesian; (Central); Eastern Lesser Sunda languages; Sumba–Flores
- Subdivisions: Sumba–Hawu; Western Flores

Language codes
- Glottolog: flor1240

The Sumba–Flores languages, which correspond to the traditional "Bima–Sumba" subgroup minus Bima, are a proposed group of Austronesian languages (geographically Central–Eastern Malayo-Polynesian languages) spoken on and around the islands of Sumba and western–central Flores in the Lesser Sundas, Indonesia. The main languages are Manggarai, which has half a million speakers on the western third of Flores, and Kambera, with a quarter million speakers on the eastern half of Sumba Island.

The Hawu language of Savu Island is suspected of having a non-Austronesian substratum, but perhaps not to any greater extent than the languages of central and eastern Flores, such as Sika, or indeed of Central Malayo-Polynesian languages in general.

== Classification ==
Blust (2008) finds moderate support for linking the languages of western and central Flores with Sumba–Hawu.

- Sumba–Flores
  - Sumba–Hawu
    - Hawu–Dhao
    - Sumba languages (see)
  - Western Flores
    - Manggarai–Rembong: Komodo, Manggarai, Manus, Riung, Rembong, Rajong, Kepo', Wae Rana
    - Central Flores–Paluʼe
      - Paluʼe
      - Central Flores
        - Ende–Lio: a dialect cluster of Ende, Lio, Nage, Kéo
        - Ngada: Namut–Nginamanu, Ngadʼa, Rongga, Soʼa (dialect cluster)

== See also ==
- Sumba languages
- Central Flores languages
