= Wae Rana language =

Austronesian language spoken in Flores, Indonesia

Wae Rana
- Kolor, Mbaen
- Native to: Indonesia
- Region: central Flores
- Native speakers: 3,000 (2010)
- Language family: Austronesian: Malayo-Polynesian; Central–Eastern; Sumba–Flores; Ende–Manggarai; Central Flores; Wae Rana

Language codes
- ISO 639-3: wrx
- Glottolog: waer1237
- ELP: Wae Rana

Wae Rana, or Kolor, is a language of central Flores, in East Nusa Tenggara Province, Indonesia.
