= Kepos =

Town of ancient Thrace

Coordinates: 41°01′19″N 28°57′12″E

Kepos (Greek: Κήπος) was a town of ancient Thrace, inhabited during Roman times.

Its site is located above Melias Sinus in European Turkey.
