= Rajong language =

Austronesian language spoken in Flores, Indonesia

Rajong
- Native to: Indonesia
- Region: central Flores
- Ethnicity: Rajong
- Native speakers: 6,000 (2010)
- Language family: Austronesian: Malayo-Polynesian; Central–Eastern; Sumba–Flores; Ende–Manggarai; Central Flores; Rajong

Language codes
- ISO 639-3: rjg
- Glottolog: rajo1237
- ELP: Rajong

Rajong (Razong) is a language of central Flores, in East Nusa Tenggara Province, Indonesia.
