= Riung language =

Austronesian language spoken in Flores, Indonesia

Riung
- Far Eastern Manggarai
- Native to: Indonesia
- Region: Flores
- Ethnicity: Riung and Baar
- Native speakers: (14,000 cited 1981)
- Language family: Austronesian: Malayo-Polynesian; Central–Eastern; Sumba–Flores; Ende–Manggarai; Manggarai–Rembong; Riung

Language codes
- ISO 639-3: riu
- Glottolog: riun1237

Riung is a language of central Flores, in East Nusa Tenggara Province, Indonesia. It has sometimes been considered a dialect of Manggarai to the west, but is only marginally intelligible with it.
