= Kepoʼ language =

Austronesian language spoken in Flores, Indonesia

Kepoʼ
- Native to: Indonesia
- Region: Central Flores
- Native speakers: 6,000 (2010)
- Language family: Austronesian: Malayo-Polynesian; Central–Eastern; Sumba–Flores; Ende–Manggarai; Central Flores; Kepoʼ

Language codes
- ISO 639-3: kuk
- Glottolog: kepo1237
- ELP: Kepo'

Kepoʼ (Kepoq) is a Malayo-Polynesian language spoken on Flores in Indonesia.
