= Rembong language =

Austronesian language spoken in Flores, Indonesia

Rembong
- Native to: Indonesia
- Region: central Flores
- Native speakers: 5,000 (2010)
- Language family: Austronesian: Malayo-Polynesian; Central–Eastern; Sumba–Flores; Ende–Manggarai; Manggarai–Rembong; Rembong
- Dialects: Namu; Rembong; Wangka

Language codes
- ISO 639-3: reb
- Glottolog: remb1250
- ELP: Rembong

Rembong is a language of central Flores, in East Nusa Tenggara Province, Indonesia.
