= Soa =

Soa may refer to:

== Places ==
=== Scotland ===
- Soa, Tiree, a tidal island of Tiree, Argyll and Bute
- Soa Island, an islet lying south of Iona, Argyll and Bute, Scotland
- Soa, an island in the United Kingdom near Coll, in Argyll and Bute

=== Elsewhere ===
- Soa (Phrygia), an ancient town now in Turkey
- Soa, Cameroon, a town in Centre region
- Soa Airport, in Bajawa, Indonesia
- Søo, a river in Norway, also known as the Søa

== Other uses ==
- Soa (barklice), a genus in the family Lepidopsocidae
- Soa Palelei (born 1977), Australian mixed martial artist
- Soa de Muse (born 1989), French drag queen

== See also ==
- SOA (disambiguation)
- SOAS (disambiguation)
