= Mengurada Hot Spring =

Thermal springs in Indonesia

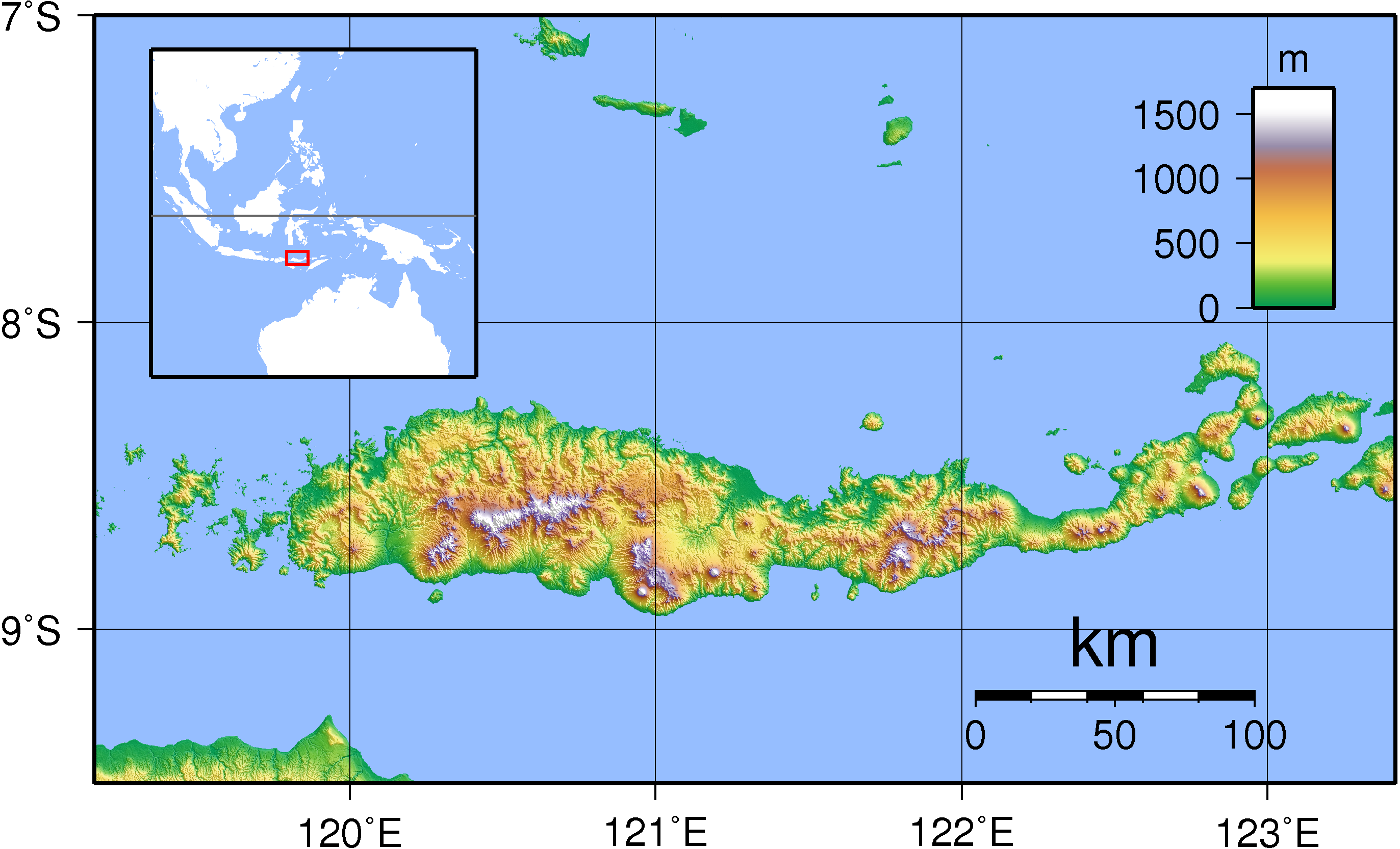
Flores Island in which Mengurada Hot Spring is Located

Mengurada Hot Spring is one of the hot springs for tourism located in Mengeruda, Bajawa City, Ngada Region, Flores Island, Indonesia. The hot spring comes from Mount Inelika, Bajawa. The hot spring water in this resort is known to have medical effects such as curing deceases, especially skin deceases due to its heat temperature which is similar to that of therapy spas. Besides its temperature, the water also contains sulfur and other vulvanic materials which also gives medical effects.
