= Jane Granby =

American artist

Jane Granby is an American artist (b. October 7, 1975) based in San Diego, California. Granby’s work includes painting, photography, and works of mixed media. Her work is often autobiographical including emotions ranging from pain to joy.

== Biography ==
Jane Granby was born in San Diego, California. She started her art career early in life at Zamorano Fine Arts Academy and San Diego School of Creative and Performing Arts. She received a B.A. in Art in 1997 from University of California, Los Angeles (UCLA) where she studied with artists including Don Suggs, John Baldessari, Henry Hopkins, Roger Herman, and Barbara Drucker.

Granby has been undergoing treatment for a cancerous brain tumor since she was twelve years of age. Out of all the kids she went through cancer with, she is the only one that did not go into remission or pass away. She is still fighting the same brain tumor today. After years of continued health problems, she was diagnosed with parkinsonism in 2016.

When asked about her work, Granby will most often provide her Artist’s Statement: "I Do Not Have Cancer, My Body Does".

   My fingers slowly moved along the small bumps. My fingers would have to adjust since my eyes could not. At twelve I was in a blind school learning Braille. I was rapidly losing my sight and my dream to be an artist. I was adjusting to a new world, a world without sight, a world without color. My heart ached. I had a brain tumor eating away at my optic nerve. It was eating away at my sight and my dreams, but I would not let it eat away at my heart, soul, or my love for God. I prayed.
   My prayers were answered. I regained my sight, no medical explanation. My doctors were baffled. One doctor admitted that "some people would call this a miracle." I agree with that doctor. I believe in miracles. I believe that God granted me my sight as a reminder of His power and grace but has not removed my cancerous brain tumor in order to teach me.
   He has taught me faith. He has taught me that I do not have cancer, my body has cancer. He has taught me to say thank you. I say thank you through prayer and with my art.
   Once my sight returned, I remember seeing color so much more vibrantly, so much more beautifully. My art is a celebration of those colors, a celebration of vision and healing. Art does not heal the body, it heals the soul. We will not take our bodies to heaven, but we will take our souls, so I paint and I pray.

== Awards and achievements ==
- 2007-Awarded Cancer Survivor Hero Medal, The American Cancer Society
- 1994-Painting Everlasting Life reviewed for album cover of The Cure’s album Wild Mood Swings
- 1990-Courage Award presented by the American Cancer Society
- 1990-San Diego Artwalk, Winner
- 1988-American Society on Aging Photography Contest, First Place
- 1988-The City of San Diego Special Commendation by the Mayor in acknowledgement for having artwork chosen to be displayed in a museum in Moscow
- 1988-Artwork selected for "Young Art ’88," a major exhibition at the San Diego Museum of Art

== Exhibitions ==
Since 1988, Granby’s works have been included in group exhibitions in Los Angeles at The T. Heritage Gallery, The Wight Art Gallery, Kerkoff Art Gallery, The White Room Gallery at UCLA, Long Beach Arts and Whittier Art Gallery. She took a break from exhibiting her art, due to health issues, from 2008-2025. She has had numerous solo and group exhibitions in San Diego, California. Jane Granby’s solo exhibitions include:

- 2025, November:Jane Granby, Gelato Vero Caffe, San Diego, CA
- 2007-2008: Jane Granby, Girls From the Park, San Diego, CA
- 2005: Photography, Shakespeare’s, San Diego, CA
- 2004: Jane Granby, Café Loma, San Diego, CA
- 2003: British Tea Party, Shakespeare’s, San Diego, CA
- 2001: A Journey: People, Place, Cats, Prime Cuts Gallery, San Diego, CA
- 2000: Happy Day, The San Diego Marriott, San Diego, CA
- 1997-1998: Jane Granby, Boardwalk Studios, San Diego, CA
- 1995: Faces, The Lyceum Theatre, San Diego, CA
- 1995: Beyond, The Cross Cultural Center at the University of California, San Diego, CA
- 1995: The Dance of Life, Price Center at the University of California, San Diego, CA

== Publications/References ==
- 2016, One of her photographs was published in Lol Tolhurst's book Cured: The Tale of Two Imaginary Boys
- November 18, 2005, Press-Telegram, "’National Open’ Mixes the Ho-Hum with the Outstanding"
- May 18, 1995, The Guardian, "Student Art Stolen From Price Center’s Ballroom Lounge"
- November 17, 1994, The Beacon, "Point Loma Woman Fights Cancer With Her Art"
- November 1, 1994, Daily Bruin, "’Looking Beyond’ Exhibit Highlights Art, Not Artist"
- October 27, 1993, Daily Bruin, "Exhibit Showcases Talent of Disabled Artists"
- Summer 1988, Generations: Journal of the American Society on Aging, "Photo Contest Winners" (First Place)
