= School of the Arts =

School of the Arts may refer to:

== United States ==
=== California ===
- Coronado School of the Arts, Coronado
- Los Angeles County High School for the Arts
- Orange County High School of the Arts, Santa Ana
- Roosevelt School of the Arts, Fresno
- San Diego School of Creative and Performing Arts
- San Francisco School of the Arts

=== New York ===
- Brooklyn High School of the Arts
- Columbia University School of the Arts, New York City
- Frank Sinatra School of the Arts, Long Island City
- School of the Arts (Rochester, New York)

=== Other states ===
- Charleston County School of the Arts, South Carolina
- Denver School of the Arts, Colorado
- Douglas Anderson School of the Arts, Jacksonville, Florida
- Dreyfoos School of the Arts, West Palm Beach, Florida
- Duke Ellington School of the Arts, Washington, D.C.
- Durham School of the Arts, North Carolina
- North Carolina School of the Arts
- Tacoma School of the Arts, Washington
- York County School of the Arts, Virginia

== Other countries ==
- College of the Arts, Windhoek, Namibia
- School of the Arts, Singapore
- Victoria School of the Arts, Edmonton, Canada

== See also ==
- List of art schools
- School of Art and Design (disambiguation)
- School of Arts (disambiguation)
- School of Creative and Performing Arts (disambiguation)
- SOA (disambiguation)
