= Bajawa Airport =

Bajawa Airport may refer to:

- Bajawa Soa Airport
- Bajawa Pahdamaleda Airport
