= SCPA =

SCPA may refer to:

- San Diego School of Creative and Performing Arts, a school in San Diego, California
- School for Creative and Performing Arts, a school in Cincinnati, Ohio
- Semiconductor Chip Protection Act of 1984
- South Carolina Ports Authority
- Space Canine Patrol Agents, fictional canine superheroes in DC Comics
- C5a peptidase, an enzyme
- S.C.p.A., or Società consortile per azioni, a type of legal entity in Italy

== See also ==
- School of Creative and Performing Arts (disambiguation)
