= School of Creative and Performing Arts =

School of Creative and Performing Arts or School for Performing and Visual Arts, and variations, may refer to:

== United States ==
- Booker T. Washington High School for the Performing and Visual Arts, Dallas, Texas
- Emerson School for Visual and Performing Arts, Gary, Indiana
- High School for the Performing and Visual Arts, Houston, Texas
- High School of Performing Arts, in New York, New York
- Las Vegas Academy of International Studies, Performing, and Visual Arts, Las Vegas, Nevada
- Philadelphia High School for the Creative and Performing Arts, a high school in Philadelphia, Pennsylvania
- Ramon C. Cortines School of Visual and Performing Arts, Los Angeles, California
- San Diego School of Creative and Performing Arts, a school in San Diego, California

== Other ==
- Etobicoke School of the Arts, Toronto, Ontario
- Philippine High School for the Arts, Mount Makiling, Los Baños, Laguna
- Victoria School of Performing and Visual Arts, Edmonton, Alberta
- Humber School of Creative and Performing Arts, of Humber College, Toronto, Ontario

== See also ==
- School of the Arts (disambiguation)
- SCPA (disambiguation)
