= Rhyopsocus bentonae =

Scientific classification
- Domain: Eukaryota
- Kingdom: Animalia
- Phylum: Arthropoda
- Class: Insecta
- Order: Psocodea
- Family: Psoquillidae
- Genus: Rhyopsocus
- Species: R. bentonae

Binomial name
- Rhyopsocus bentonae Sommerman, 1956

Species of booklouse

Rhyopsocus bentonae is a species of bird nest barklouse in the family Psoquillidae. It is found in Central America and North America.
