= WATB =

WATB may refer to:

- Turelelo Soa Airport (ICAO code: WATB), an airport in Bajawa, Indonesia
- WATB-LP, an Atlanta, Georgia radio station
- WWSZ (former callsign WATB), an Atlanta-area AM broadcast station licensed to Decatur, Georgia
