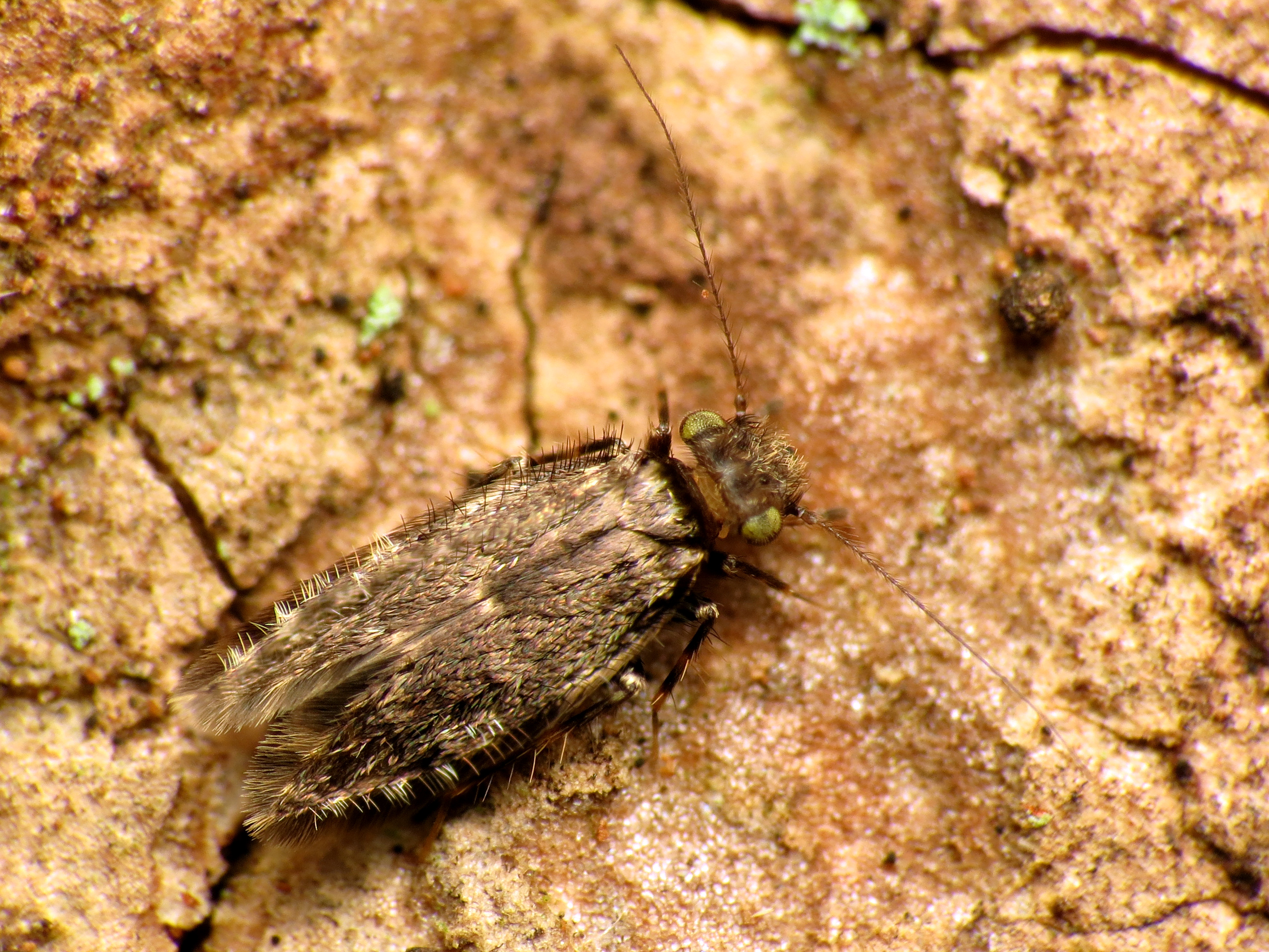

Scientific classification
- Kingdom: Animalia
- Phylum: Arthropoda
- Clade: Pancrustacea
- Class: Insecta
- Order: Psocodea
- Family: Lepidopsocidae
- Genus: Echmepteryx
- Species: E. hageni

Binomial name
- Echmepteryx hageni (Packard, 1870)

= Echmepteryx hageni =

Species of insect

Echmepteryx hageni is a species of scaly-winged barklouse in the family Lepidopsocidae. It is found in North America and native to eastern North America where it naturally inhabits tree trunks, branches, and stone outcrops where it feeds on fungal growths and organic debris and also lays its eggs.
