= Echmepteryx intermedia =

Scientific classification
- Kingdom: Animalia
- Phylum: Arthropoda
- Clade: Pancrustacea
- Class: Insecta
- Order: Psocodea
- Family: Lepidopsocidae
- Genus: Echmepteryx
- Species: E. intermedia

Binomial name
- Echmepteryx intermedia Mockford, 1974

Species of booklouse

Echmepteryx intermedia is a species of scaly-winged barklouse in the family Lepidopsocidae. It is found in the Caribbean Sea, Central America, and North America.
