= BJW =

BJW may refer to:

- the IATA code for Bajawa Soa Airport, Indonesia
- Big Japan Pro Wrestling
