= Salem Mitchell =

American model (born 1998)

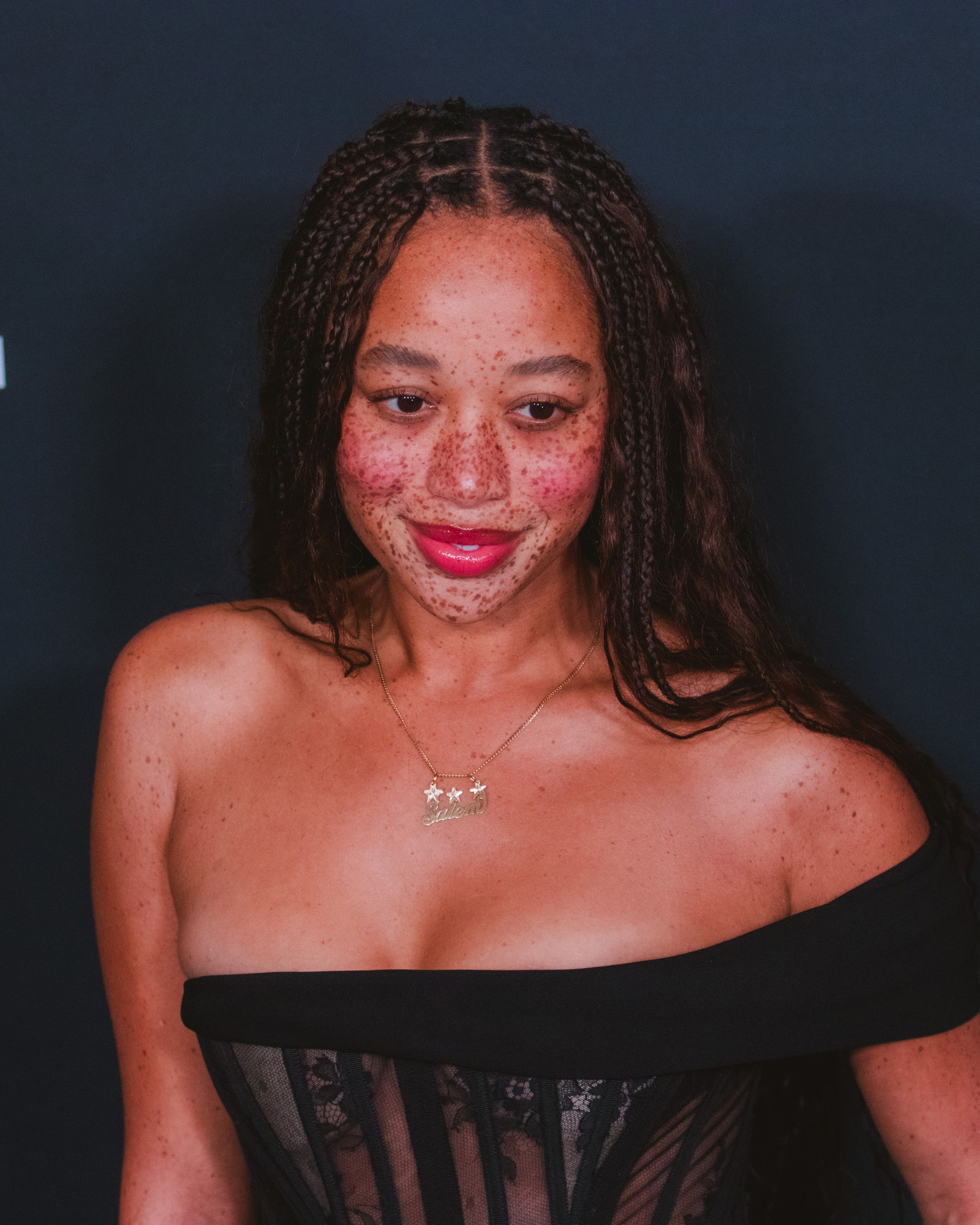
- Mitchell in 2026
- Born: 1998 (age 27–28); San Diego, California, US
- Modeling information
- Height: 5 ft 6.5 in (169 cm)
- Hair color: Dark Brown
- Eye color: Brown
- Agency: Freedom Models (Los Angeles)

Salem Mitchell (born 1998) is an American model and entrepreneur. She is widely recognized for her distinctive facial freckles. Mitchell first gained prominence after being discovered on Instagram by photographer Mayan Toledano. She is currently signed to Freedom Models LA. In addition to her modeling career, she is an outspoken advocate for the representation of young woman of color within the fashion industry.

== Early life and education ==
Mitchell was born and raised in San Diego, California and is of African American and Filipino descent. She studied dance at the San Diego School of Creative and Performing Arts, graduating in 2016. Following high school, she enrolled at San Diego State University to study business and marketing.

== Career ==
=== Modeling ===
Mitchell amassed a large following through Instagram. In 2016, she posted a selfie on Twitter juxtaposed with a bruised banana, responding to online trolls who has harassed her by comparing her freckles to the overripe fruit. After the photo went viral, photographer Mayan Toledano contacted Mitchell through Instagram and invited her to participate in a bedroom photo shoot in San Diego. The resulting pictures were published in Paper Magazine's Youth Issue in April 2018, which helped launch her career. Shortly after her digital discovery, Mitchell signed with Ford Models in February 2018.

Beyond her editorial work, Mitchell has fronted commercial campaigns for many prominent global retailers, including Abercrombie & Fitch, American Eagle, Converse, Forever 21, Gap, Gucci, H&M, Heaven by Marc Jacobs, Levi's, Madhappy, Nike, Maison Margiela, Savage X Fenty, Tommy Jeans, and Urban Outfitters. She was also personally requested by Beyoncé to model official merchandise for the album Lemonade Mitchell secured her first magazine cover feature for Numéro Berlin, and she has appeared in music videos for prominent musical artists such as SZA and Cardi B. Currently, her modeling career is represented by Freedom Models LA.

== Activism ==
Throughout her career, Mitchell has frequently spoken out against cyberbullying and racism in the fashion industry. In 2018, internet commenters targeted her facial freckles and labeled her appearance as "ghetto". In response, she posted a public statement on her instagram story highlighting cultural appropriation and the systematic devaluation of African-American women; her commentary was subsequently covered by Teen Vogue

In 2019, Mitchell Transitioned into sustainable design by collaborating with ethical fashion brand Known Supply to launch a limited edition, eco-friendly apparel capsule titled "Only Human". She continues to advocate for environmental and ethical production practices within the garment industry

== Accolades ==
- 2019 - Nominee, Best of Social Media, Fashion, 11th Shorty Awards

== Videography ==
=== Music videos ===
| Year | Title | Artist(s) | Ref. |
|---|---|---|---|
| 2017 | "Broken Clocks" | SZA | |
| 2018 | "Bartier Cardi" | Cardi B | |
| 2021 | "Brutal" | Olivia Rodrigo | |
| 2022 | "Love Overgrown" | Raveena | |
| 2024 | "360" | Charli XCX | |

=== Other audio ===
Mitchell was featured as a background vocalist for Khalid's "Salem's Interlude" on his debut EP, Suncity.
