= Pteroxanium kelloggi =

Scientific classification
- Kingdom: Animalia
- Phylum: Arthropoda
- Class: Insecta
- Order: Psocodea
- Family: Lepidopsocidae
- Genus: Pteroxanium
- Species: P. kelloggi

Binomial name
- Pteroxanium kelloggi (Ribaga, 1905)

Species of booklouse

Pteroxanium kelloggi is a species of bark louse in the Lepidopsocidae family of the order Psocoptera. It can be found in France, Great Britain, Ireland, and Madeira. It is brownish-orange with white spots and is similar to Cerobasis guestfalica.

== Habitat ==
The species feed on ash, cedar, gorse, ivy, larch, oak, pine, and yew. They also feed on plants such as rhododendrons. They can also be found on decayed fence-posts, foxglove seed-heads, under logs, and leaf litter.
