= Rhyopsocus eclipticus =

- Adult from Maryland, USA

Scientific classification
- Kingdom: Animalia
- Phylum: Arthropoda
- Clade: Pancrustacea
- Class: Insecta
- Order: Psocodea
- Family: Psoquillidae
- Genus: Rhyopsocus
- Species: R. eclipticus

Binomial name
- Rhyopsocus eclipticus Hagen, 1876

Species of booklouse

Rhyopsocus eclipticus is a species of bird nest barklouse in the family Psoquillidae. It is found in North America and Europe.
