= WRKB (disambiguation) =

WRKB may refer to:

- WRKB, a radio station licensed to Kannapolis, North Carolina, USA
- WRFX, a radio station licensed to Kannapolis, North Carolina which used the call sign WRKB-FM between 1964 and 1982
- Pahdamaleda Airport, in Indonesia
