= Echmepteryx madagascariensis =

Scientific classification
- Domain: Eukaryota
- Kingdom: Animalia
- Phylum: Arthropoda
- Class: Insecta
- Order: Psocodea
- Family: Lepidopsocidae
- Genus: Echmepteryx
- Species: E. madagascariensis

Binomial name
- Echmepteryx madagascariensis (Kolbe, 1885)

Species of booklouse

Echmepteryx madagascariensis is a species of scaly-winged barklouse in the family Lepidopsocidae. It is found in Africa, Australia, the Caribbean Sea, Europe and Northern Asia (excluding China), Central America, North America, Oceania, South America, and Southern Asia.
