= Neolepolepis occidentalis =

Scientific classification
- Domain: Eukaryota
- Kingdom: Animalia
- Phylum: Arthropoda
- Class: Insecta
- Order: Psocodea
- Family: Lepidopsocidae
- Genus: Neolepolepis
- Species: N. occidentalis

Binomial name
- Neolepolepis occidentalis (Mockford, 1955)

Species of booklouse

Neolepolepis occidentalis is a species of scaly-winged barklouse in the family Lepidopsocidae. It is found in North America.
