= Thylacella cubana =

Scientific classification
- Domain: Eukaryota
- Kingdom: Animalia
- Phylum: Arthropoda
- Class: Insecta
- Order: Psocodea
- Family: Lepidopsocidae
- Genus: Thylacella
- Species: T. cubana

Binomial name
- Thylacella cubana (Banks, 1941)

Species of booklouse

Thylacella cubana is a species of scaly-winged barklouse in the family Lepidopsocidae. It is found in the Caribbean Sea, Central America, and North America.
