= Rhyopsocus =

- Rhyopsocus eclipticus adult from Maryland, USA

Scientific classification
- Kingdom: Animalia
- Phylum: Arthropoda
- Clade: Pancrustacea
- Class: Insecta
- Order: Psocodea
- Family: Psoquillidae
- Genus: Rhyopsocus; Hagen, 1876

Genus of booklice

Rhyopsocus is a genus of bird nest barklice in the family Psoquillidae. There are more than 20 described species in Rhyopsocus.

== Species ==
These 24 species belong to the genus Rhyopsocus:

- Rhyopsocus afer (Badonnel, 1948)
- Rhyopsocus bentonae Sommerman, 1956
- Rhyopsocus bicornis Badonnel, 1986
- Rhyopsocus calakmulensis Garcia Aldrete, 1999
- Rhyopsocus celtis Mockford, 2016
- Rhyopsocus concavus Garcia Aldrete, 1987
- Rhyopsocus conformis Smithers, 1969
- Rhyopsocus confusus Turner, 1975
- Rhyopsocus disparilis (Pearman, 1931)
- Rhyopsocus eclipticus Hagen, 1876
- Rhyopsocus grandiphallus Turner, 1975
- Rhyopsocus maculosus Garcia Aldrete, 1984
- Rhyopsocus madagascariensis Badonnel, 1967
- Rhyopsocus micropterus Mockford, 1971
- Rhyopsocus nidicola Baz, 1990
- Rhyopsocus ocotensis Garcia Aldrete, 1999
- Rhyopsocus orthatus Thornton & Woo, 1973
- Rhyopsocus pandanicola Thornton, Lee & Chui, 1972
- Rhyopsocus peregrinus (Pearman, 1929)
- Rhyopsocus plesiafer Turner & Cheke, 1983
- Rhyopsocus quercus Mockford, 2016
- Rhyopsocus rafaeli Garcia Aldrete, 2004
- Rhyopsocus spheciophilus (Enderlein, 1903)
- Rhyopsocus texanus (Banks, 1930)
