= School of Arts =

School of Arts or school of arts may refer to:

- Art school, an educational institution with a primary focus on the visual arts
- Mechanics' institutes, Victorian-era educational establishments formed to provide education, particularly in technical subjects, to working men, sometimes called School of Arts
- School of Arts, Lahore, Pakistan
- School of Arts of Edinburgh, the forerunner of Mechanics' institutes
- School of Arts, part of Hogeschool Gent

== See also ==
- School of Art and Design (disambiguation)
- School of Arts and Crafts of Toledo, 19th century school for the training of artists and craftsmen in Toledo, Spain
- School of the Arts (disambiguation)
- Yale School of Art, first professional art school in the U.S.
