= Pteroxanium =

Scientific classification
- Domain: Eukaryota
- Kingdom: Animalia
- Phylum: Arthropoda
- Class: Insecta
- Order: Psocodea
- Family: Lepidopsocidae
- Subfamily: Lepidopsocinae
- Genus: Pteroxanium; Enderlein, 1922

Genus of booklice

Pteroxanium is a genus of scaly-winged barklice in the family Lepidopsocidae. There are about eight described species in Pteroxanium.

== Species ==
These eight species belong to the genus Pteroxanium:

- Pteroxanium evansi Smithers, Courtenay & Thornton, 1974^{c g}
- Pteroxanium forcepetum Garcia Aldrete, 1984^{c g}
- Pteroxanium funebre Badonnel, 1963^{c g}
- Pteroxanium insularum Smithers, Courtenay & Thornton, 1974^{c g}
- Pteroxanium kelloggi (Ribaga, 1905)^{i c g b}
- Pteroxanium marrisi Smithers, Courtenay, 2000^{c g}
- Pteroxanium oaxacanum Garcia Aldrete, 1985^{c g}
- Pteroxanium ralstonae Smithers, Courtenay & Thornton, 1974^{c g}

Data sources: i = ITIS, c = Catalogue of Life, g = GBIF, b = Bugguide.net
