= Bajawa =

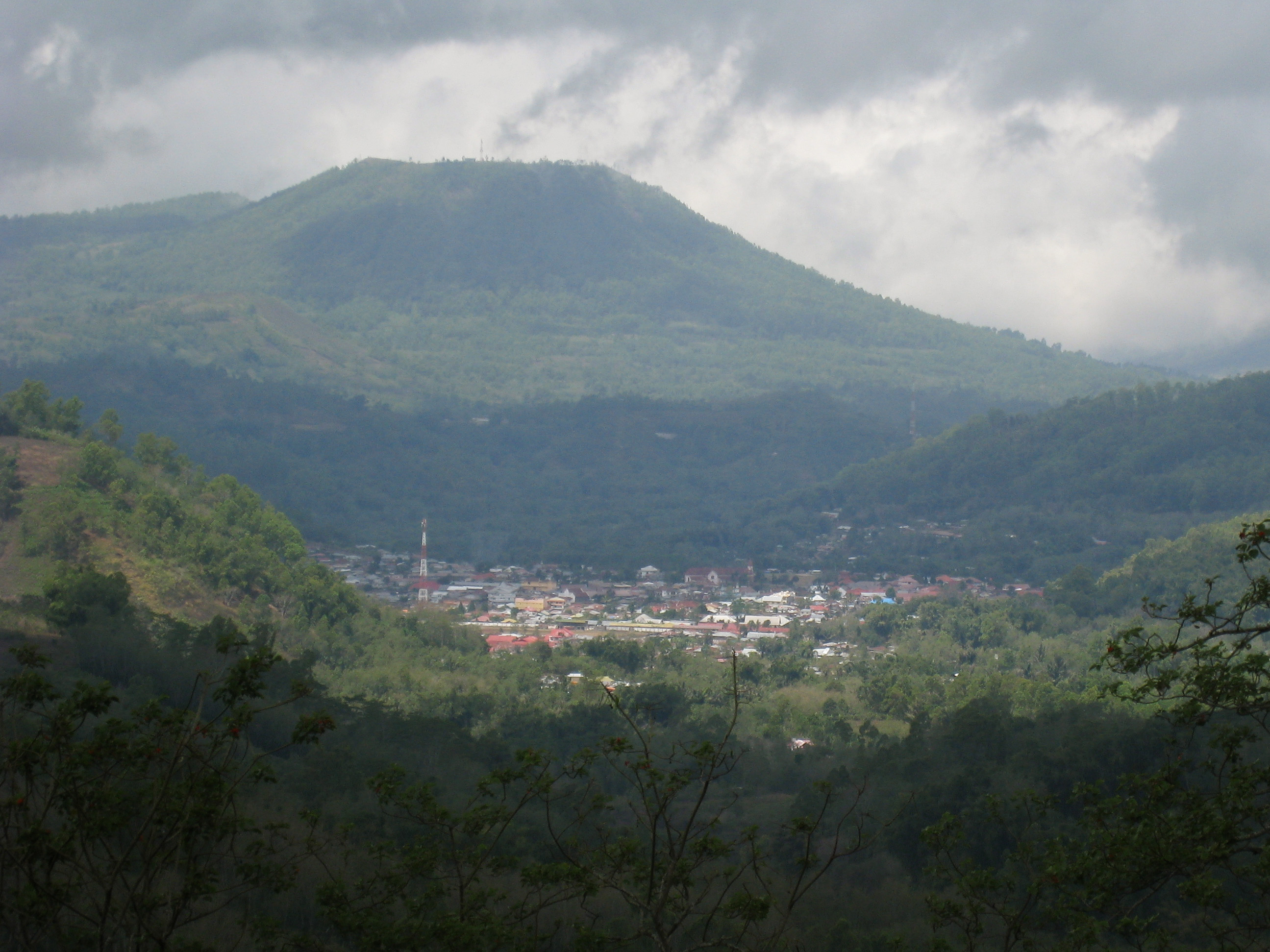
- Bajawa

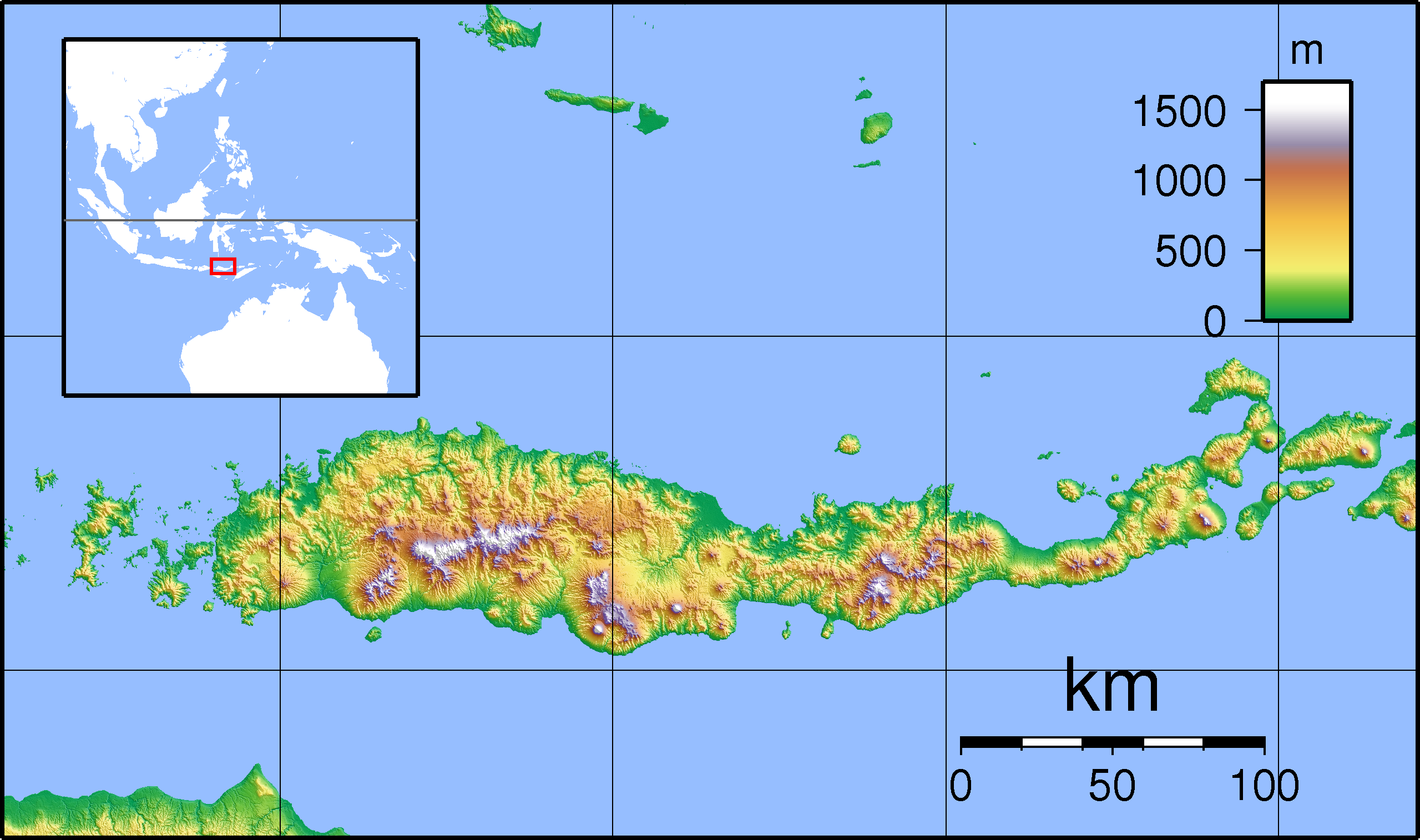
- Location in Indonesia Bajawa (Indonesia)
- Country: Indonesia
- Region: Lesser Sunda Islands
- Province: East Nusa Tenggara
- Regency: Ngada

Area
  - Total: 102.76 km^{2} (39.68 sq mi)

Population (mid 2024 estimate)
  - Total: 39,940
  - Density: 388.7/km^{2} (1,007/sq mi)
- Time zone: UTC+8 (WITA)

Bajawa is a town (kelurahan) and an administrative district (kecamatan) on the island of Flores, Indonesia, and the capital of the Ngada Regency. Ngada Regency is part of East Nusa Tenggara province and located to the east of Ruteng.

Bajawa features natural hot springs which are used for bathing and volcanic scenery due to the proximity of the Inierie volcano some ten km to the south. The population is primarily Roman Catholic.

== Bajawa district ==
Bajawa district has 28 villages, listed below with their populations as at mid 2024:

- Bajawa (2,376)
- Faobata (2,946)
- Tanalodu (2,404)
- Kisanata (1,021)
- Jawameze (1,388)
- Trikora (2,477)
- Ngedukelu (2,489)
- Lebijaga (3,215)
- Susu (1,852)
- Beja (679)
- Bomari (1,025)
- Ubedolumolo (833)
- Beiwali (1,962)
- Wawowae (1,818)
- Naru (2,307)
- Borani (1,196)
- Langagedha (746)
- Pape (649)
- Bowali (858)
- Ngoranale (1,559)
- Bela (921)
- Ubedolumolo I (955)
- Langagedha I (278)
- Ubedolumolo II (998)
- Boradho (670)
- Mukuvoka (564)
- Ngadhamana (911)
- Bolonga (843)
- Total (39.940 ^{(a)})

Bajawa (town), Faobata, Tanalodu, Kisanata, Jawameze, Trikora, Ngedukelu, Lebijaga, Ngedukelu and Susu are urban kelurahan; the other villages are rural desa.

Note: (a) comprising 19,677 males and 20,263 females).

== Transportation ==
The town is served by two minor airports:

- Bajawa Soa Airport
- Bajawa Pahdamaleda Airport

== Climate ==
Bajawa has a cool tropical savanna climate (Aw) with moderate to little rainfall from May to October and heavy to very heavy rainfall from November to April.

Climate data for Bajawa
Month	Jan	Feb	Mar	Apr	May	Jun	Jul	Aug	Sep	Oct	Nov	Dec	Year
Mean daily maximum °C (°F)	24.9 (76.8)	24.6 (76.3)	24.9 (76.8)	25.2 (77.4)	24.6 (76.3)	23.9 (75.0)	23.7 (74.7)	24.1 (75.4)	25.2 (77.4)	26.2 (79.2)	26.1 (79.0)	25.4 (77.7)	24.9 (76.8)
Daily mean °C (°F)	20.2 (68.4)	20.1 (68.2)	20.2 (68.4)	20.2 (68.4)	19.6 (67.3)	18.8 (65.8)	18.2 (64.8)	18.3 (64.9)	19.3 (66.7)	20.4 (68.7)	20.9 (69.6)	20.6 (69.1)	19.7 (67.5)
Mean daily minimum °C (°F)	15.6 (60.1)	15.6 (60.1)	15.5 (59.9)	15.2 (59.4)	14.6 (58.3)	13.7 (56.7)	12.7 (54.9)	12.5 (54.5)	13.4 (56.1)	14.7 (58.5)	15.8 (60.4)	15.8 (60.4)	14.6 (58.3)
Average rainfall mm (inches)	376 (14.8)	308 (12.1)	257 (10.1)	130 (5.1)	86 (3.4)	33 (1.3)	49 (1.9)	26 (1.0)	20 (0.8)	80 (3.1)	170 (6.7)	300 (11.8)	1,835 (72.1)
Source: Climate-Data.org
