= School of Art and Design =

School of Art and Design may refer to:

== United States ==
- Herron School of Art and Design, Indianapolis, Indiana
- High School of Art and Design, Manhattan, New York City
- New England School of Art and Design, Boston, Massachusetts

== United Kingdom ==
- Bath School of Art and Design Bath, England
- Central School of Art and Design (1896–1989), London, England
- Coventry School of Art and Design, Coventry, England
- Nottingham Trent University, School of Art and Design, Nottingham, England
- Putney School of Art and Design Putney, London, England

== Other countries ==
- Limerick School of Art and Design, Limerick, Ireland
- Joshibi High School of Art and Design, Tokyo, Japan
- School of Art and Design (Łódź), Poland

== See also ==
- National Association of Schools of Art and Design
- School of Arts (disambiguation)
- School of the Arts (disambiguation)
- School of Design (disambiguation)
