= Neolepolepis =

Scientific classification
- Domain: Eukaryota
- Kingdom: Animalia
- Phylum: Arthropoda
- Class: Insecta
- Order: Psocodea
- Family: Lepidopsocidae
- Subfamily: Lepidopsocinae
- Genus: Neolepolepis; Mockford, 1993

Genus of booklice

Neolepolepis is a genus of scaly-winged barklice in the family Lepidopsocidae. There are at least four described species in Neolepolepis.

== Species ==
These four species belong to the genus Neolepolepis:

- Neolepolepis caribensis (Turner, 1975)
- Neolepolepis leticiae (Garcia Aldrete, 1984)
- Neolepolepis occidentalis (Mockford, 1955)
- Neolepolepis xerica (Garcia Aldrete, 1984)
