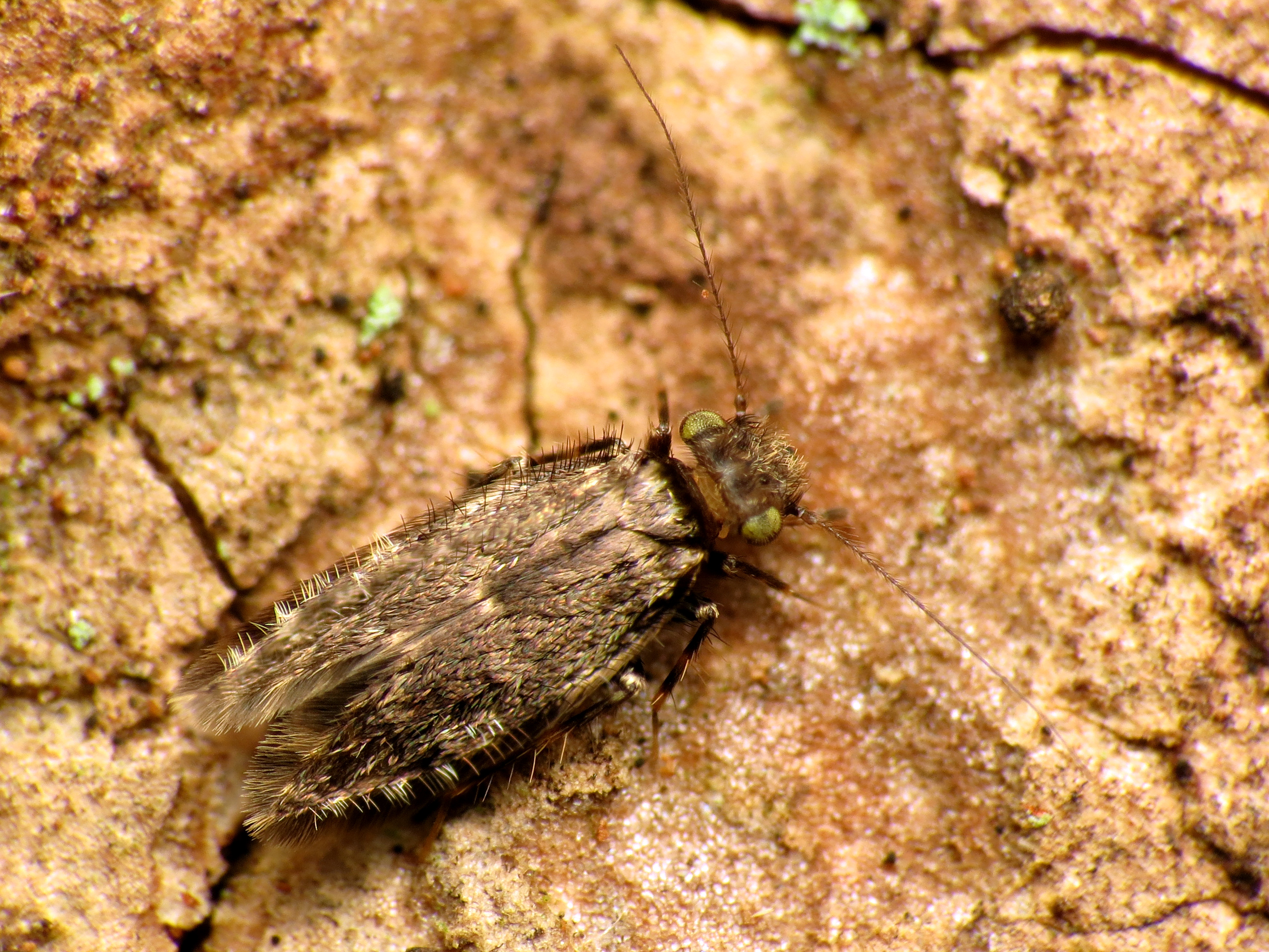
- Echmepteryx hageni

Scientific classification
- Domain: Eukaryota
- Kingdom: Animalia
- Phylum: Arthropoda
- Class: Insecta
- Order: Psocodea
- Family: Lepidopsocidae
- Genus: Echmepteryx; Aaron, 1886

= Echmepteryx =

Genus of booklice

Echmepteryx is a genus of scaly-winged barklice in the family Lepidopsocidae. There are more than 80 described species in Echmepteryx.

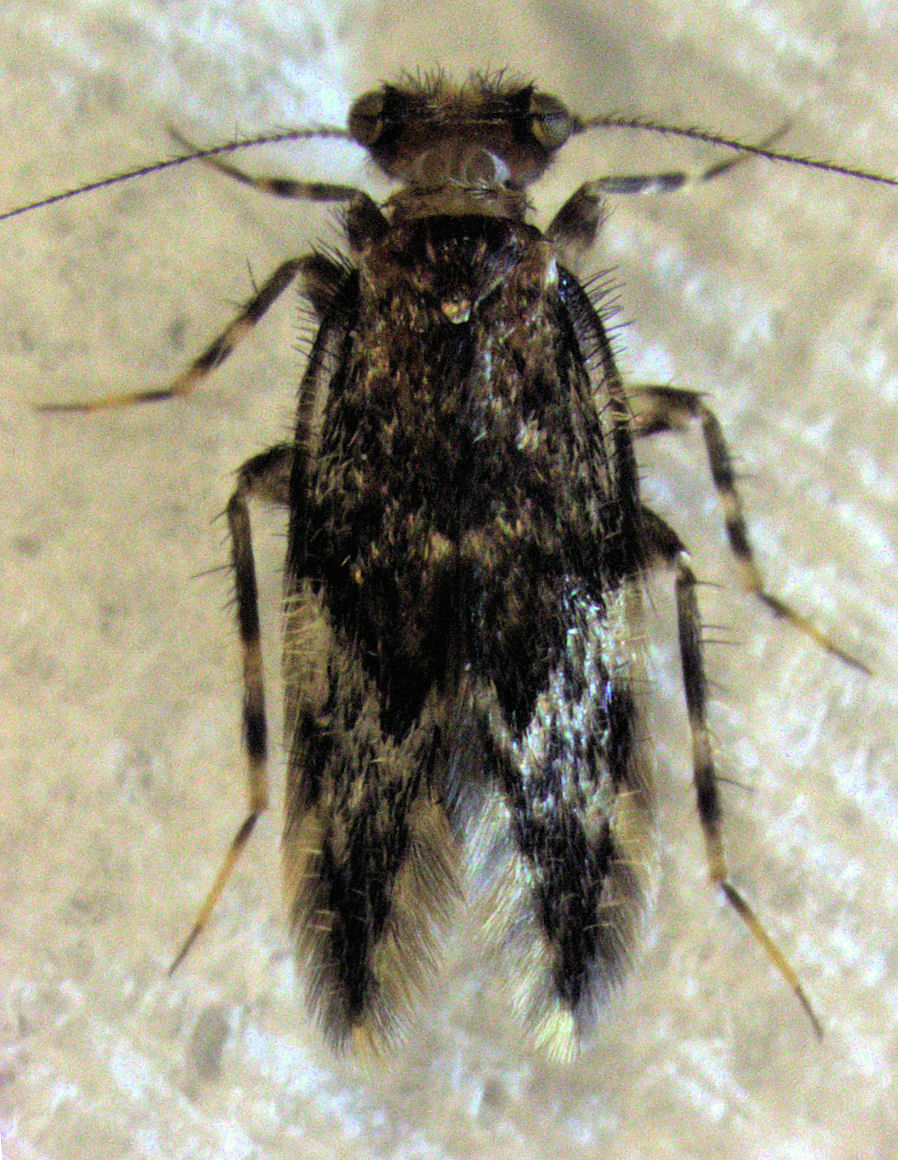
Echmepteryx hamiltoni

== Species ==
These 81 species belong to the genus Echmepteryx:

- Echmepteryx acuminata Turner, 1975
- Echmepteryx acutipennis Enderlein, 1931
- Echmepteryx aesculana Enderlein, 1931
- Echmepteryx albigena Schmidt & Thornton, 1993
- Echmepteryx alpha Garcia Aldrete, 1984
- Echmepteryx angusta New, 1975
- Echmepteryx annulitibia (Enderlein, 1931)
- Echmepteryx anomala Smithers & Thornton, 1975
- Echmepteryx aperta Thornton & Woo, 1973
- Echmepteryx argenta Turner, 1975
- Echmepteryx argentofasciata (Enderlein, 1931)
- Echmepteryx armillata Enderlein, 1910
- Echmepteryx atlantica Mockford, 1989
- Echmepteryx barba Turner, 1975
- Echmepteryx bicolor Turner, 1975
- Echmepteryx bishopi New, 1975
- Echmepteryx brunnea Smithers, 1965
- Echmepteryx carolinensis Thornton, Lee & Chui, 1972
- Echmepteryx chagosensis New, 1977
- Echmepteryx chekei Turner, 1976
- Echmepteryx desquamata Karny, 1932
- Echmepteryx diexquadra Badonnel, 1981
- Echmepteryx dryas (Enderlein, 1931)
- Echmepteryx dybasi Thornton, Lee & Chui, 1972
- Echmepteryx falco (Badonnel, 1949)
- Echmepteryx fastigata (Enderlein, 1931)
- Echmepteryx frontalis Vaughan, Thornton & New, 1991
- Echmepteryx fuscata New, 1975
- Echmepteryx gracilis Mockford, 2012
- Echmepteryx gumpi Thornton, 1990
- Echmepteryx hageni (Packard, 1870)
- Echmepteryx hamiltoni (Tillyard, 1923)
- Echmepteryx hartmeyeri Enderlein, 1907
- Echmepteryx hebes (Enderlein, 1931)
- Echmepteryx hieroglyphica Enderlein, 1931
- Echmepteryx howensis Smithers & Thornton, 1975
- Echmepteryx humphreysi New, 1977
- Echmepteryx intermedia Mockford, 1974
- Echmepteryx lacinipennis Enderlein, 1926
- Echmepteryx lawrencei Smithers, 1995
- Echmepteryx lealae New, 1972
- Echmepteryx lineata Vaughan, Thornton & New, 1991
- Echmepteryx lunulata Thornton, Lee & Chui, 1972
- Echmepteryx lurida Badonnel, 1967
- Echmepteryx lutosa Mockford, 1991
- Echmepteryx macgregori Garcia Aldrete, 1985
- Echmepteryx maculimargo Enderlein, 1931
- Echmepteryx madagascariensis (Kolbe, 1885)
- Echmepteryx mahensis (Enderlein, 1931)
- Echmepteryx malayensis New, 1975
- Echmepteryx mihira Enderlein, 1906
- Echmepteryx montana Turner, 1975
- Echmepteryx monticola (Enderlein, 1931)
- Echmepteryx muscicolis Badonnel, 1977
- Echmepteryx nigra (Enderlein, 1931)
- Echmepteryx nigrapalpa Turner, 1975
- Echmepteryx pacifica Garcia Aldrete, 1985
- Echmepteryx pallida Smithers, 1965
- Echmepteryx pauliani Badonnel, 1967
- Echmepteryx picta Smithers, 1977
- Echmepteryx picticeps Thornton, Lee & Chui, 1972
- Echmepteryx pinnula (Enderlein, 1931)
- Echmepteryx pletschi Garcia Aldrete, 1985
- Echmepteryx psyche (Enderlein, 1931)
- Echmepteryx punctulata (Enderlein, 1931)
- Echmepteryx quadrilineata Smithers, 1965
- Echmepteryx rara Turner, 1975
- Echmepteryx renoides Schmidt & Thornton, 1993
- Echmepteryx schrankeli Garcia Aldrete, 2001
- Echmepteryx scotti (Enderlein, 1931)
- Echmepteryx sericea Enderlein, 1906
- Echmepteryx similis Badonnel, 1955
- Echmepteryx stylesi Smithers, 1969
- Echmepteryx submontana Turner, 1975
- Echmepteryx symmetrolepis (Enderlein, 1912)
- Echmepteryx terricolis Badonnel, 1963
- Echmepteryx unicolor Banks, 1931
- Echmepteryx uniformis Mockford, 1991
- Echmepteryx vitiensis Thornton, 1981
- Echmepteryx yanezi Garcia Aldrete, 1984
- Echmepteryx youngi Mockford, 1974
