= Inierie =

Stratovolcano on the island of Flores, Indonesia

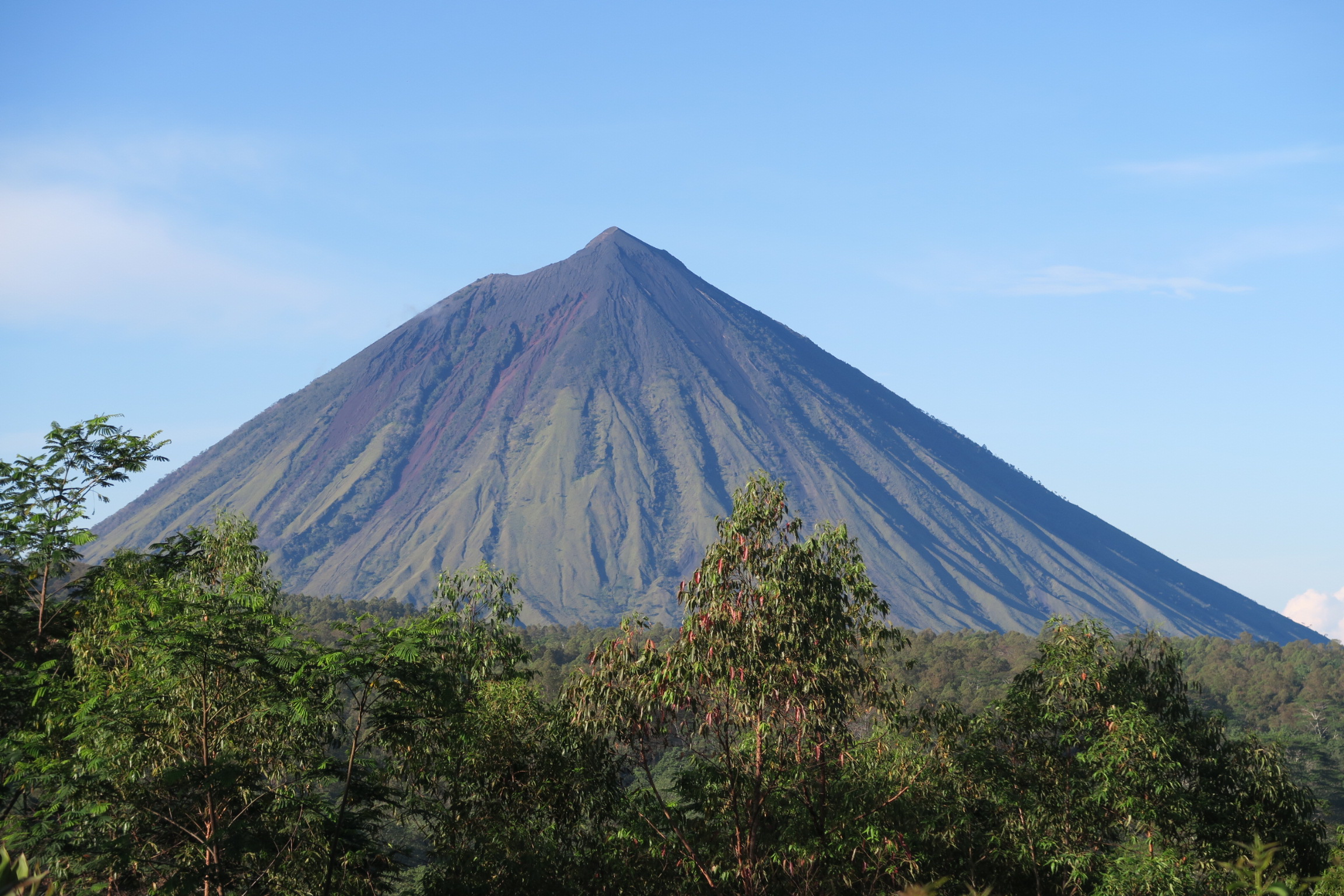
- Inierie

Highest point
- Elevation: 2,245 m (7,365 ft)
- Listing: Ultra; Ribu
- Coordinates: 8.875°S 120.95°E

Geography
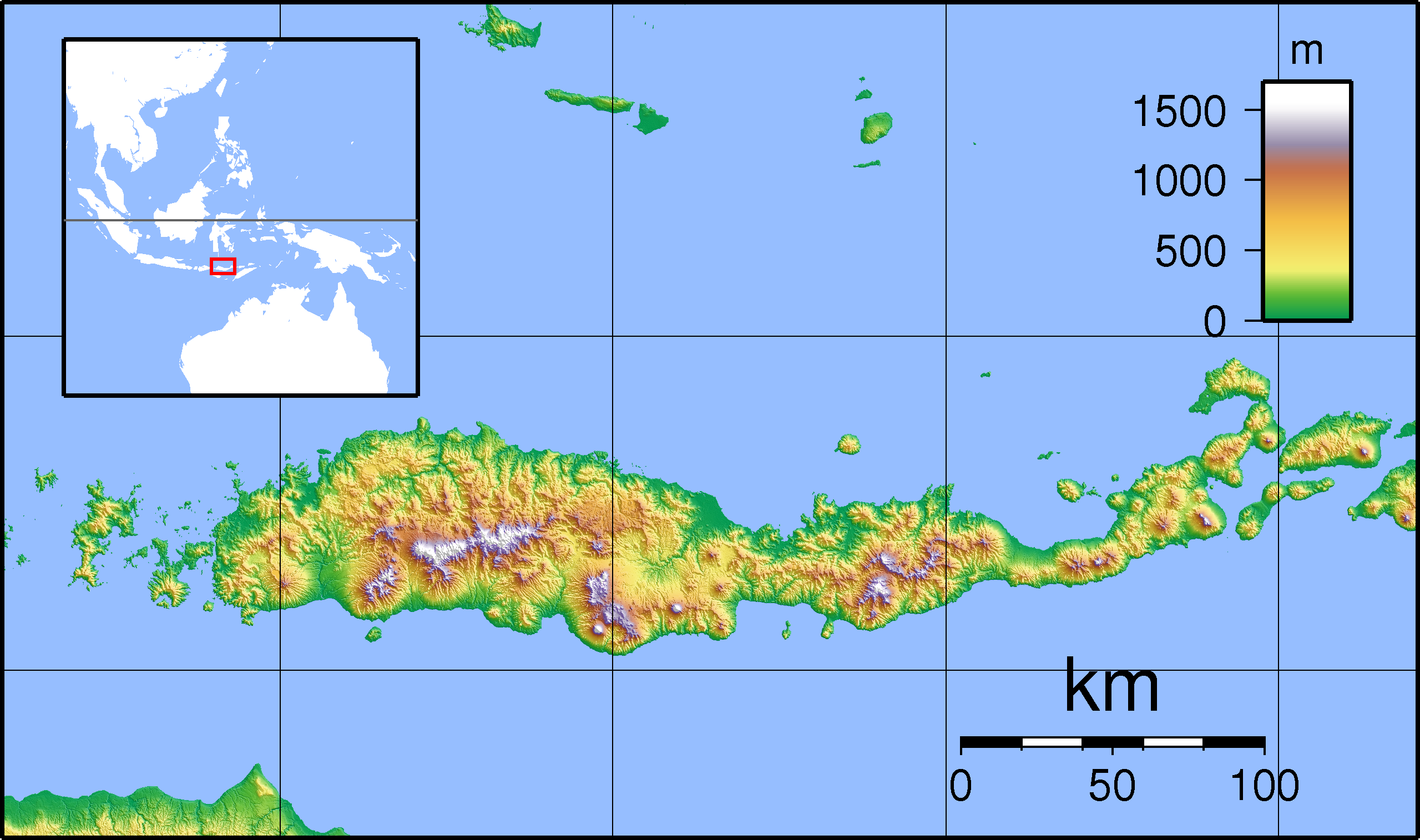
- Location within Flores
- Location: Flores Island, Indonesia

Geology
- Mountain type: Stratovolcano
- Volcanic arc: Sunda Arc
- Last eruption: 8050 BCE ?

Inierie is a stratovolcano located in the south-central part of the island of Flores, Indonesia, overlooking the Savu Sea. It is the highest volcano on the island.

The volcano looms over the little town of Bajawa and its upper slopes are bare without any vegetation.

The volcano is not active but there were reports of smoke emerging from the crater in June 1911.

== See also ==
- List of ultras of the Malay Archipelago
- List of volcanoes in Indonesia
