= SOA =

SOA may refer to:

== Arts, entertainment, and media ==
- Siege of Avalon, a 2000 computer role-playing game
- Soldiers of Anarchy, a 2002 real-time tactics computer game
- Sons of Anarchy, an FX television series about a motorcycle club
- Sons of Azrael, a deathcore band from Buffalo, New York
- State of Alert, a hardcore punk group formed in Washington, D.C.

== Computing and technology ==
- Safe operating area, the recommended voltage and current conditions for a semiconductor
- Semiconductor optical amplifier
- Service-oriented architecture, a set of software design principles and methodologies
  - SOA governance, a concept for services control in such an architecture
  - SOA security
- SOA record (for start of authority), a type of resource record in the Domain Name System (DNS)
- Statement of Applicability (SoA), an ISO/IEC 27001 document for information security management systems
- Structure of arrays, a method of arranging records in memory

== Enterprises and organizations ==
- School of the Americas, now the Western Hemisphere Institute for Security Cooperation, a U.S. Department of Defense training facility
- Siksha 'O' Anusandhan (SOA University), Bhubaneswar, Odisha, India
- Security and Intelligence Agency, (Croatian: Sigurnosno-obavještajna agencija or SOA), in Croatia
- Scottish Orienteering Association
- Society of Actuaries, in North America
- Society of Ancients, a UK-based ancient and medieval history and war gaming organization
- Society of Authors, a British writers' trade union
- Spirit of America (charity), a US non-governmental nonprofit organization promoting American values abroad
- Special Operations Australia, a.k.a. Services Reconnaissance Department, a World War II agency
- Special operating agency, a Canadian governmental organization
- State Oceanic Administration, a Chinese administrative agency
- Subaru of America, American distributor of Subaru vehicles
- Swiss Olympic Association

== Sports ==
- SOA (basketball club), in Yamoussoukro, Ivory Coast
- SOA (football club), in Yamoussoukro, Ivory Coast

== Other uses ==
- Secondary organic aerosol, a type of particulate matter produced by combustion engines
- Southampton Airport Parkway railway station, in Eastleigh, Hampshire, England
- Stimulus onset asynchrony, a measure used in experimental psychology
- Super output areas, geographical regions defined in the U.K. ONS coding system
- Statement of account

== See also ==
- Soa (disambiguation)
- School of the Arts (disambiguation)
- SOAS (disambiguation)
