= Thylacella =

Scientific classification
- Domain: Eukaryota
- Kingdom: Animalia
- Phylum: Arthropoda
- Class: Insecta
- Order: Psocodea
- Family: Lepidopsocidae
- Genus: Thylacella; Enderlein, 1911

Genus of booklice

Thylacella is a genus of scaly-winged barklice in the family Lepidopsocidae. There are at least 20 described species in Thylacella.

== Species ==
These 20 species belong to the genus Thylacella:

- Thylacella acutipennis Badonnel, 1967
- Thylacella angulifrons Badonnel, 1967
- Thylacella angustipennis Broadhead & Richards, 1982
- Thylacella annulata Badonnel, 1976
- Thylacella brasiliensis Mockford, 2005
- Thylacella congolensis (Badonnel, 1949)
- Thylacella cubana (Banks, 1941)
- Thylacella fasciata Badonnel, 1955
- Thylacella fasciifrons Badonnel, 1967
- Thylacella fenestrata Smithers, 1964
- Thylacella huautlensis Garcia Aldrete, 2001
- Thylacella immaculata Badonnel, 1955
- Thylacella madagascariensis Smithers, 1964
- Thylacella montana Badonnel, 1967
- Thylacella pilipennis (Enderlein, 1912)
- Thylacella similis Badonnel, 1967
- Thylacella trifurcata Badonnel, 1976
- Thylacella vitripennis Badonnel, 1967
- † Thylacella eocenica Nel, Prokop, De Ploeg & Millet, 2005 Oise amber, France, Ypresian
- † Thylacella eversiana Enderlein, 1911 Holocene copal, Tanzania
