= School of Design =

School of Design may refer to:

- Carnegie Mellon School of Design
- The School of Design, the organization that stages the annual New Orleans parade, Rex
- University of Pennsylvania School of Design
- Parsons The New School for Design
- South Australian School of Design, a predecessor of the School of Arts at the University of South Australia
- School of Design, Nanyang Polytechnic
- PolyU School of Design

== See also ==
- School of Art and Design (disambiguation)
- Hochschule für Gestaltung
