= SOAS (disambiguation) =

SOAS or Soas or variation, may refer to:

- 427 Special Operations Aviation Squadron, Canadian Special Operations Forces Command, Royal Canadian Air Force, Canadian Armed Forces, Canada
- Oracle SOA Suite, a middleware product for service-oriented architecture from Oracle
- SEAL Officer Assessment and Selection
- University of London:
  - School of Oriental and African Studies (est. 1916; the School of Oriental and African Studies), University of London, London, England, UK
    - SOAS School of Law
  - School of Advanced Study (est. 1994), University of London, London, England, UK

== See also ==
- SoaS Fedora, a respin of Fedora Linux
- School of Advanced Studies (est. 2017), University of Tyumen, Tyumen, Siberia, Russia
- Psoas muscle (soas), a long fusiform muscle located in the lateral lumbar region
- SOA (disambiguation)
