= Soa (barklice) =

Scientific classification
- Kingdom: Animalia
- Phylum: Arthropoda
- Clade: Pancrustacea
- Class: Insecta
- Order: Psocodea
- Family: Lepidopsocidae
- Subfamily: Perientominae
- Genus: Soa; Enderlein, 1904

Genus of booklice

Soa is a genus of scaly-winged barklice in the family Lepidopsocidae. There are about six described species in Soa.

== Species ==
These six species belong to the genus Soa:

- Soa angolana Badonnel, 1955^{c g}
- Soa dahliana Enderlein, 1904^{c g}
- Soa enderleini New, 1977^{c g}
- Soa flaviterminata Enderlein, 1906^{i c g}
- Soa reticulata Thornton & A. K. T. Woo, 1973^{c g}
- Soa violacea New, 1975^{c g}

Data sources: i = ITIS, c = Catalogue of Life, g = GBIF, b = Bugguide.net
