= Madhappy =

American clothing and lifestyle brand

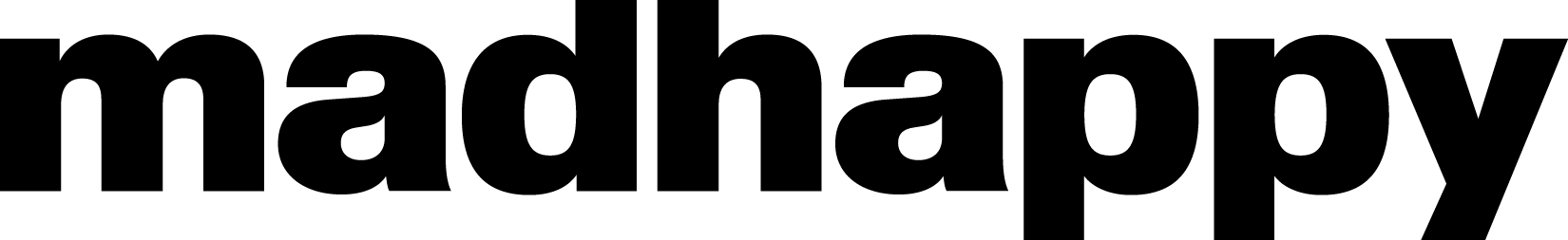
- Type: Private
- Industry: Fashion
- Founded: 2017; 9 years ago
- Founder: Peiman Raf; Noah Raf; Mason Spector; Joshua Sitt
- Headquarters: Los Angeles, California
- Products: Clothing; Shoes; Accessories
- Website: madhappy.com

Madhappy is an American clothing and lifestyle brand established in Los Angeles in 2017. The brand is centered around optimism both locally and globally, and was created with the intention of designing products and experiences that uplift people physically, mentally, and spiritually through digital and physical content and activations. Per their website, Madhappy is clothing for a community of optimists. Since its inception, the brand has been worn by celebrities and cultural influencers including Dua Lipa and Cardi B, among others.

== History ==
Madhappy was founded by Joshua Sitt, Noah Raf, Peiman Raf, and Mason Spector in 2017. Within its first year, the brand launched pop-up locations around New York City and Los Angeles with the intention to spread its optimist message in key local communities. As the brand grew, Madhappy launched additional store locations in New York's Meatpacking District, Aspen, Miami, Los Angeles' Melrose Place, and Abbott Kinney. In October 2019, Madhappy attracted the attention of LVMH Luxury Ventures, leading to a $1.8 million seed round for the brand.

== Collaborations ==
Throughout its history, Madhappy has collaborated with a range of partners such as Paris retailer Collette, apparel partners including Columbia Sportswear, GUESS, Pacific Tote Company, The GAP, and lululemon. Footwear partners including Vans, Salomon, and UGG. Entertainment partners including Pixar, Curb Your Enthusiasm, and Beats by Dre. Restaurant partners including The Apple Pan, MR.CHOW, Roscoe's House of Chicken & Waffles, Courage Bagels, and Jon & Vinny's. Professional sports organizations including the Los Angeles Lakers and the Los Angeles Dodgers.

== Mission and Philanthropy ==
In addition to its products, Madhappy also launched The Madhappy Foundation, a non-profit organization, 501(c)(3) with a mission to improve mental health globally. Through The Madhappy Foundation, 1% of the brand's proceeds from every sale benefit efforts to raise awareness, fund research, and positively impact the mental health movement. Madhappy has partnered with The Jed Foundation, Project Healthy Minds, and The University of Pennsylvania's Positive Psychology Center for conversations, research, and efforts centered on mental health. Additionally, Madhappy announced the establishment of The Madhappy Foundation Pediatric Psychiatric Fund in partnership with Vanderbilt University Medical Center, managed by its Department of Psychiatry and Behavioral Sciences, aiming to develop a childhood anxiety screener. In addition to monetary contributions, Madhappy has launched out-of-home billboard campaigns for mental health initiatives including Mental Health Awareness Month and World Mental Health Day. In 2023, Madhappy launched a print magazine called "Local Optimist", that focuses on mental health awareness, wellness, and art.

== Stores ==
Since its launch, Madhappy has opened seasonal shops in the East Hamptons; the Meatpacking District of Manhattan, New York; Aspen; Miami; Los Angeles' Melrose Place & Abbott Kinney; The Grove; Palisades Village; and Rosewood Miramar Beach. The brand opened its first flagship store in West Hollywood in November 2023 which is still open to this day.
