= Roger Herman =

German painter

- Born: 1947 (age 77–78); Saarland, Germany
- Education: Academy of Fine Arts, Karlsruhe
- Known for: painting, ceramics, printmaking
- Style: Neo-expressionism
- Awards: National Endowment for the Arts; 1976 Fellowship Grant in Painting
- Website: rogerherman.net

Roger Herman (born 1947) is a German painter, ceramicist and printmaker.

== Early life ==
Roger Herman was born in the Franco-German town of Saarbrücken, the son of a French father and German mother. Even though Herman lost his parents at a young age, they would come up later in his life as he repeatedly used old photographs of them as subjects for his painting.

== Education ==
Interested in becoming a Lawyer, Herman studied law and philosophy at the Saarland University from 1969-1971. Unenthusiastic about the notions of law, he decided to focus on art and enrolled in the Academy of Fine Arts, Karlsruhe. Around this time in 1972, Herman and a group of friends opened the Galerie “Am Neumarkt”—a meeting place with art, readings and music performances. He had little experience in art by the time he enrolled, but soon settled into the traditional painting program led by professors such as Gerd van Dülmen, Emil Schumacher, Markus Lüpertz, Georg Baselitz and Per Kirkeby amongst others. He came to realize that Karlsruhe was a painters-painter school and steeped heavily into the historical tradition of painting.

Herman received his MFA in 1976 from the Academy of Fine Arts, Karlsruhe. Soon after graduating, he received a post-graduate grant from the Academic Exchange Service (DAAD). Interested in the work of David Park (painter), Elmer Bischoff and Richard Diebenkorn, Herman decided to move with his wife and child to the Bay Area. In 1981, Herman had become interested in Los Angeles as an art hub and moved. It was during this time that he was also awarded the National Endowment for the Arts Fellowship Grant in Painting.

== Life and career ==
In the early 80's Herman had started carving a name for himself in the international scene when there was a surge of interest in the German Expressionistic style of painting. Using gigantic painting formats with a loose, colorful hand while also integrating wood-block prints, Herman managed to be expressive and conceptual in his work and came to be recognized as the West Coast wing of the '80s Neo-expressionist movement. It was at this time he began a working relationship with Ulrike Kantor in Los Angeles as she was picking up young artist's in the burgeoning scene in Los Angeles. After Kantor closed her gallery, Herman was picked up by Larry Gagosian and exhibited at his West Hollywood gallery. After some time with Gagosian, Herman joined the ranks of Ace Gallery where he began making even larger and more ambitious exhibitions with the now infamous Doug Chrismas.

In the late 80's, Herman became a faculty professor at the UCLA School of the Arts and Architecture together with Chris Burden and Charles Ray at the time—their efforts turning the art school into a hotbed of emerging talent. While teaching at UCLA, he learned how to make ceramic pots. Working alongside his painting, Herman would come to develop a unique methodology of making ceramics, almost as if his paintings and drawings were strewn across curved surfaces

== Black Dragon Society ==
Alongside his art practice, Herman together with friend and Austrian painter Hubert Schmalix and German film maker Chris Sievernich opened an artist run gallery in Downtown Los Angeles' burgeoning Chinatown district in 1998. The gallery, named Black Dragon Society after the Kung Fu Studio that occupied the location, came to be known as the go-to gallery to find up and coming talent. They exhibited many UCLA students at the time such as Nick Lowe, Ry Rocklen, Hannah Greely, Jonas Wood, some of whom would gain notable recognition later in their career.

== Collections ==
Herman is represented in many international collections at museums such as the Los Angeles County Museum of Art; the Museum of Contemporary Art, Los Angeles; the Walker Art Center in Minneapolis; the San Francisco Museum of Modern Art; the Denver Art Museum; the Museo Universitario Arte Contemporáneo, Mexico City; the Albertina museum, Vienna; the Museum of Modern Art, New York; the Hammer Museum, Los Angeles amongst others. He is also in prestigious collections such as the Robert Rifkind Collection, the Gordon Hampton Collection, the Eli Broad Collection and the Dallas Price Collection.
