= Soa Airport =

Soa Airport Bandar Udara Soa
- IATA: BJW; ICAO: WATB

Summary
- Airport type: Public
- Owner: Government of Indonesia
- Operator: Directorate General of Civil Aviation
- Serves: Bajawa
- Location: Soa, Ngada Regency, Flores, East Nusa Tenggara, Indonesia
- Time zone: WITA (UTC+08:00)
- Elevation AMSL: 4,326 ft (1,319 m)
- Coordinates: 8.708612°S 121.057901°E

Map
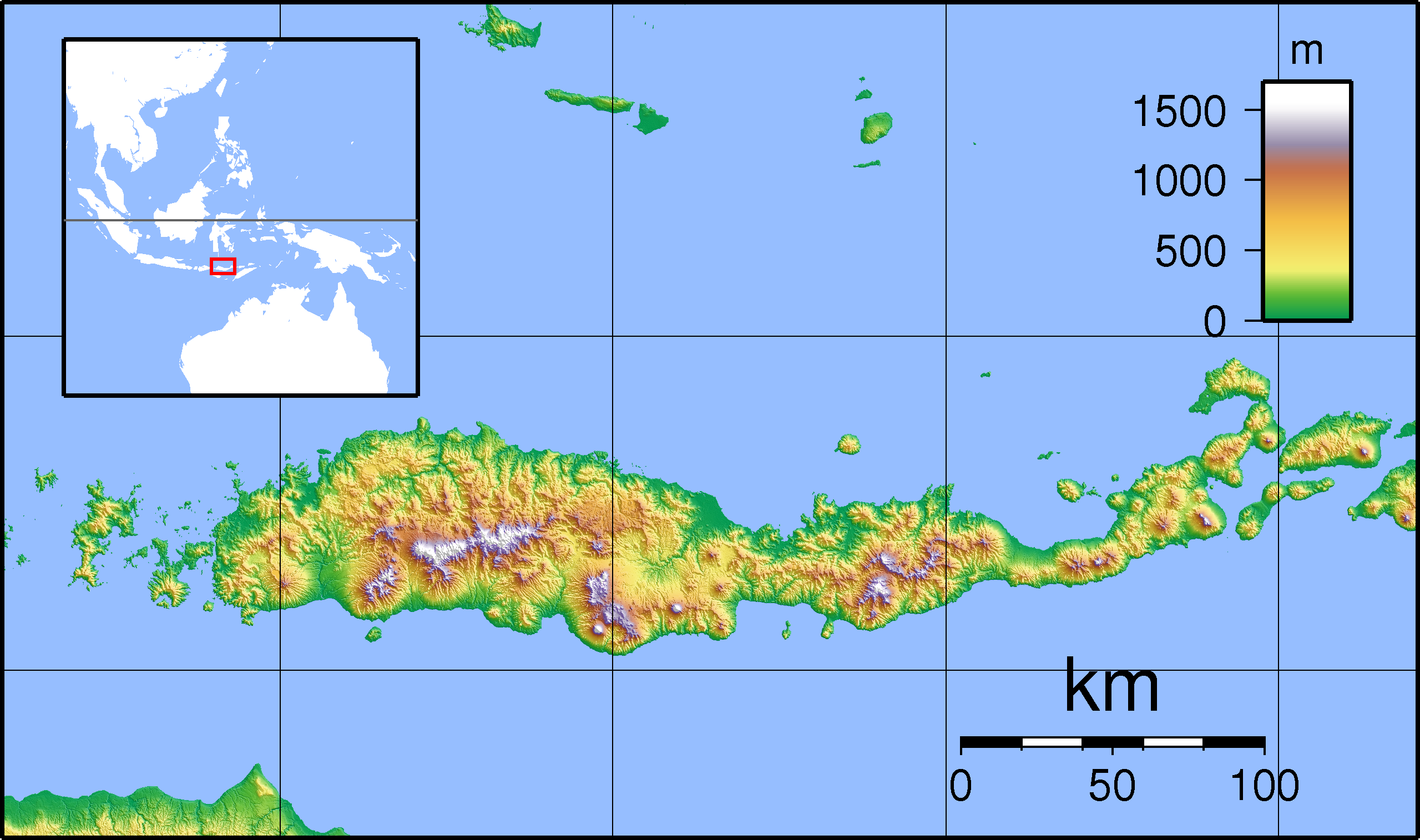
- Location in Flores Location in the Lesser Sunda Islands Location in Indonesia

Runways
Direction	Length		Surface
Direction	m	ft	Surface
11/29	1,600	5,249	Asphalt

Statistics (2024)
- Passengers: 45,111 (▼20.6%)
- Cargo (tonnes): 36.40 (▼29.4%)
- Aircraft movements: 1,155 (▼20.6%)
- Source: DGCA

Soa Airport (IATA: BJW, ICAO: WATB), also known as Turelelo-Soa Airport, is a domestic regional airport serving Bajawa, the administrative seat of Ngada Regency, in the central part of the island of Flores in the province of East Nusa Tenggara, Indonesia. The airport is named after Soa District, where it is located. Situated approximately 12 km (7.5 mi) from the center of Bajawa, it serves as one of the main gateways to Bajawa, Ngada Regency, and the surrounding areas. The airport currently handles limited regional services within East Nusa Tenggara, with Wings Air as the sole airline operating scheduled flights to Kupang, the provincial capital, and Labuan Bajo. In the past, the airport also served Bima and Ende through services operated by Merpati Nusantara Airlines. The airport has also historically been served by airlines including TransNusa and Citilink, although their services have since been discontinued.

== History ==
=== Background and construction ===
Check-in counters

Prior to the construction of the current airport, Bajawa was served by Pahdamaleda Airport in Turekisa, which was built in 1974 and located approximately 10 km (6.2 mi) from the center of Bajawa. The airport was built at an elevation of 1,240 metres (4,068 ft) above sea level and featured an 800-metre-long, 24-metre-wide runway with a grass surface. The airport served only pioneer flights, typically operated by De Havilland Canada DHC-6 Twin Otter aircraft on the Kupang–Bajawa–Kupang route, operated by Merpati Nusantara Airlines. The land used for Padamaleda Airport remained under the ownership of the Ngada Regency Government under a right of use arrangement. However, the airport’s challenging topography and high elevation, combined with frequent fog and heavy rainfall, made approaches difficult and potentially hazardous. Aircraft frequently experienced difficulties landing, including at least one failed landing attempt, making continued operation of the airport increasingly unfeasible.

As a result of these conditions, in 1990, the government decided to build a new airport to replace Pahdamaleda Airport in Piga Satu Village, Soa District, on a 47.42-hectare site owned by the Ministry of Transportation. This new facility was later named Soa Airport. At the time of its construction, Soa Airport had a runway measuring 800 meters in length and 24 meters in width, with an asphalt (hotmix) surface. With the opening of the new airport, all operations were transferred from Pahdamaleda Airport, which was subsequently abandoned. Similar to its predecessor, the airport was initially served by Twin Otter aircraft operating on the Kupang–Bajawa–Kupang route. It was subsequently upgraded to accommodate larger aircraft, including the Fokker F27. At the time, Merpati also introduced scheduled services from Bajawa to Ende and Bima on Sumbawa, with onward connections operated using the CASA C-212 Aviocar.

By the late 2000s and early 2010s, the airport remained a pioneer airport, with Merpati operating the only scheduled service to Kupang using the Xi'an MA-60. At the time, the runway was only 1,400 meters long, limiting the airport to aircraft such as the ATR 42.

=== Contemporary history ===
Boarding gate

On 21 December 2013, a high-profile incident occurred at the airport when then-Regent of Ngada, Marianus Sae, ordered the airport authorities to bar Merpati aircraft from landing after he was denied a seat on a fully booked Merpati flight to Kupang. Following the directive, the Ngada Regency Municipal Police used their vehicles to block the runway, preventing aircraft from landing. The blockade lasted for several hours. Two Merpati planes, one of them carrying 54 passengers, were forced to return to El Tari Airport in Kupang after the airport was closed from 6:15 a.m. to 9 a.m. Several other flights were also reportedly redirected.

In 2014, the runway was extended to 1,600 metres, allowing the airport to accommodate larger aircraft such as the ATR 72 and Fokker 50. Shortly thereafter, Wings Air launched the Kupang–Bajawa–Labuan Bajo route using ATR 72 aircraft. On 25 May 2016, TransNusa launched the Kupang–Bajawa route using Fokker 50 aircraft, with onward connections to other cities in Indonesia operated by Sriwijaya Air and NAM Air. The route was terminated in 2020 due to the COVID-19 pandemic, which led to severe restrictions on air travel. Wings Air also suspended the service during the pandemic but resumed operations in May 2022 following the easing of travel restrictions. Citilink launched the Kupang–Bajawa route in December 2020 using ATR 72-600 aircraft. The service was suspended after a short period, resumed in October 2022, and was subsequently discontinued again indefinitely.

In the early 2020s, proposals emerged to rename the airport as Yan Yos Botha Soa Airport, after former Ngada Regent Jan Josef Botha, who was recognized for his contributions to the people of Ngada during his tenure. In 2026, the proposal was revived when the Ngada Regency government formally submitted a letter to the Ministry of Transportation requesting that the airport be renamed.

The airport sustained significant damage following a major earthquake that struck Flores on 15 August 2026. Among the airports on the island, Soa Airport was reportedly one of the worst affected. The runway, along with several buildings and supporting facilities, sustained moderate damage, including new cracks in several areas. The earthquake resulted in the temporary suspension of all flights to and from the airport. Following the earthquake, the Ministry of Transportation identified several facilities at Soa Airport as priorities for repair. These include building structures, the passenger terminal, and supporting facilities for flight operations.

== Facilities and development ==
The passenger terminal has a floor area of 1,180 m² (12,701 sq ft) and can accommodate up to 39,650 passengers annually, with the boarding gate capable of handling up to 80 passengers during peak hours. The terminal provides a range of basic facilities for departing and arriving passengers, including check-in counters, departure gates, baggage carousels in the arrivals hall, a prayer room, smoking area, a Bank Rakyat Indonesia (BRI) ATM, lactation room, toilets, and a canteen. A separate VIP terminal is also located a few meters from the main passenger terminal. Other landside facilities include a 378 m² (4,069 sq ft) administration building, a 300 m² (3,229 sq ft) power house, a 220 m² (2,368 sq ft) workshop building, and a 350 m² (3,767 sq ft) Aircraft Rescue and Fire Fighting (PKP-PK) building. The airport also has a 2,065 m² (22,228 sq ft) parking area serving passengers, visitors, and airport personnel.

On the airside, the airport has a single asphalt hot-mix runway measuring 1,600 m × 30 m (5,249 ft × 98 ft), capable of accommodating aircraft such as the ATR 72 and Fokker 50. The runway was extended from 1,400 m (4,593 ft) to its current length in 2014. The runway is equipped with two turnpads, one at each end, each measuring 50 m × 15 m (164 ft × 49 ft), as well as Runway End Safety Areas (RESA) measuring 90 m × 140 m (295 ft × 459 ft) at both ends of the runway. The runway is a non-instrument runway and lacks published straight-in instrument approach procedures and electronic navigation aids such as an Instrument Landing System (ILS). As a result, aircraft operating at the airport must rely on visual approaches and are restricted to daytime operations. In addition to the runway, the airport is equipped with a single taxiway measuring 68 m × 18 m (223 ft × 59 ft) and a single aircraft apron measuring 190 m × 40 m (623 ft × 131 ft).

== Airlines and destinations ==
Airlines	Destinations
Wings Air	Kupang, Labuan Bajo

== Statistics ==
Apron view of Soa Airport

Annual passenger numbers and aircraft statistics
Year	Passengers handled	Passenger % change	Cargo (tonnes)	Cargo % change	Aircraft movements	Aircraft % change
2006	2,097	Steady	4.58	Steady	118	Steady
2007	3,582	▲70.8	6.84	▲49.3	184	▲55.9
2008	13,458	▲275.7	10.36	▲51.5	508	▲176.1
2009	13,845	▲2.9	69.78	▲573.6	370	▼27.2
2010	18,518	▲33.8	12.81	▼81.6	528	▲42.7
2011	31,145	▲68.2	22.43	▲75.1	890	▲68.6
2012	42,667	▲37.0	0.18	▼99.2	758	▼14.8
2013	32,649	▼23.5	66.00	▲36566.7	834	▲10.0
2014	26,296	▼19.5	26.67	▼59.6	670	▼19.7
2015	46,598	▲77.2	36.44	▲36.6	1,824	▲172.2
2016	76,184	▲63.5	25.65	▼29.6	2,110	▲15.7
2017	69,774	▼8.4	52.24	▲103.7	2,146	▲1.7
2018	95,148	▲36.4	57.16	▲9.4	2,294	▲6.9
2019	109,692	▲15.3	75.78	▲32.6	2,562	▲11.7
2020	69,653	▼36.5	39.23	▼48.2	1,768	▼31.0
2021	58,532	▼16.0	40.20	▲2.5	1,684	▼4.8
2022	38,845	▼33.6	76.91	▲91.3	948	▼43.7
2023	56,795	▲46.2	51.57	▼32.9	1,455	▲53.5
2024	45,111	▼20.6	36.40	▼29.4	1,155	▼20.6
^{Source: DGCA, BPS}
