= Ngada Regency =

Regency in East Nusa Tenggara, Indonesia

Ngada Regency Kabupaten Ngada
- Regency
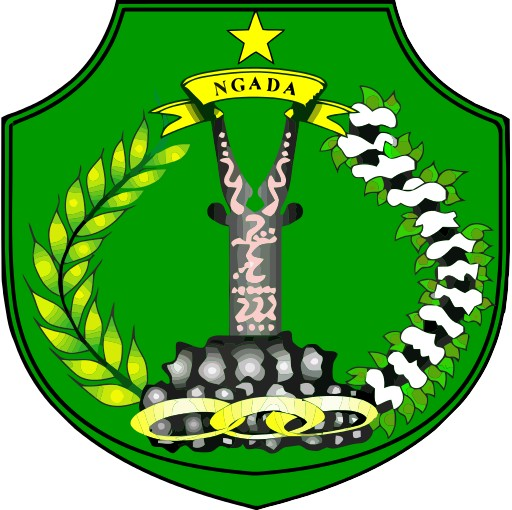
- Coat of arms

- Location within East Nusa Tenggara

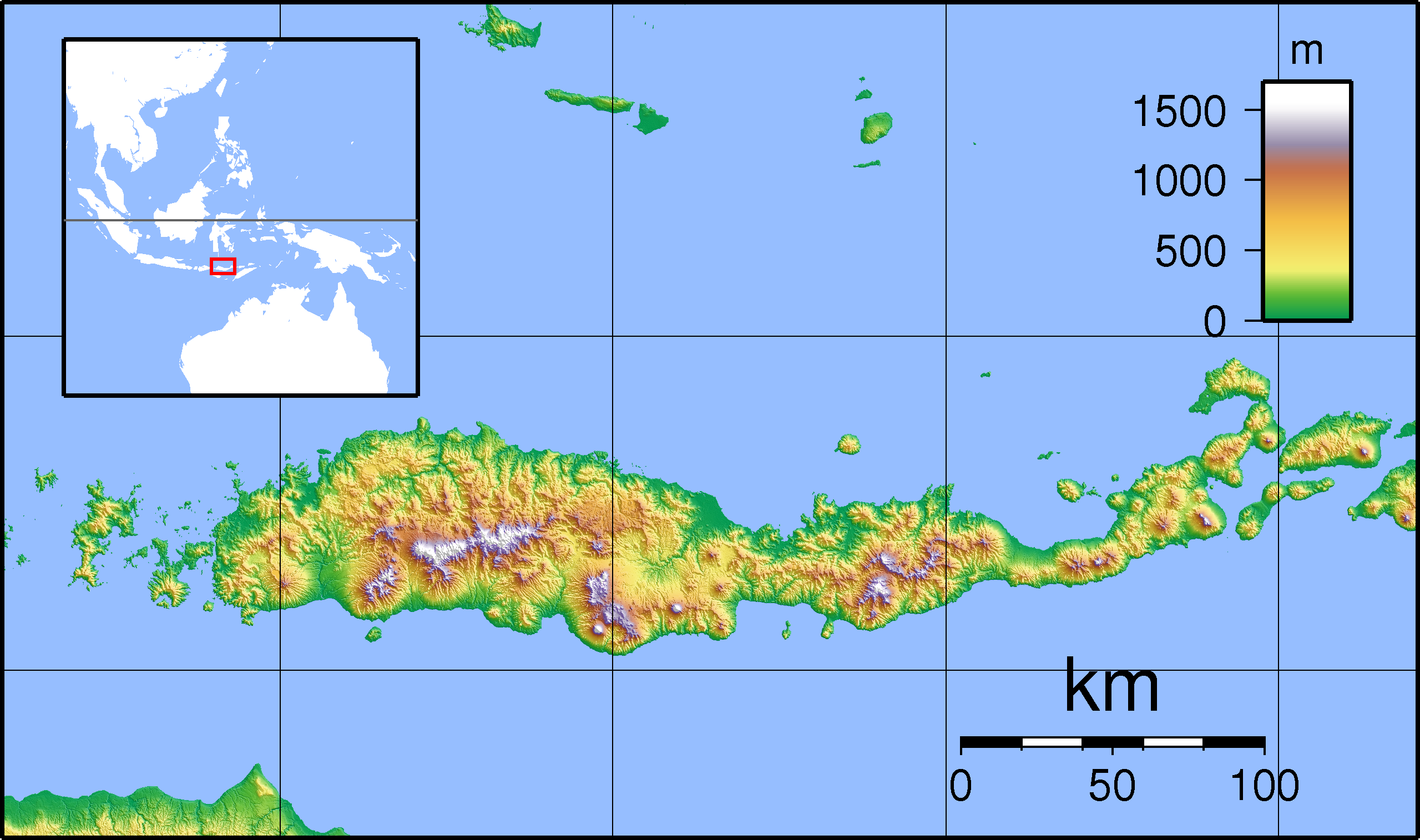
- Location in Flores, Lesser Sunda Islands and Indonesia Ngada Regency (Lesser Sunda Islands) Ngada Regency (Indonesia)
- Coordinates: 8.6667°S 121.0000°E
- Country: Indonesia
- Region: Lesser Sunda Islands
- Province: East Nusa Tenggara
- Capital: Bajawa

Government
  - Regent: Raymundus Bena
  - Vice Regent: Bernadinus Dhey Ngebu

Area
  - Total: 1,736.83 km^{2} (670.59 sq mi)

Population (mid 2025 estimate)
  - Total: 176,462
  - Density: 101.600/km^{2} (263.143/sq mi)
- Time zone: UTC+8 (ICST)
- Area code: (+62) 384
- Religion: Catholicism (90,75%); Islam (6,87%); Protestantism (2,23%); Hinduism (0,15%)
- Website: ngadakab.go.id

Ngada Regency is one of the regencies on the island of Flores, East Nusa Tenggara Province, Indonesia. It is bordered by East Manggarai Regency to the west and Nagekeo Regency to the east, with the Flores Sea to the north and the Sawu Sea to the south. The Regency, which covers an area of 1,736.83 km^{2}, had a population of 142,254 at the 2010 census, which increased to 165,254 at the 2020 census; the official estimate as of mid-2025 was 176,462 (comprising 87,071 males and 89,391 females). The town of Bajawa is the capital of Ngada Regency.

== History ==
The Ngada Regency is one of the older regencies (kabupaten) in East Nusa Tenggara, having been formed in 1958. The regency was split into two on 2 January 2007, with the eastern part being formed into a new Nagekeo Regency. With the separate of Nagekeo, the residual Ngada now only has two main ethnic groups, the Bajawa in the south and the Riung in the north.

== Administrative districts ==
The Ngada Regency as at 2010 was divided into nine districts (kecamatan), but since 2010 three additional districts have been created by splitting of existing districts - Inerie, Golewa Selatan (South Golewa) and Golewa Barat (West Golewa). The districts are tabulated below with their areas and their populations at the 2010 census and the 2020 census, together with the official estimates as of mid-2025. The table also includes the locations of the administrative centres, the number of administrative villages in each district (totalling 135 rural desa and 16 urban kelurahan), and its postal codes.

Kode Wilayah	Name of District (kecamatan)	Area in km^{2}	Pop'n census 2010	Pop'n census 2020	Pop'n estimate mid 2025	Admin centre	No. of villages	Post codes
53.09.01	Aimere	153.24	14,842	10,518	11,366	Aimere	10 ^{(a)}	86452
53.09.12	Jerebuu	107.82	7,252	7,506	8,042	Jerebuu	12	86451
53.09.20	Inerie	154.30	^{(b)}	8,281	9,001	Waebela	10	86450
53.09.06	Bajawa	102.76	36,082	39,442	40,870	Surisina	22 ^{(c)}	86411: 86419
53.09.02	Golewa	68.54	36,011	18,914	19,571	Mataloko	16 ^{(d)}	86461
53.09.18	Golewa Selatan (South Golewa)	80.57	^{(e)}	12,174	13,705	Waturoka	12	86466
53.09.19	Golewa Barat (West Golewa)	65.72	^{(e)}	11,260	12,276	Rakalaba	10 ^{(f)}	86460
53.09.15	Bajawa Utara (North Bajawa)	48.50	8,489	10,410	11,404	Watukapu	11	86413
53.09.07	Soa	351.90	12,745	14,327	15,048	Waepana	14	86422
	South half	1,133.35	115,421	132,832	141,283		117	
53.09.09	Riung ^{(g)}	286.72	13,875	16,610	17,985	Riung	16 ^{(h)}	86419
53.09.14	Riung Barat (West Riung)	87.35	7,759	9,222	9,951	Marunggela	10	86421
59.09.16	Wolomeze	229.42	5,338	6,590	7,243	Wangawelu	8	86423
	North half	603.49	26,972	32,422	35,179		34	
	Totals	1,736.83	142,254	165,254	176,462		151	

Notes: (a) including two kelurahan - Aimere (the main seaport on the south coast) and Foa.
(b) the 2010 population of the new Inerie District is included with the figures for Aimere and Jerebuu Districts. (c) including nine kelurahan - Bajawa, Faobata, Jawameze, Kisanata, Lebijaga, Ngedukelu, Susu, Tanalodu and Trikora.
(d) including two kelurahan - Mataloko and Todabelu. (e) the 2010 populations of the new Golewa Selatan and Golewa Barat Districts are included with the figure for Golewa District. (f) including the kelurahan of Mangulewa.
(g) the Riung District includes 26 small offshore islands, of which the largest is Pulau Ontoloe in the northwest corner of the regency. (h) including two kelurahan - Benteng Tengah and Nangamese.

== Language ==
The principal language in Ngada is Ngadha, but there are several indigenous languages in Ngada based on their ethnicity. People from Aimere, Bajawa, Golewa, Inerie and Jerebu'u might speak the same language with minor differences, while people from Soa speak a slightly different language, and people from Riung speak a totally different language. Unable to communicate each other in their indigenous languages, they use Indonesian.

== Geology, geothermy ==
Mataloko (administrative center of Golewa district) has a geothermal area of 996.2 ha and is one of the most active geothermal fields in the Bajawa area, which stands along the southeast margin of the Bajawa Depression. (Note: The Bajawa Depression is a zone of subsidence. For more details on it and on the geology of this area, see Koseki & Nakashima 2006, p. 106.) Its heat source is deemed to be residual magma under the young volcanic cone and it generates more than 20 hot springs with temperatures up to 95 °C and flows up to 500 l/s. The northern springs are likely to be associated with Inielika volcano (Note: Inielika volcano, about 8 km north of Bajawa, is also called Inelika.) while the large group of features SW of Bajawa town are associated with Ineri cone and the many small recent eruptive centres to the east. The hot spring water is of acid sulfate (SO_{4}) type — except for that at Nage where the waters are acid sulphate – chloride type. It results from shallower ground water being heated by gases containing hydrogen sulfide (H_{2}S) and carbon dioxide (CO_{2}) and the ground water recharged from the surrounding area. Recharged meteoric water flows down underground, changes to geothermal brine, flows back up toward the southeast and results in a geothermal reservoir.
As of 2022, Mataloko geothermal field has a total of 6 wells: 2 exploration wells (MT-1 and MT-2), which were drilled by the Japan-Indonesia Cooperation Research Program; (Note: MT-1 and MT-2 wells were dug during a five-year Indonesian-Japanese bilateral research cooperation program: the "Research Cooperation Project on the Exploration of Smallscale Geothermal Resources in the Eastern Part of Indonesia (ESSEI Project)", that started in April 1997 and ended in March 2002. MT-1 was dug at a depth of 207.26 m and MT-2 at a depth of 180.02 m. MT-3 and MT-4 were dug later in 2003 or 2004 by the Directorate General of Geology and Mineral Resources (DGGMR).) 2 delineation wells (MT-3 and MT-4); 1 development well (MT-5); and 1 injection well (MT-6). Mataloko geothermal power plant has been in operation since 1998.

The locals do not accept that geothermal project for several reasons. Damages to 1,579 houses in 11 villages are mentioned (Note: The damaged houses were in the villages of Ulubelu, Ratogesa, Waeia, Malanuza, Dada Wea, Rada Bata, Were, Ekoroka, Todabelu, Radamasa and Mataloko villages.) in 2022. The roofs, most of them made of iron sheets, are corroded by the sulphur gas. The sulphur also affects agricultural crops such as cloves, coffee and cacao. And there are complaints about the strong sulphur smell from the power plant.

== Tourism ==
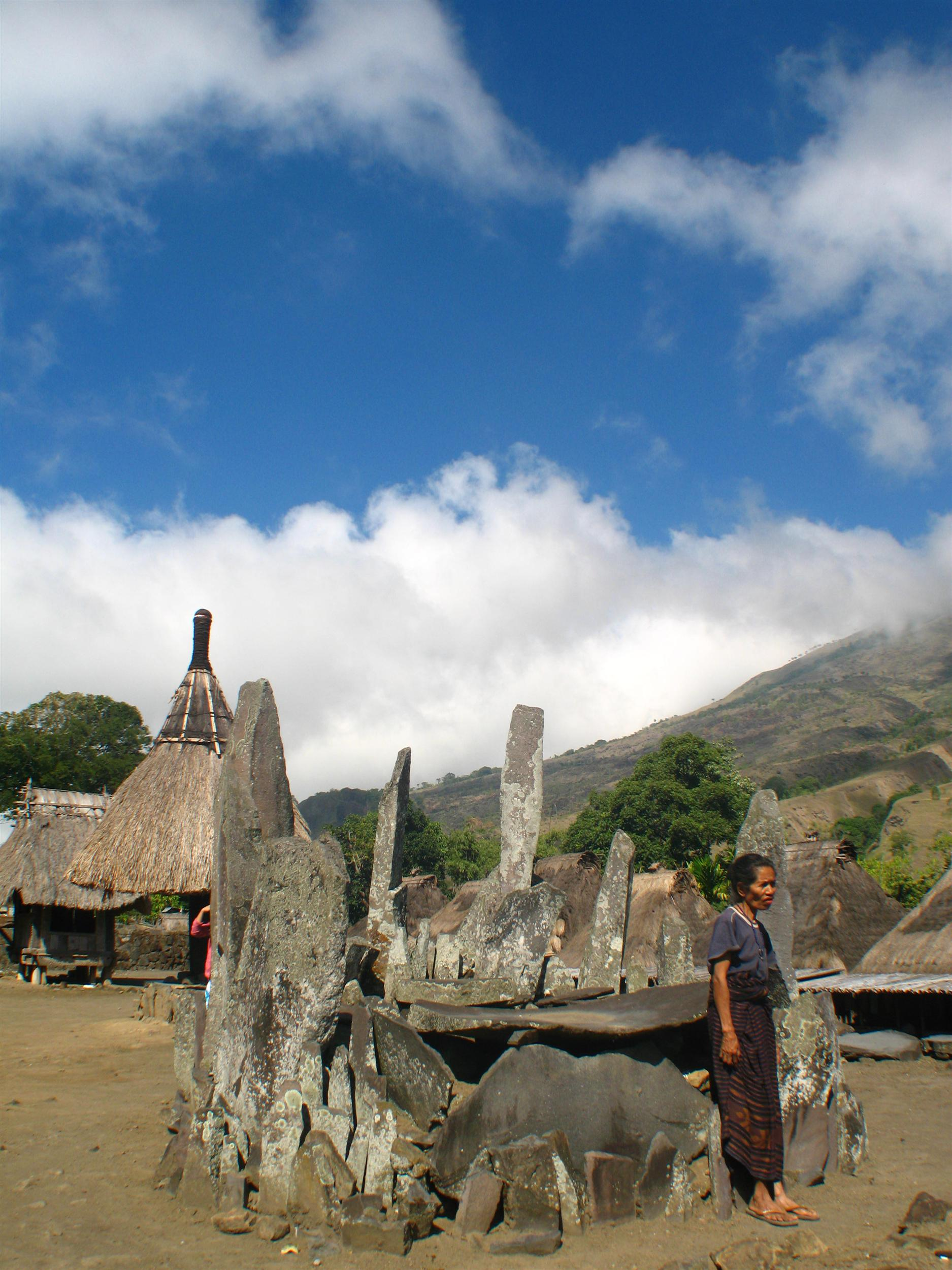
One of the ancient megalithic structures in the village of Bena.

Ngada Regency is one of the poorest regions in Indonesia but its popularity is increasing among international tourists, which somewhat brings a boost to the local economy.

The two most visited areas in the Ngada region are Bena and Wogo, both traditional villages with megalithic complexes. In Ngadha culture, the traditional houses have an important role as organizational units, as villagers must each belong to a house, thereby a clan. Clan totems can be ornately crafted symbols of this social organization.

Two hot springs are relatively easily accessible: Malanage and Mangeruda.
Malanage hot spring (Tiworiwu, Jerebuu district), to the east of the Inerie volcano, is 20 km south of Bajawa and near the traditional villages of Nio or Ngio (2 km east), Niki Sie (4 km south-east), Nua Olo (7 km south-east), Bowaru (2 km south), Pali Ana Loka (12 km south) Tololela (6 km south-west) and Bena (6 km north-west). Malanage hot spring reaches a temperature between 42 °C and 45 °C. The collecting basin receives a hot current from the Inerie volcano and a cold current from the Wae Roa waterfall; by changing one's position in the basin, one experiences the whole range of temperatures from almost too hot to very cold. The local community from the nearby village of Dariwali takes care of that spring.
Mangeruda hot spring (Indonesian Air Panas Soa, also known as Soa hot spring) is in Soa district, 22 km north-east of Bajawa. It is a bit hotter than the Malanage hot spring, and less isolated.

In the north, Riung is the portal to the beaches and underwater world of the 17-island marine park. The activities include snorkeling, diving, sun bathing, and observing flying foxes.

== Culture ==
The "Ngada traditional house and megalithic complex" was added to the UNESCO World Heritage Tentative List on October 19, 1995, in the Cultural category, but was pulled out from the list in 2015.

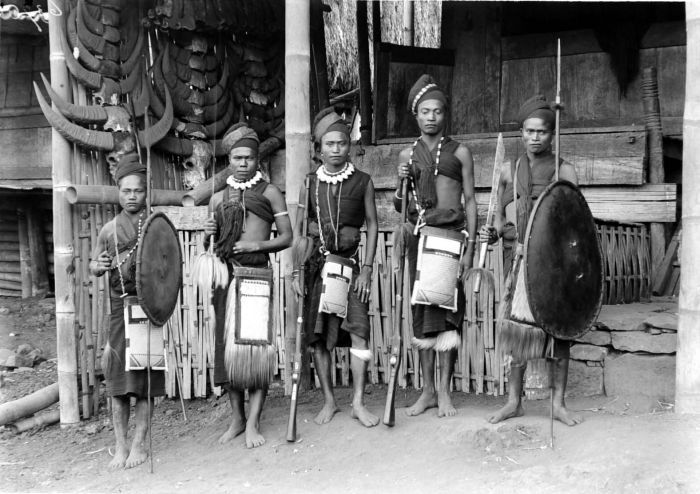
Ngada warriors.

== Soa Valley ==
In 1968 stegodon fossil and stone artefacts were found in the Soa Valley north of Bajawa. In 1991 excavations were carried out but no significant discoveries were found. In excavations in 1994 researchers found 12 sites of artefacts and the fossils. The age of the Soa Valley is put at around 650,000 to 1.02 million years during which time there were at least two devastating volcanic events. So far, researchers have not found human fossils but it is believed that human fossils may yet be found. Stone artefacts suggesting hominin activity have been found in caves such as Mata Menge in the area. If human fossils are indeed found, this may contribute to knowledge about migration into eastern Indonesia. Research at nearby Liang Bua cave to the west near Ruteng has also contributed to expanding knowledge about early human activity in the area.
