= Pahdamaleda Airport =

Pahdamaleda Airport Bandar Udara Pahdamaleda
- IATA: BJW; ICAO: WATB

Summary
- Location: Bajawa, Flores, Indonesia
- Elevation AMSL: 4,327 ft / 1,319 m
- Coordinates: 8°48′47″S 120°59′54″E

Map
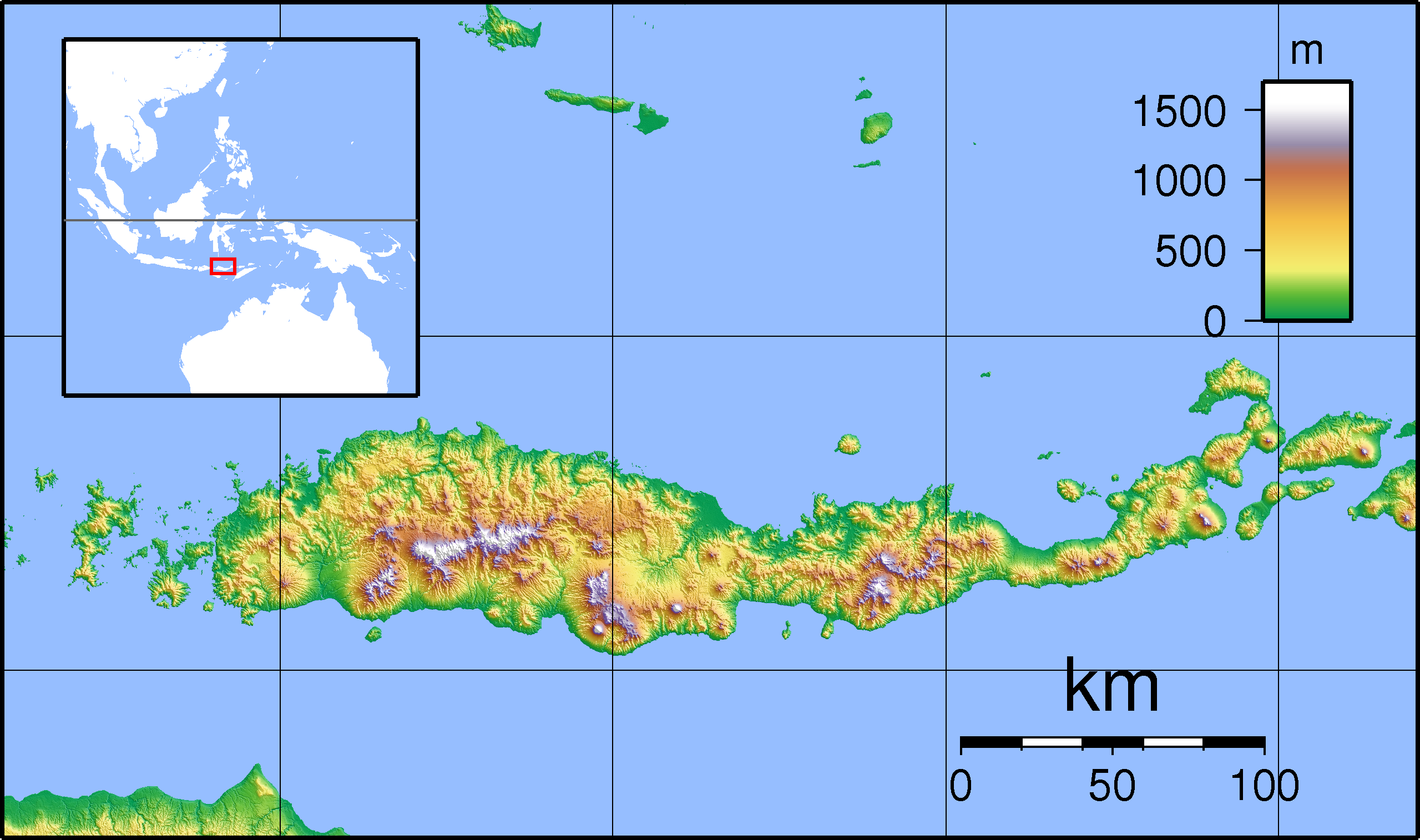
- Location in Flores Location in the Lesser Sunda Islands Location in Indonesia

Runways
Direction	Length		Surface
Direction	ft	m	Surface
10 / 28	2,953	900	Asphalt

Pahdamaleda Airport is an airport in Bajawa, Flores, Indonesia.
