= San Diego School of Creative and Performing Arts =

Coordinates: 32°40′49″N 117°2′54″W

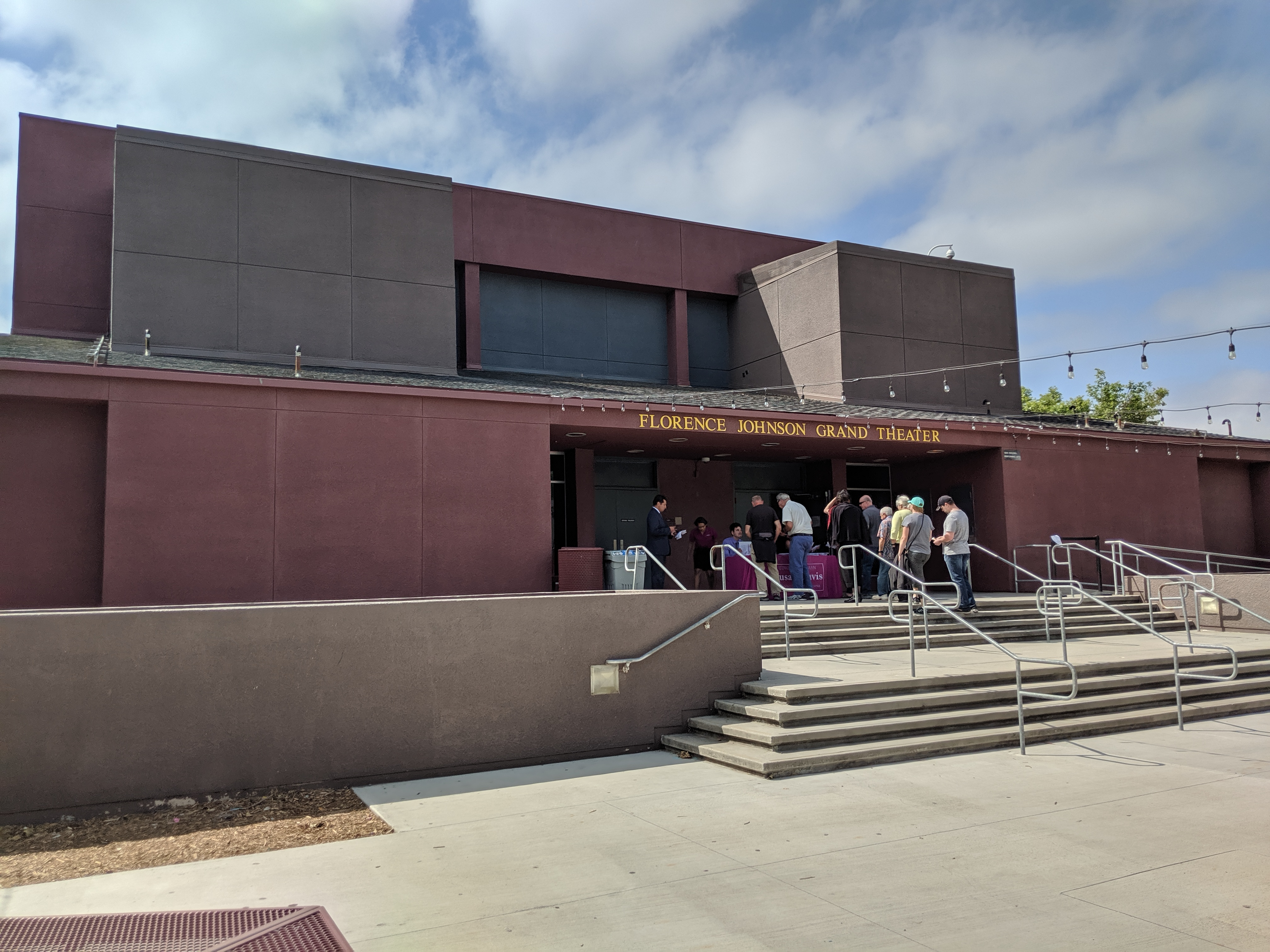

Location
- 2425 Dusk Drive; San Diego, California 92139; United States

Information
- Type: Public magnet school Specialist arts school
- Established: 1978
- School district: San Diego Unified School District
- Principal: Timothy E. Farson
- Faculty: 56.43 (FTE)
- Grades: 6–12
- Enrollment: 1,429 (2018-19)
- Student to teacher ratio: 25.32
- Campus type: Suburban
- Website: www.sdscpa.org

The San Diego School of Creative and Performing Arts (SDSCPA) is an audition-only public arts magnet school in southeastern San Diego, California. It is a non-tuition school in San Diego Unified School District. It provides pre-professional training in the arts alongside a college preparatory curriculum. All students audition and complete a required series of specialized arts training in theater, music, dance, visual arts, or creative writing.

== Enrollment ==
=== Middle school ===
Middle school applicants must complete the San Diego Unified School District Open Enrollment application and then contact artistic director, Richard Trujillo, to set up an audition. Auditions usually take place in the Fall. Acceptance is via audition only.

=== High school ===
All students must first complete the San Diego Unified School District Open Enrollment Application. Prospective high school students must audition for a specific program in one of five majors: Creative Writing, Dance, Dramatic Arts, Music, and Visual and Media Arts. Students may audition and be accepted into several programs, but must choose which one they will pursue while at SDSCPA. Each program has its own audition panel.

== Productions ==
=== Mainstages ===
Each spring the San Diego School of Creative and Performing Arts releases their upcoming performance season. Shows are typically staged in one of two main locations – the Florence Johnson Grand Theater or the Ole Kittleson Little Theater.

== Arts ==
=== Music ===
Students can choose from four main forms of music: Band, Jazz, Orchestra, and Voice. The advanced musical groups go on annual tours to compete against other schools from around the nation. These tours can be to places as close as Anaheim and Las Vegas, or as far as Boston and Hawaii. The most notable tour was in 2016 to New York City, featuring the school's Jazz Band at the Jazz at Lincoln Center Competition.

=== Dance ===
Several dance classes are available. These classes, ranging from beginning to advanced levels, are not limited to only one or two types of dance. Classes include Theater Dance, Ballet, Modern, and jazz tap.

A professional strand dance class is two periods long. These are meant for more serious dancers who want to get the best of their training.

=== Visual and Cinematic Arts ===
Students in the Visual and Cinematic Arts programs take courses in photography, drawing and painting, video production, and yearbook.

In 2015, the SDSCPA opened a new multimillion dollar film studio, launching the Cinematic Arts program.

=== Theatre ===
Students majoring in Theatre complete courses in Acting, Musical Theatre, or Technical Theatre.

=== Creative Writing ===
Students majoring in Creative Writing take courses in Creative Writing and Journalism. Students may also elect to take courses in Broadcast Journalism.

== Notable students ==
- Andra Day, Golden Globe Winner and singer
- Hans Fjellestad, filmmaker and musician
- Jane Granby, artist
- Christian Hoff, 2006 Tony Award winner
- Ananda Lewis, television personality
- James Maslow, actor
- Sara Ramirez, Tony Award-winning actress
- Giovonnie Samuels, actress
- Brian Justin Crum, singer
- Salem Mitchell, model
- Lou Romano, animator and voice actor
- Brad Bradley, Broadway Actor
- Faithe Herman, actress

== See also ==
- Primary and secondary schools in San Diego, California
