= Psoquillidae =

- Psoquilla marginepunctata adults, macropterous (top) and brachypterous (bottom)

Scientific classification
- Kingdom: Animalia
- Phylum: Arthropoda
- Clade: Pancrustacea
- Class: Insecta
- Order: Psocodea
- Suborder: Trogiomorpha
- Infraorder: Atropetae
- Family: Psoquillidae; Lienhard & Smithers, 2002

Family of booklice

Psoquillidae is a family of bird nest barklice in the order Psocodea (formerly Psocoptera). There are about 8 genera and more than 30 described species in Psoquillidae.

== Genera ==
These eight genera belong to the family Psoquillidae:

- Balliella Badonnel, 1949
- Eosilla Ribaga, 1908
- Psoquilla Hagen, 1865
- Rhyopsocidus Smithers & Mockford, 2004
- Rhyopsocoides Garcia Aldrete, 2006
- Rhyopsoculus Garcia Aldrete, 1984
- Rhyopsocus Hagen, 1876
- † Eorhyopsocus Nel, Prokop, De Ploeg & Millet, 2005 Oise amber, France, Ypresian
