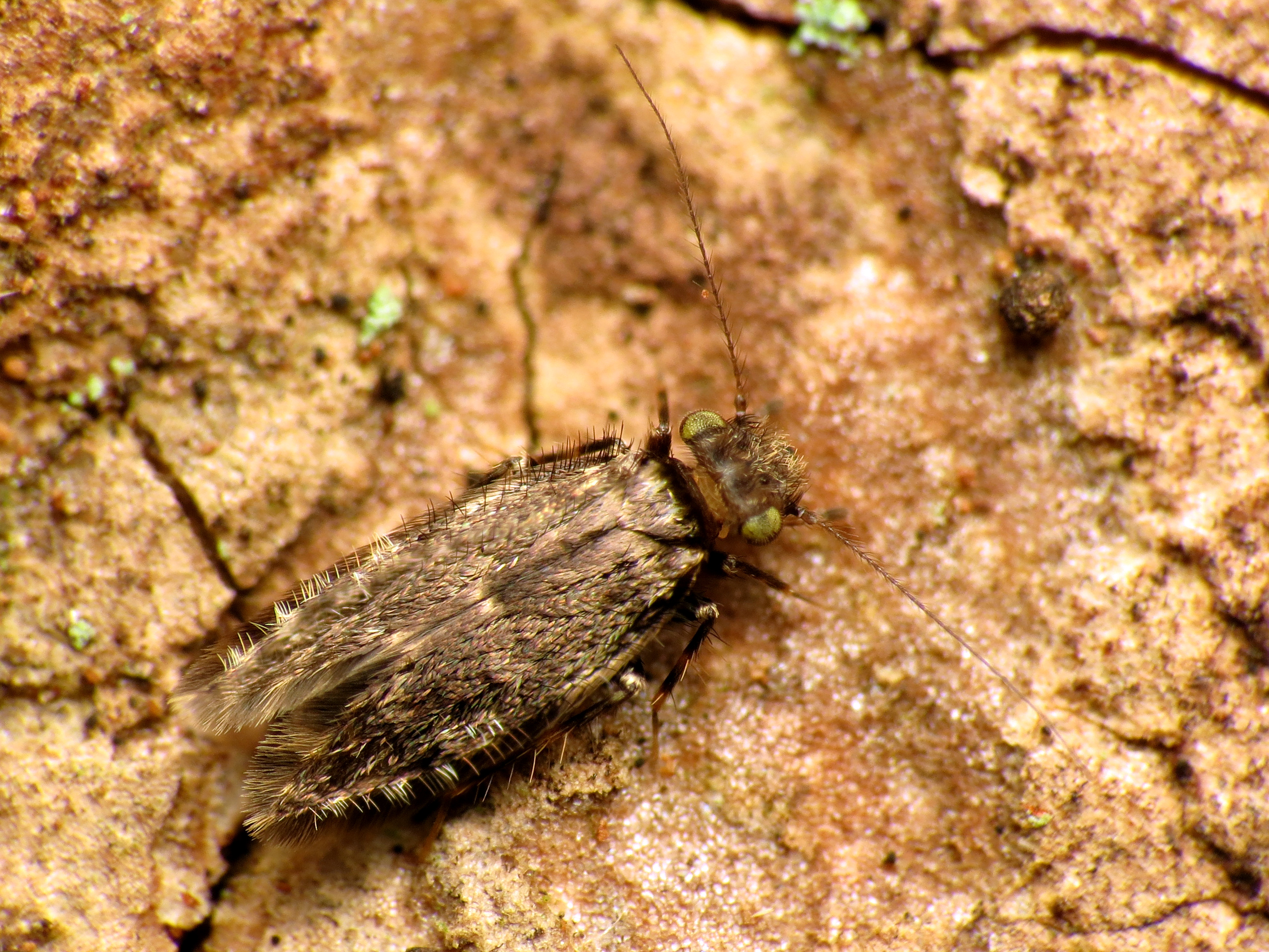
- Echmepteryx hageni

Scientific classification
- Kingdom: Animalia
- Phylum: Arthropoda
- Clade: Pancrustacea
- Class: Insecta
- Order: Psocodea
- Suborder: Trogiomorpha
- Infraorder: Atropetae
- Family: Lepidopsocidae; Enderlein, 1903

= Lepidopsocidae =

Family of booklice

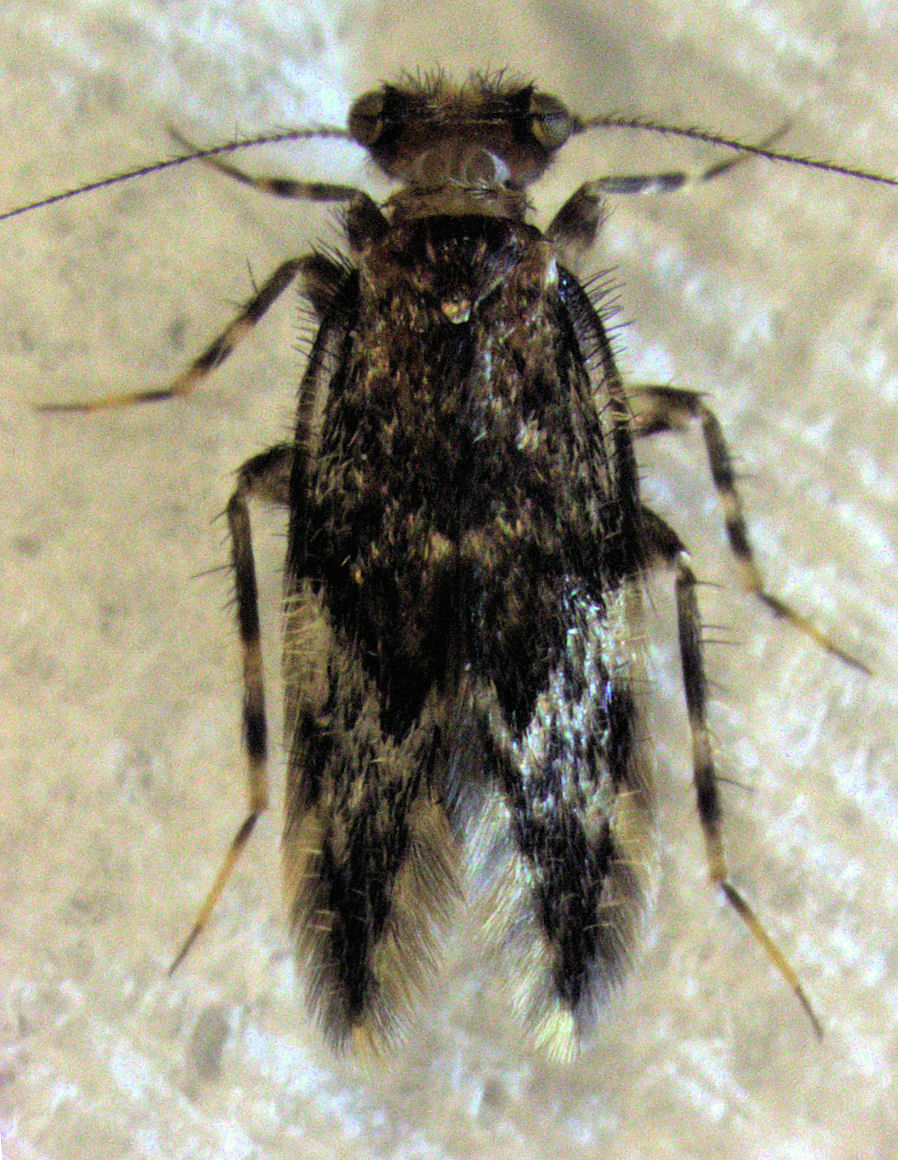
Echmepteryx hamiltoni

Lepidopsocidae are an insect family of bark lice belonging to the suborder Trogiomorpha. Their common name is scaly-winged barklice. There are more than 220 species described worldwide. Phylogenetic DNA analysis of relationships between families in Trogiomorpha propose that Lepidopsocidae is monophyletic, meaning that the taxa within all share a common ancestor. This is supported morphologically by the presence of scales and setae covering the body and forewings of Lepodopsocids. Sister families of Lepidoposcidae include Trogiidae and Psoquillidae.

Lepidopsocidae was described by Gunther Enderlein in The Scaly Winged Copeognatha (Monograph of the Amphientomidae, Lepidopsocidae, and Lepidillidae in relation to their Morphology and Taxonomy), published in 1906. Subfamilies of Lepidopsocidae include:

- Echinopsocinae Enderlein, 1906
- Lepidopsocinae Enderlein, 1903
- Lepolepidinae
- Parasoinae Mockford, 2005
- Perientominae Enderlein, 1903
- Thylacellinae Roesler, 1944

== Genera ==
These 21 genera belong to the family Lepidopsocidae:

- Cyptophania Banks, 1931
- Echinopsocus Enderlein, 1903
- Echmepteryx Aaron, 1886
- Illepidopsocus Li, 1994
- Lepidopsocus Enderlein, 1903
- Lepolepis Enderlein, 1906
- Neolepidopsocus Li, 1992
- Neolepolepis Mockford, 1993
- Nepticulomima Enderlein, 1906
- Notolepium Enderlein, 1910
- Papuapsocus Mockford, 2005
- Parasoa Thornton, 1962
- Perientomum Hagen, 1865
- Proentomum Badonnel, 1949
- Pseudothylacus Li, 2002
- Pteroxanium Enderlein, 1922
- Scolopama Enderlein, 1906
- Soa Enderlein, 1904
- Thylacella Enderlein, 1911
- † Lepium Enderlein, 1906
- † Thylax Hagen, 1866
