= Sarawak =

State in East Malaysia

- State
- State of Sarawak; Negeri Sarawak (Malay)
- Flag Coat of arms
- Nickname(s): Bumi Kenyalang (English: "Land of the Hornbills")
- Motto: Bersatu, Berusaha, Berbakti (English: "United, Striving, Serving")
- Anthem: Ibu Pertiwiku (English: "My Motherland")
- Sarawak in Malaysia
- Interactive map of Sarawak
- Country: Malaysia
- Sultanate of Sarawak: 1599
- Raj of Sarawak: 24 September 1841
- Japanese occupation: 16 December 1941
- Crown colony: 1 July 1946
- Gained self-governance: 22 July 1963
- Federated into Malaysia: 16 September 1963
- Capital and largest city: Kuching; 01°33′27″N 110°20′38″E
- Divisions: Betong, Bintulu, Kapit, Kuching, Limbang, Miri, Mukah, Samarahan, Sarikei, Serian, Sibu, Sri Aman
- Official languages: Malay; English
- Common languages: Iban; Chinese; Bidayuh; Melanau; Kelabit; other ethnic minority languages
- Ethnic groups: 71.8% Bumiputera (including Dayak); 28.6% Iban; 23.5% Malay; 8.2% Bidayuh; 5.1% Melanau; 6.4% Other natives; 22.6% Chinese; 0.2% Indian; 0.3% Other ethnicities; 5.1% Non-citizens
- Religion: 50.1% Christianity; 31.6% Protestantism; 18.5% Catholicism; 34.2% Sunni Islam; 12.8% Buddhism; 0.1% Hinduism; 0.5% other religion; 2.2% unknown
- Demonym(s): Sarawakian
- Government: Federated parliamentary government under a dominant-party system
  - Yang di-Pertua Negeri: Wan Junaidi Tuanku Jaafar
  - Premier: Abang Johari (GPS–PBB)
- Legislature: Legislative Assembly

Parliament
  - Dewan Rakyat seats: 31 of 222 (14.0%)
  - Dewan Negara seats: 2 of 70 (2.9%)

Area
  - Total: 124,450 km^{2} (48,050 sq mi)
- Highest elevation (Mount Murud): 2,424 m (7,953 ft)

Population
- ▲2,907,500
  - Density: 23/km^{2} (59.6/sq mi)
- GDP (PPP): 2025 estimate
  - Total: ▲$143,607 billion (4th)
  - Per capita: ▲$54,233
- GDP (nominal): 2025 estimate
  - Total: ▲$45,632 billion (RM 195,305 billion) (4th)
  - Per capita: ▲$17,233 (RM 54,233) (4th)
- HDI: ▲0.821 very high · 8th
- Currency: Malaysian ringgit (RM) (MYR)
- Time zone: UTC+08:00 (MST)
- Mains electricity: 230 V, 50 Hz
- Driving side: Left
- Calling code: 082 to 086
- ISO 3166 code: MY-13
- Website: Official website

Sarawak (/səˈrɑːwɒk/ sə-RAH-wok, Malay: [saˈrawaʔ]) is a state of Malaysia. It is the largest of the 13 states, with an area almost equal to that of Peninsular Malaysia. Sarawak is in East Malaysia, in northwest Borneo, and is bordered by the Malaysian state of Sabah to the northeast, Kalimantan (the Indonesian portion of Borneo) to the south, and Brunei to the north. The state capital, Kuching, is Sarawak's largest city, its economic centre, and the seat of the state government. Other cities and towns in Sarawak include Miri, Sibu, and Bintulu. As of the 2020 Malaysia census, Sarawak's population was 2.453 million. Sarawak has an equatorial climate, with tropical rainforests and abundant animal and plant species. It has several prominent cave systems at Gunung Mulu National Park. Rajang River is Malaysia's longest river; Bakun Dam, one of Southeast Asia's largest dams, is on one of its tributaries, the Balui River. Mount Murud is Sarawak's highest point. Sarawak is Malaysia's only state with a Christian majority.

The earliest known human settlement in Sarawak at the Niah Caves dates back 40,000 years. A series of Chinese ceramics dated from the 8th to 13th century AD was uncovered at the archaeological site of Santubong. Sarawak's coastal regions came under the influence of the Bruneian Empire in the 16th century. In 1839, James Brooke, a British explorer, arrived in Sarawak. He and his descendants governed the state from 1841 to 1946. During World War II, it was occupied by the Japanese for three years. After the war, the last White Rajah, Charles Vyner Brooke, ceded Sarawak to Britain, and in 1946 it became a British Crown Colony. The British granted Sarawak self-government on 22 July 1963 and it subsequently became one of Malaysia's founding members, but Indonesia opposed the federation, leading to a three-year confrontation. Malaysia's creation also prompted a communist insurgency that lasted until 1990.

The head of state is the governor, also known as the Yang di-Pertua Negeri, and the head of government is the premier. Sarawak is divided into administrative divisions and districts, governed by a system closely modelled on the Westminster parliamentary system, Malaysia's earliest state legislature system. Under the Malaysian constitution, Sarawak has greater autonomy than the states in Peninsular Malaysia.

Because of its natural resources, Sarawak specialises in the export of oil and gas, timber and palm oil, but also has strong manufacturing, energy and tourism sectors. It is ethnically, culturally, religiously and linguistically diverse; its ethnic groups include Iban, Chinese, Malay, Bidayuh, Melanau, Orang Ulu, Indian, Eurasian and Kedayan. English and Malay are the state languages; there is no official religion.

== Etymology ==
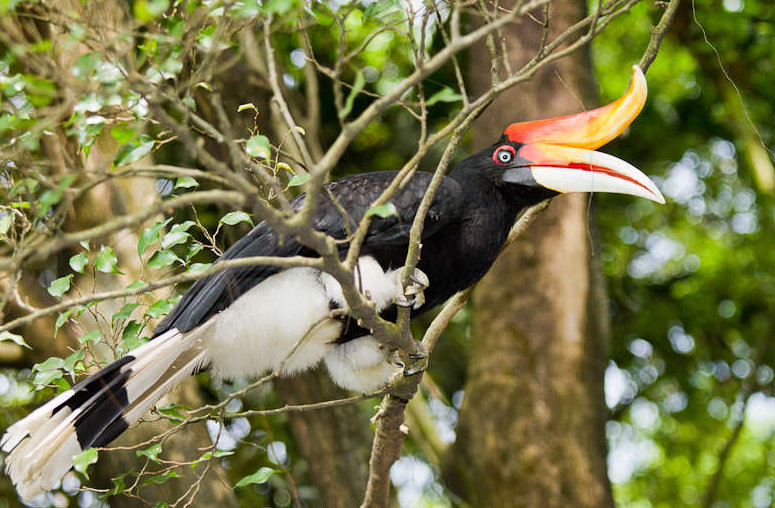
The rhinoceros hornbill is the state bird of Sarawak.

The generally accepted explanation of the state's name is that it derives from the Sarawak Malay word Serawak, which means antimony. A popular alternative explanation is that it is a contraction of the four Malay words Pangeran Muda Hashim (the Sultan of Brunei's uncle) purportedly uttered when he gave Sarawak to James Brooke, an English explorer, in 1841: "Saya serah pada awak" ("I surrender it to you"). But that is false: the territory was named Sarawak before Brooke arrived, and the word awak was not in Sarawak Malay's vocabulary before the formation of Malaysia. The area of today's Sarawak was known as Cerava by Portuguese cartographers in the 16th century.

Sarawak is nicknamed "Land of the Hornbills" (Bumi Kenyalang). These birds are important cultural symbols for the Dayak people, representing the spirit of God. It is believed that if a hornbill is seen flying over residences, it will bring the local community good luck. Sarawak has eight of the world's 54 species of hornbills, and the Rhinoceros hornbill is Sarawak's state bird.

== History ==
Foragers are known to have lived around the west mouth of the Niah Caves (located 110 km (68 mi) southwest of Miri) 40,000 years ago. A modern human skull found near the Niah Caves is the oldest example of human remains found in Malaysia and the oldest modern human skull from Southeast Asia. Chinese ceramics dating to the Tang and Song dynasties (8th to 13th century AD, respectively) found at Santubong (near Kuching) hint at its significance as a seaport.

One of the earliest Chinese records of an independent kingdom in Borneo is the 977 AD letter to the Chinese emperor from the ruler of Boni, which some scholars believe to refer to Borneo. The Bruneians regained their independence from Srivijaya due to the onset of a Javanese-Sumatran war. In 1225, the Chinese official Zhao Rukuo reported that Boni had 100 warships to protect its trade, and that there was great wealth in the kingdom. Marco Polo suggested in his memoirs that the Great Khan or the ruler of the Mongol Empire, attempted and failed many times in invading "Great Java" which was the European name for Bruneian controlled Borneo. In the 1300s the Chinese annals, Nanhai zhi, reported that Brunei invaded or administered Sarawak and Sabah as well as the Philippine kingdoms of Butuan, Sulu, Ma-i (Mindoro), Malilu 麻裏蘆 (present-day Manila), Shahuchong 沙胡重 (present-day Siocon), Yachen 啞陳 (Oton), and 文杜陵 Wenduling (present-day Mindanao), which would regain their independence at a later date.

The Melano kingdom existed from about 1300 to 1400 AD and was centred at the Mukah River. Rajah Tugau was a King in Sarawak who was mentioned in both Bruneian and Filipino (Madja-as) sources. His kingdom covered coastal Sarawak until Belait and consisted of groups of similar Melanau and Kajang language speakers who shared an almost identical culture and heritage. Nagarakertagama, written in 1365 during Hayam Wuruk, mentions Malano and Barune(ng) among the 14 tributaries of Majapahit. After the fall of Majapahit, Barune(ng) expanded its territory along the northern coast of Borneo. According to the manuscript of Brunei's rulers, following the fall of Majapahit, Barunai led by Awang Semaun being reinforced by the Iban, conquered Tutong under its chief Mawanga and the whole of the Melano kingdom until Igan under its chief Basiung despite reinforcement from Sambas. Barunai continued the conquest of the entire south and then north of Borneo, after which he conquered the whole of Sulu and the Philippines.

In the 14th century, the Javanese manuscript Nagarakretagama, written by Prapanca in 1365, mentioned Barune as the constituent state of Hindu Majapahit, which had to make an annual tribute of forty katis of camphor. In 1369, Sulu which was also formerly part of Majapahit, successfully rebelled and then attacked Boni, and had invaded the Northeast Coast of Borneo and afterwards had looted the capital of its treasure and gold including sacking two sacred pearls. A fleet from Majapahit succeeded in driving away the Sulus, but Boni was left weaker after the attack. A Chinese report from 1371 described Boni as poor and totally controlled by Majapahit.

The Bruneian Empire was established in the coastal regions of Sarawak by the mid-15th century, and the Kuching area was known to Portuguese cartographers during the 16th century as Cerava, one of the five great seaports of Borneo. The Sultanate of Sarawak was established during this time and lasted for almost half a century before being reunited with Brunei in 1641. By the early 19th century, the Bruneian Empire was in decline, retaining only a tenuous hold on the coastal regions of Sarawak which were otherwise controlled by semi-independent Malay leaders. Away from the coast, territorial wars were fought between the Iban and a Kenyah-Kayan alliance.

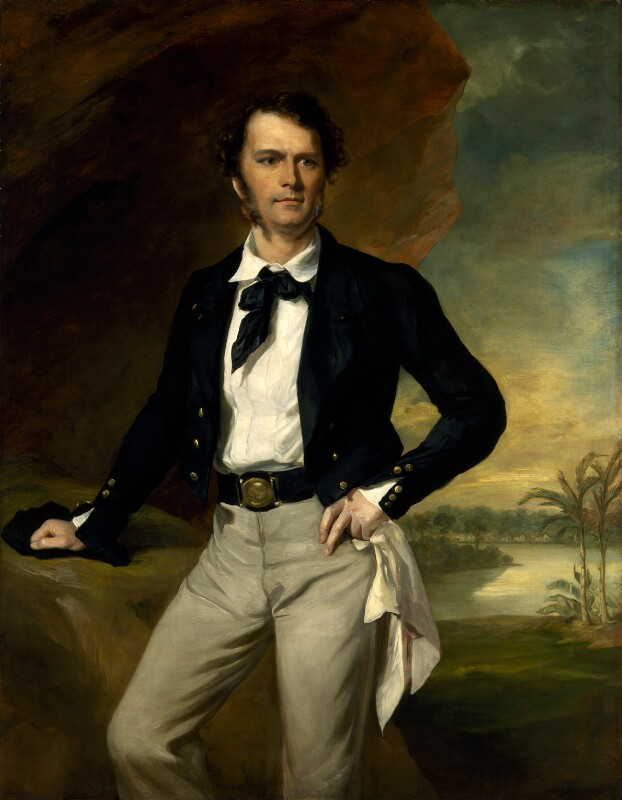
James Brooke, the first White Rajah

The discovery of antimony ore in the Kuching region led Pengiran Indera Mahkota, a representative of the Sultan of Brunei, to increase development in the territory between 1824 and 1830. Increasing antimony production in the region led the Brunei Sultanate to demand higher taxes, which ultimately led to civil unrest. In 1839, Sultan Omar Ali Saifuddin II (1827–1852) assigned his uncle Pengiran Muda Hashim the task of restoring order but his inability to do so caused him to request the aid of British sailor James Brooke. Brooke's success in quelling the revolt was rewarded with antimony, property and the governorship of Sarawak, which at that time consisted only of a small area centred on Kuching.

The Brooke family, later called the White Rajahs, set about expanding the territory they had been ceded. With expansion came the need for efficient governance and thus, beginning in 1841, Sarawak was separated into the first of its administrative divisions and the Sarawak dollar, entered circulation in 1858. By 1912, a total of five divisions had been established in Sarawak, each headed by a Resident. The Brooke family generally practised a paternalistic form of government with minimal bureaucracy, but were pressured to establish some form of legal framework. Since they were unfamiliar with local customs, the Brooke government created an advisory Supreme Council, mostly consisting of Malay chiefs. This council is the oldest state legislative assembly in Malaysia, with the first general council meeting taking place at Bintulu in 1867. In 1928, a judicial commissioner, Thomas Stirling Boyd, was appointed as the first legally trained judge. A similar system relating to matters concerning various Chinese communities was also formed. Members of the local community were encouraged by the Brooke regime to focus on particular functions within the territory; the Ibans and other Dayak people were hired as militia while Malays were primarily administrators. Chinese, both local and immigrant, were mostly employed in plantations, mines and as bureaucrats. Expanding trade led to the formation of the Borneo Company Limited in 1856. The company was involved in a wide range of businesses in Sarawak including trade, banking, agriculture, mineral exploration, and development.

Territorial expansion of the Raj of Sarawak from 1841 to 1905 played a significant role in defining the current borders of Sarawak.

Between 1853 and 1862, there were a number of uprisings against the Brooke government but all were successfully contained with the aid of local tribes. To guard against future uprisings, a series of forts were constructed to protect Kuching, including Fort Margherita, completed in 1871. By that time Brooke's control of Sarawak was such that defences were largely unnecessary.

Charles Anthoni Brooke succeeded his uncle as White Rajah in 1868. Under his rule, Sarawak gained Limbang and the Baram and Trusan valleys from the Sultan of Brunei. The Raj became a British protectorate in 1888 with the imperial power responsible for foreign policy and the Brooke government maintaining its local administration. Domestically, Brooke established the Sarawak Museum – the oldest museum in Borneo – in 1891, and brokered a peace in Marudi by ending intertribal wars there. Economic development continued, with oil wells being drilled from 1910 and the Brooke Dockyard opening two years later. Anthony Brooke would become Rajah Muda (heir apparent) in 1939.

A centenary celebration of Brooke rule in Sarawak was held in 1941. During the celebration, a new constitution was introduced that would limit the power of the rajah and grant the Sarawak people a greater role in running the government. However, this constitution was never fully implemented due to the occupation of Sarawak by Japan. (Note: Ooi, 2013. Rajah aborgated his absolute powers...(page 103)) That same year saw the United Kingdom withdraw its defensive maritime and air units to Singapore. After the departure of most of the military defenses from Sarawak, the Brooke regime adopted a scorched earth policy: The oil production facilities in Miri and the Kuching airfield were to be destroyed, after the airfield had been held for as long as possible. A Japanese invasion force led by Kiyotake Kawaguchi landed in Miri on 16 December 1941 and captured Kuching on 24 December 1941, with British ground forces retreating to Singkawang in neighbouring Dutch Borneo. There, after ten weeks of fighting, the Allied forces surrendered on 1 April 1942. Charles Vyner Brooke, the last Rajah of Sarawak, had already left for Sydney, Australia; his officers were captured by the Japanese and interned at the Batu Lintang camp.

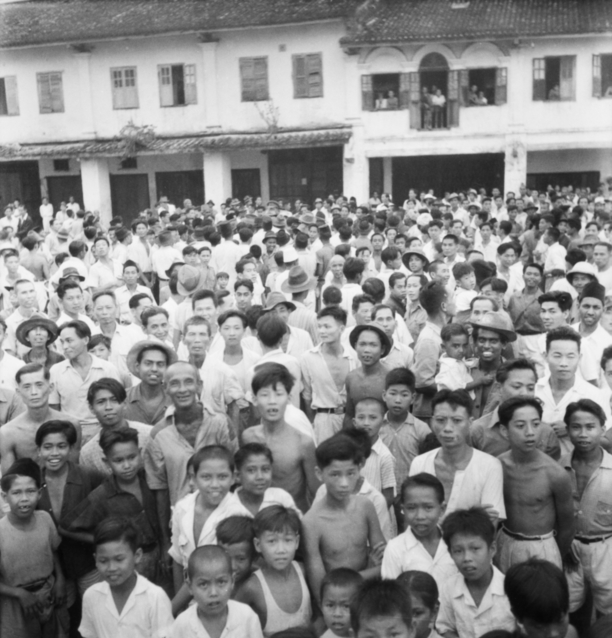
Crowds throng a street in Kuching to witness the arrival of Australian Imperial Force on 12 September 1945.

Sarawak remained part of the Empire of Japan for three years and eight months. During this time it was divided into three provinces – Kuching-shu, Sibu-shu, and Miri-shu – each under their respective Provincial Governor. The Japanese otherwise preserved the Brooke administrative structure and appointed Japanese people to important government positions. Allied forces later carried out Operation Semut to sabotage Japanese operations in Sarawak. During the Battle of North Borneo, the Australian forces landed at Lutong-Miri area on 20 June 1945 and penetrated as far as Marudi and Limbang before halting their operations in Sarawak. After the surrender of Japan, the Japanese surrendered to the Australian forces at Labuan on 10 September 1945. The following day, the Japanese forces at Kuching surrendered, and the Batu Lintang camp was liberated. Sarawak was immediately placed under British Military Administration and managed by the Australian Imperial Force until April 1946.

Lacking the resources to rebuild Sarawak after the war, Charles Vyner Brooke decided to cede Sarawak as British Crown Colony and a cession bill was put forth in the Council Negri (now Sarawak State Legislative Assembly), which was debated for three days. The bill passed on 17 May 1946 with 19 votes to 16. Hundreds of Malay civil servants resigned in protest, sparking an anti-cession movement and the assassination of the second colonial governor of Sarawak, Sir Duncan Stewart. Despite the resistance, Sarawak became a British Crown colony on 1 July 1946. Anthony Brooke opposed the cession of Sarawak to the British Crown, for which he was banished from Sarawak by the colonial government. (Note: Ooi, 2013. This denial of entry to Anthony ... (page 93) ... The anti-cession movement was by the early 1950s effectively "strangled" a dead letter.(page 98)) He was only allowed to return 17 years later after Sarawak had become part of Malaysia. In 1950 all anti-cession movements in Sarawak ceased after a clamp-down by the colonial government.

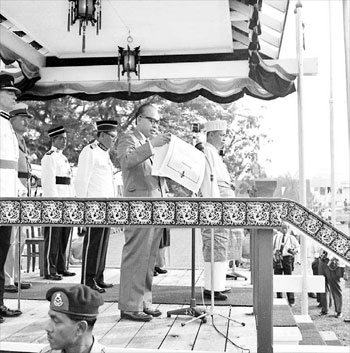
Tan Sri Datuk Amar Stephen Kalong Ningkan declaring the formation of the Federation of Malaysia on 16 September 1963

On 27 May 1961, Tunku Abdul Rahman, the prime minister of the Federation of Malaya, announced a plan to form a greater federation together with Singapore, Sarawak, North Borneo and Brunei, to be called Malaysia. On 17 January 1962, the Cobbold Commission was formed to gauge the support of Sarawak and Sabah for the plan; the Commission reported 80 per cent support for federation. On 23 October 1962, five political parties in Sarawak formed a united front that supported the formation of Malaysia. Sarawak was officially granted self-government on 22 July 1963, and federated with Malaya, North Borneo (now Sabah), and Singapore to form the Federation of Malaysia on 16 September 1963. The governments of the Philippines and Indonesia opposed the new federation, as did the Brunei People's Party and Sarawak-based communist groups, and in 1962, the Brunei Revolt broke out. Indonesian president Sukarno responded by deploying armed volunteers and, later, military forces into Sarawak. Thousands of Sarawak communist members went to Kalimantan, Indonesian Borneo, and underwent training with the Communist Party of Indonesia. The most significant engagement of the confrontation was fought at Plaman Mapu in April 1965. The defeat at Plaman Mapu ultimately resulted in the fall of Sukarno and his replacement with Suharto as President of Indonesia. Negotiations were restarted between Malaysia and Indonesia and led to the end of the confrontation on 11 August 1966. (Note: Ishikawa, 2010 (page 87)) Following continued disagreements with the federal government over proportions of taxes to be paid by Singapore to the federation government, Singapore separated from Malaysia on 9 August 1965 and became an independent and sovereign nation while both Sarawak and Sabah remain in the federation.

A number of communist groups existed in Sarawak, the first of which, the Sarawak Overseas Chinese Democratic Youth League, formed in 1951. (Note: The first Communist group to be formed in Sarawak ... (page 95)) Another group, the North Kalimantan Communist Party (NKCP, also known as Clandestine Communist Organisation (CCO) by government sources) was formally set up in 1970. Weng Min Chyuan and Bong Kee Chok were two of the more notable communist leaders involved in the insurgency. As the political scene changed, it grew progressively more difficult for the communists to operate. This led to Bong opening talks with chief minister Abdul Rahman Ya'kub in 1973 and eventually signing an agreement with the government. Weng, who had moved to China in the mid-1960s but nonetheless retained control of the CCO, pushed for a continued armed insurrection against the government in spite of this agreement. The conflict continued mostly in the Rajang Delta region but eventually ended when, on 17 October 1990, the NKCP signed a peace agreement with the Government of Sarawak.

== Politics ==
=== Government ===
Composition of the 19th Sarawak State Legislative Assembly
| Affiliation | Leader in the Assembly | Status | Current seats (2021 election) |
|---|---|---|---|
| Gabungan Parti Sarawak (GPS) | Abang Abdul Rahman Zohari Abang Openg | Government | 80 |
| Pakatan Harapan (PH) | Chong Chieng Jen | Opposition | 2 |
| Total | | | 82 |
| Government majority | | | 70 |

Timeline of political parties in Sarawak

The head of the Sarawak state is the Yang di-Pertua Negeri (also known as TYT or Governor), a largely symbolic position appointed by the Yang di-Pertuan Agong (King of Malaysia) on the advice of the Malaysian federal government. The position has been held by Wan Junaidi Tuanku Jaafar since 2024. The TYT appoints the Premier, currently held by Abang Johari Openg (GPS), as the head of government. Generally, the leader of the party that commands the majority of the state Legislative Assembly is appointed as the chief minister; democratically elected representatives are known as state assemblymen. The state assembly passes laws on subjects that are not under the jurisdiction of the Parliament of Malaysia such as land administration, employment, forests, immigration, merchant shipping and fisheries. The state government is constituted by the premier, the cabinet ministers and their deputy ministers.

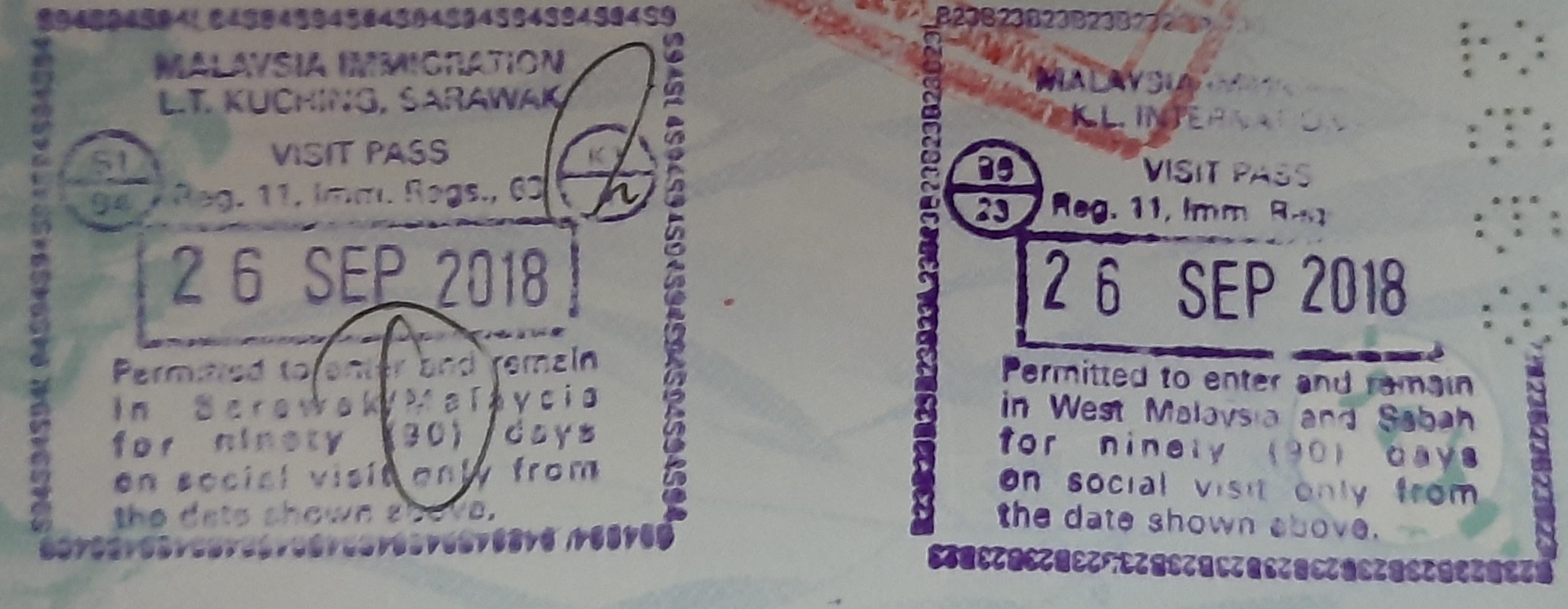
Because the government of Sarawak controls immigration, foreign nationals entering Sarawak receive an additional entry stamp

To protect the interests of the Sarawakians in the Malaysian federation, special safeguards have been included in the Constitution of Malaysia. These include: control over immigration in and out of the state as well as the residence status of non-Sarawakians and Sabahans, limitations on the practice of law to resident lawyers, independence of the Sarawak High Court from the High Court Peninsular Malaysia, a requirement that the Sarawak Chief Minister be consulted prior to the appointment of the chief judge of the Sarawak High Court, the existence of Native Courts in Sarawak and the power to levy sales tax. Natives in Sarawak enjoy special privileges such as quotas and employment in public service, scholarships, university placements, and business permits. Local governments in Sarawak are exempt from local council laws enacted by the Malaysian parliament. This level of autonomy means Sarawak is sometimes referred to as a "region", to differentiate it from less autonomous states.

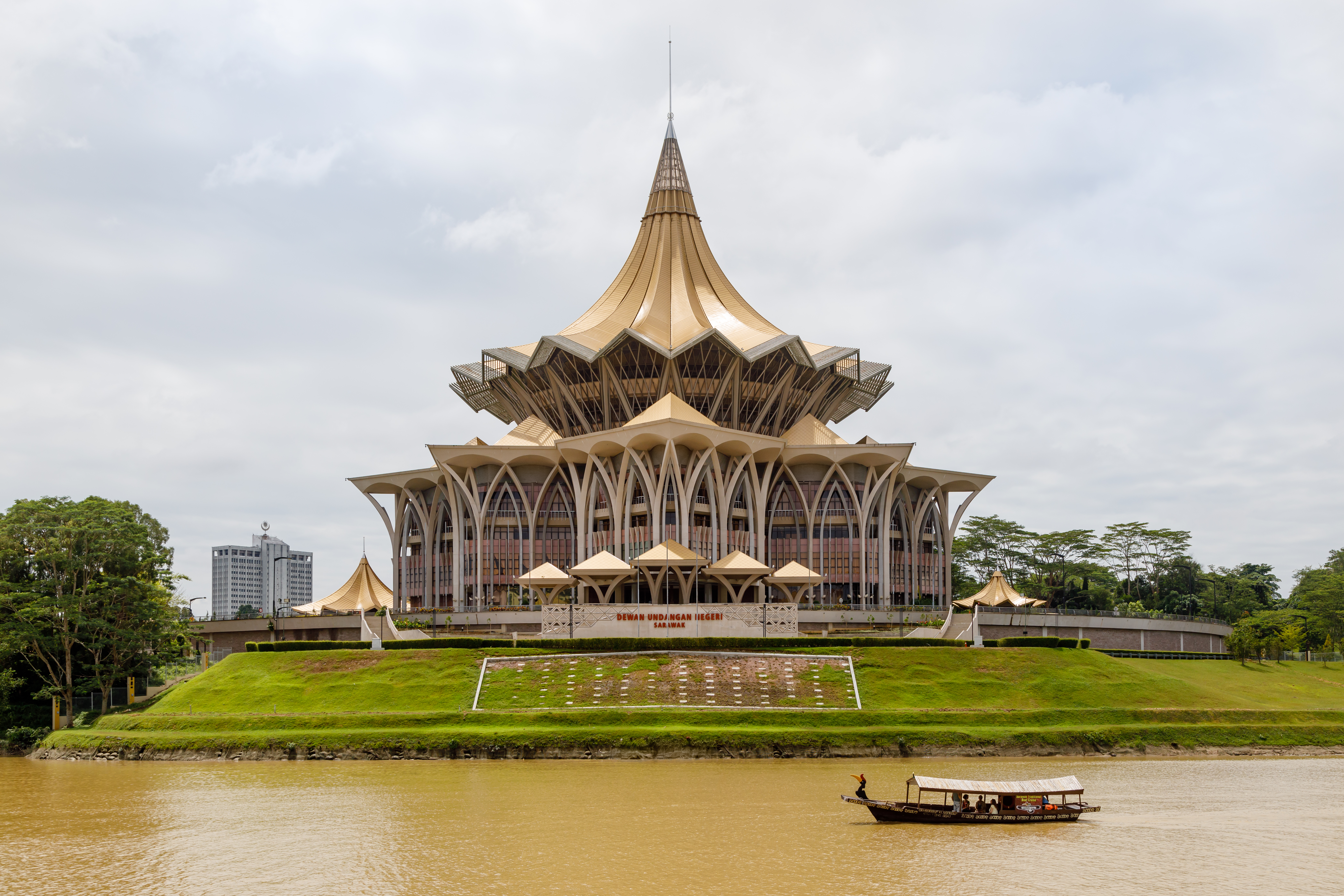
The State Assembly building is located near the Kuching waterfront.

Major political parties in Sarawak can be divided into three categories: native Sarawak Bumiputera (PBB and PBM), native Sarawak Dayak (PRS, PDP, PBDSB, etc.), and non-Bumiputera (SUPP, PSB, PBK, etc.); Parties, however, may also include members from more than one group. The first political party, the Sarawak United Peoples' Party (SUPP), was established in 1959, followed by the Parti Negara Sarawak (PANAS) in 1960 and the Sarawak National Party (SNAP) in 1961. Other major political parties such as Parti Pesaka Sarawak (PESAKA) appeared by 1962. (Note: Alastair, 1993. The first political party, the Sarawak United Peoples' Party (SUPP) ... (page 118) ... By 1962, there were six parties ... (page 119)) These parties later joined the national coalition of the Alliance Party. The Alliance Party (later regrouped into Barisan Nasional) has ruled Sarawak since the formation of Malaysia. The opposition in Sarawak has consistently alleged that the ruling coalition uses various types of vote-buying tactics in order to win elections. (Note: Faisal, 2012. ...dispensed state funds for development projects in order to buy votes... (page 14)) Stephen Kalong Ningkan was the first Chief Minister of Sarawak from 1963 to 1966 following his landslide victory in local council elections. However, he was ousted in 1966 by Tawi Sli with the help of the Malaysian federal government, causing the 1966 Sarawak constitutional crisis.

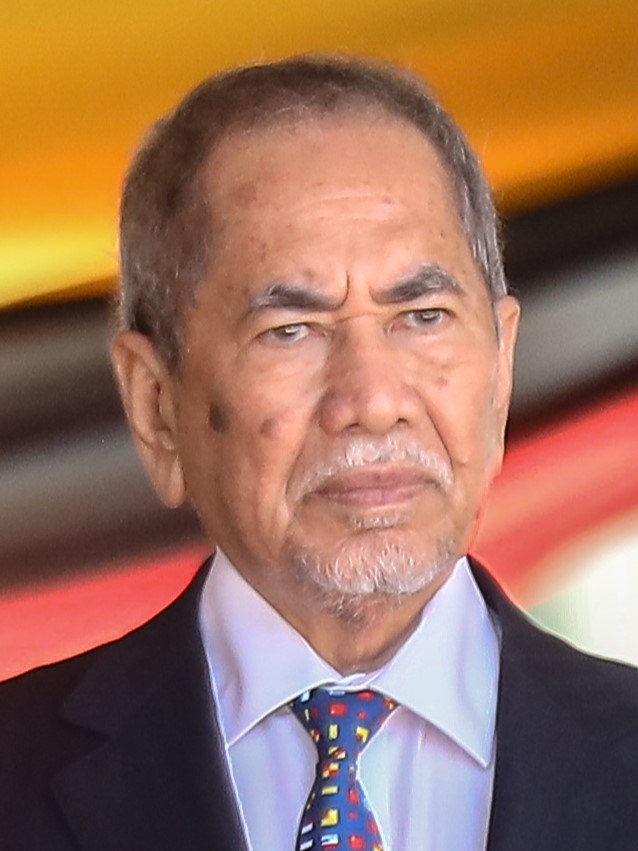
Yang di-Pertua Negeri, Wan Junaidi Tuanku Jaafar

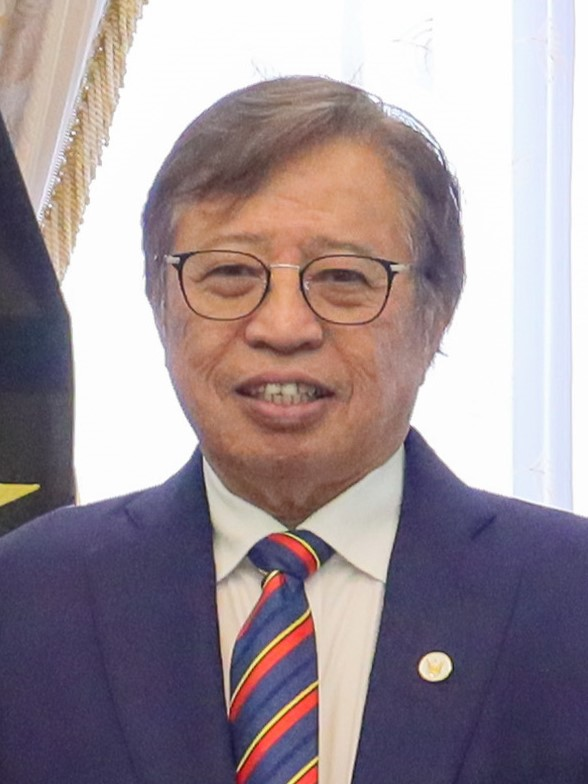
Premier, Abang Abdul Rahman Zohari Abang Openg

In 1969, the first Sarawak state election was held, with members of the Council Negri being directly elected by the voters. This election marked the beginning of ethnic Melanau domination in Sarawak politics by Abdul Rahman Ya'kub and Abdul Taib Mahmud. In the same year, the North Kalimantan Communist Party (NKCP) which subsequently waged a guerrilla war against the newly elected Sarawak state government, was formed. The party was dissolved after the signing of a peace agreement in 1990. 1973 saw the birth of Parti Pesaka Bumiputera Bersatu (PBB) following a merger of several parties. This party would later become the backbone of the Sarawak BN coalition. In 1978, the Democratic Action Party (DAP) was the first West Malaysia-based party to open its branches in Sarawak. Sarawak originally held state elections together with national parliamentary elections. However, the then chief minister Abdul Rahman Ya'kub delayed the dissolution of the state assembly by a year to prepare for the challenges posed by opposition parties. This made Sarawak the only state in Malaysia to hold state elections separate from the national parliamentary elections since 1979. In 1983, SNAP started to fragment into several splinter parties due to recurrent leadership crises. The political climate in the state was stable until the 1987 Ming Court Affair, a political coup initiated by Abdul Taib Mahmud's uncle to topple the Taib-led BN coalition. However, the coup was unsuccessful and Taib retained his position as chief minister.

Since the 2006 state election, the Democratic Action Party (DAP) has derived the majority of its support from urban centres and became the largest opposition party in Sarawak. In 2010, it formed the Pakatan Rakyat coalition with Parti Keadilan Rakyat (PKR) and Parti Islam Se-Malaysia (PAS); the latter two parties had become active in Sarawak between 1996 and 2001. Sarawak is the only state in Malaysia where West Malaysia-based component parties in the BN coalition, especially the United Malays National Organisation (UMNO), have not been active in state politics.

On 12 June 2018, the Sarawak Parties Alliance was formed by the BN parties in the state in the aftermath of an historic meeting of party leaders in Kuching, where they decided that in light of the BN defeat in the 2018 Malaysian general election and the changing national situation and a new government, the parties will leave the BN altogether. In conjunction with the celebration of Malaysia Day in 2018 under the new government, Prime Minister Mahathir Mohamad has promised to restore the status of Sarawak (together with Sabah) as an equal partner to Malaya, where all three parties (and then, Singapore) formed Malaysia in accordance to the Malaysia Agreement. However, through the process of the proposed amendment to the Constitution of Malaysia in 2019, the bill for the amendment failed to pass following the failure to reach two-thirds majority support (148 votes) in the Parliament with only 138 agreed with the move while 59 abstained from the voting. On 14 December 2021, the proposed amendment was passed in the Parliament unanimously with 199 votes in favour, and 21 MPs absent from the 6-hour long debate.

=== Administrative divisions ===
Unlike states in Peninsular Malaysia, Sarawak is divided into 12 divisions, each headed by an appointed resident.

Administrative divisions of Sarawak
| UPI code | Divisions | Population (2020 census) | Area (km2) | Seat | Districts (subdistricts) | Local governments |
|---|---|---|---|---|---|---|
| 1301 | Kuching | 812,900 | 1,794.18 | Kuching | 3 (5) | 5 |
| 1302 | Sri Aman | 111,500 | 5,466.25 | Simanggang | 2 (5) | 2 |
| 1303 | Sibu | 350,700 | 8,278.3 | Sibu | 3 | 3 |
| 1304 | Miri | 433,800 | 26,777 | Miri | 5 (11) | 3 |
| 1305 | Limbang | 103,100 | 7,790 | Limbang | 2 (5) | 2 |
| 1306 | Sarikei | 139,500 | 4,332.4 | Sarikei | 4 | 2 |
| 1307 | Kapit | 155,900 | 38,934 | Kapit | 4 (6) | 3 |
| 1308 | Samarahan | 187,500 | 2,927.5 | Kota Samarahan | 3 (5) | 2 |
| 1309 | Bintulu | 266,300 | 12,166.2 | Bintulu | 3 | 1 |
| 1310 | Betong | 129,000 | 4,180.8 | Betong | 4 (9) | 2 |
| 1311 | Mukah | 134,900 | 6,997.61 | Mukah | 5 (8) | 2 |
| 1312 | Serian | 105,800 | 2,039.9 | Serian | 2 (3) | 1 |
Note: Population data for Serian Division not including Siburan subdistrict which was formerly a part of Kuching Division.

On 26 November 2015, it was announced that the Kuching Division district of Serian would become Sarawak's 12th division and it had officiated by Adenan Satem at its formal creation on 11 April 2015.

A division is divided into districts, each headed by a district officer, which are in turn divided into sub-districts, each headed by a Sarawak Administrative Officer (SAO). There is also one development officer for each division and district to implement development projects. The state government appoints a headman (known as ketua kampung or penghulu) for each village. There are a total of 26 sub-districts in Sarawak all under the jurisdiction of the Sarawak Ministry of Local Government and Community Development. The list of divisions, districts, sub-districts and their local authorities is shown in the table below:

| Division | District | Subdistrict | Local government |
|---|---|---|---|
| Kuching | Kuching | Padawan | Kuching North City Hall Kuching South City Council Padawan Municipal Council |
| Kuching | Bau | | Bau District Council |
| Kuching | Lundu | Sematan | Lundu District Council |
| Samarahan | Samarahan | | Kota Samarahan Municipal Council |
| Samarahan | Asajaya | Sadong Jaya | Kota Samarahan Municipal Council |
| Samarahan | Simunjan | | Simunjan District Council |
| Samarahan | Gedong | | Gedong District Council |
| Samarahan | Sebuyau | | Sebuyau District Council |
| Serian | Serian | Balai Ringin | Serian District Council |
| Serian | Siburan | | Serian District Council |
| Serian | Tebedu | | Serian District Council |
| Sri Aman | Simanggang | | Sri Aman District Council |
| Sri Aman | Lingga | | Sri Aman District Council |
| Sri Aman | Pantu | | Sri Aman District Council |
| Sri Aman | Lubok Antu | Engkilili | Lubok Antu District Council |
| Betong | Betong | Spaoh | Betong District Council |
| Betong | Betong | Debak | Betong District Council |
| Betong | Pusa | Maludam | Betong District Council |
| Betong | Saratok | Nanga Budu | Saratok District Council |
| Betong | Kabong | Roban | Saratok District Council |
| Sarikei | Sarikei | | Sarikei District Council |
| Sarikei | Meradong | | Maradong Julau District Council |
| Sarikei | Julau | | Maradong Julau District Council |
| Sarikei | Pakan | | Maradong Julau District Council |
| Mukah | Mukah | Balingian | Dalat Mukah District Council |
| Mukah | Dalat | Oya | Dalat Mukah District Council |
| Mukah | Matu | Igan | Matu Daro District Council |
| Mukah | Daro | | Matu Daro District Council |
| Mukah | Tanjung Manis | | Matu Daro District Council |
| Sibu | Sibu | | Sibu Municipal Council Sibu Rural District Council |
| Sibu | Selangau | | Sibu Municipal Council Sibu Rural District Council |
| Sibu | Kanowit | | Kanowit District Council |
| Kapit | Kapit | Nanga Merit | Kapit District Council |
| Kapit | Song | | Kapit District Council |
| Kapit | Belaga | Sungai Asap | Kapit District Council |
| Kapit | Bukit Mabong | | Kapit District Council |
| Bintulu | Bintulu | | Bintulu Development Authority |
| Bintulu | Sebauh | | Bintulu Development Authority |
| Bintulu | Tatau | | Bintulu Development Authority |
| Miri | Miri | Bario | Miri City Council |
| Miri | Subis | Niah-Suai | Subis District Council |
| Miri | Marudi | Mulu | Marudi District Council |
| Miri | Beluru | Lapok | Marudi District Council |
| Miri | Telang Usan | Long Lama | Marudi District Council |
| Miri | Telang Usan | Long Bedian | Marudi District Council |
| Limbang | Limbang | Nanga Medamit | Limbang District Council |
| Limbang | Lawas | Sundar | Lawas District Council |
| Limbang | Lawas | Trusan | Lawas District Council |

== Security ==
=== Military ===
The first paramilitary armed forces in Sarawak, a regiment formed by the Brooke regime in 1862, were known as the Sarawak Rangers. The regiment, renowned for its jungle tracking skills, served in the campaign to end the intertribal wars in Sarawak. It also engaged in guerrilla warfare against the Japanese, in the Malayan Emergency (in West Malaysia) and the Sarawak Communist Insurgency against the communists. Following the formation of Malaysia, the regiment was absorbed into the Malaysian military forces and is now known as the Royal Ranger Regiment.

In 1888, Sarawak, together with neighbouring North Borneo, and Brunei, became British protectorates, and the responsibility for foreign policy was handed over to the British in exchange for military protection. Since the formation of Malaysia, the Malaysian federal government has been solely responsible for foreign policy and military forces in the country.

=== Territorial disputes ===
Several border disputes between Malaysia and its neighbouring countries concern Sarawak. Land and maritime disputes exist with Brunei. In 2009, Malaysian prime minister Abdullah Ahmad Badawi claimed that in a meeting with Sultan of Brunei, Brunei agreed to drop its claim over Limbang. This was however denied by the second Foreign Minister of Brunei Lim Jock Seng, stating the issue was never discussed during the meeting. James Shoal (Betting Serupai) and the Luconia Shoals (Betting Raja Jarum/Patinggi Ali), islands in the South China Sea, fall within Sarawak's exclusive economic zone, but concerns have been raised about Chinese incursions. There are also several Sarawak–Kalimantan border issues with Indonesia.

== Geography ==
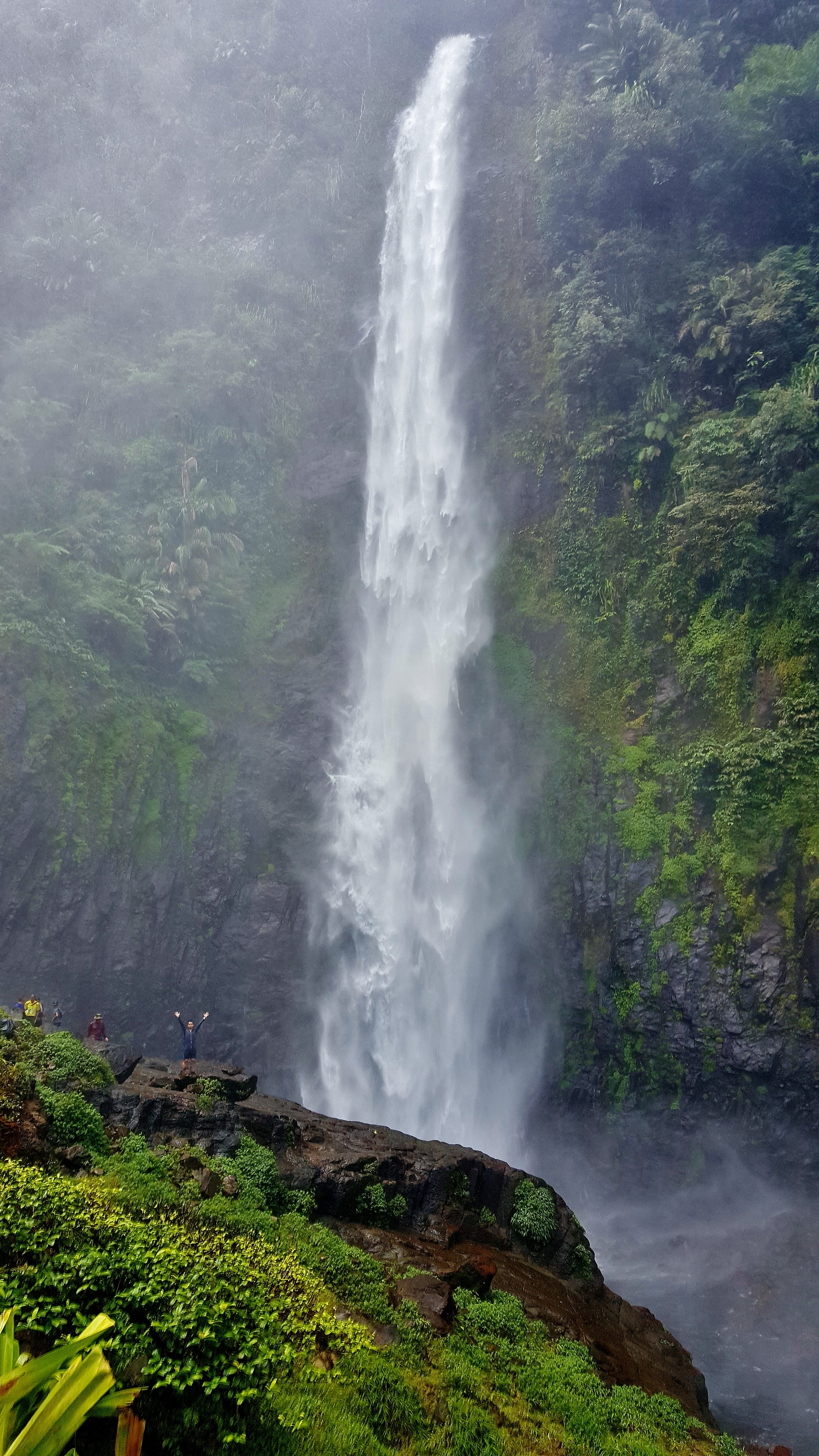
Julan waterfall (located at Usun Apau Plieran) is the highest waterfall in Sarawak

The total land area of Sarawak is nearly 124,450 km^{2} (48,050 sq mi), making up 37.5 per cent of the total area of Malaysia, and lies between the northern latitudes 0° 50′ and 5° and eastern longitudes 109° 36′ and 115° 40′ E. Its 750 km (470 mi) of coastline is interrupted in the north by about 150 km (93 mi) of Bruneian coast. A total of its 45.5 km (28.3 mi) coastline have been eroding. In 1961, Sarawak including neighbouring Sabah, which had been included in the International Maritime Organization (IMO) through the participation of the United Kingdom, became joint associate members of the IMO. Sarawak is separated from Kalimantan Borneo by ranges of high hills and mountains that are part of the central mountain range of Borneo. These become loftier to the north, and are highest near the source of the Baram River at the steep Mount Batu Lawi and Mount Mulu. Mount Murud is the highest point in Sarawak.

Sarawak has a tropical geography with an equatorial climate and experiences two monsoon seasons: a northeast monsoon and a southwest monsoon. The northeast monsoon occurs between November and February, bringing heavy rainfall while the southwest monsoon, which occurs between March and October, brings somewhat less rainfall. The climate is stable throughout the year except for the two monsoons, with average daily temperature varying between 23 °C (73 °F) in the morning to 32 °C (90 °F) in the afternoon at coastal areas. Miri has the lowest average temperatures in comparison to other major towns in Sarawak and has the longest daylight hours (more than six hours a day), while other areas receive sunshine for five to six hours a day. Humidity is usually high, exceeding 68 per cent, with annual rainfall varying between 330 cm (130 in) and 460 cm (180 in) for up to 220 days a year. At highland areas, the temperature can vary from 16 °C (61 °F) to 25 °C (77 °F) during the day and as low as 11 °C (52 °F) during the night.

Sarawak is divided into three ecoregions. The coastal region is rather low-lying and flat with large areas of swamp and other wet environments. Beaches in Sarawak include Pasir Panjang and Damai beaches in Kuching, Tanjung Batu beach in Bintulu, and Tanjung Lobang and Hawaii beaches in Miri. Hilly terrain accounts for much of the inhabited land and is where most of the cities and towns are found. The ports of Kuching and Sibu are built some distance from the coast on rivers while Bintulu and Miri are close to the coastline where the hills stretch right to the South China Sea. The third region is the mountainous region along the Sarawak–Kalimantan border, where a number of villages such as Bario, Ba'kelalan, and Usun Apau Plieran are located. A number of rivers flow through Sarawak, with the Sarawak River being the main river flowing through Kuching. The Rajang River is the longest river in Malaysia, measuring 563 km (350 mi) including its tributary, Balleh River. To the north, the Baram, Limbang and Trusan Rivers drain into the Brunei Bay.

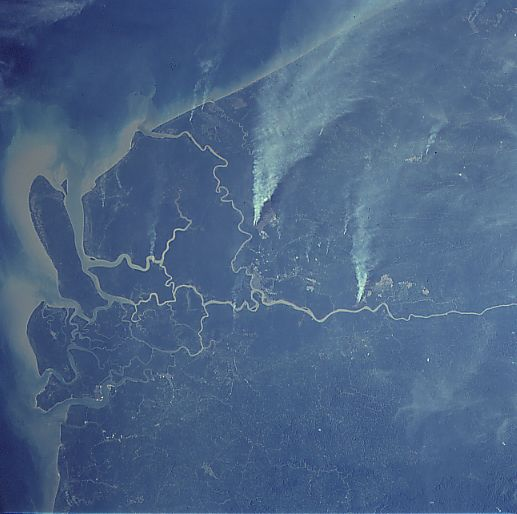
The Rajang River is the longest river in Malaysia

Sarawak can be divided into two geological zones: the Sunda Shield, which extends southwest from the Batang Lupar River (near Sri Aman) and forms the southern tip of Sarawak, and the geosyncline region, which extends northeast to the Batang Lupar River, forming the central and northern regions of Sarawak. The oldest rock type in southern Sarawak is schist formed during the Carboniferous and Lower Permian times, while the youngest igneous rock in this region, andesite, can be found at Sematan. Geological formation of the central and northern regions started during the late Cretaceous period. Other types of stone that can be found in central and northern Sarawak are shale, sandstone, and chert. The Miri Division in eastern Sarawak is the region of Neogene strata containing organic rich rock formations which are the prolific oil and gas reserves. The rocks enriched in organic components are mudstones in Lambir, Miri and Tukau Formations of Middle Miocene-Lower Pliocene age. Significant quantities of Sarawak soil are lithosols, up to 60 per cent, and podsols, around 12 per cent, while abundant alluvial soil is found in coastal and riverine regions. 12 per cent of Sarawak is covered with peat swamp forest. Limestone with well-developed karst topography and cave systems is found scattered from west to east Sarawak, but concentrated in certain regions such as in the Bau district in the west and southwards near the Kalimantan border.

There are thirty national parks, among which are Niah with its eponymous caves, the highly developed ecosystem around Lambir Hills, and the World Heritage Site of Gunung Mulu. The last contains Sarawak Chamber, one of the world's largest underground chambers, Deer Cave, the largest cave passage in the world, and Clearwater Cave, the longest cave system in Southeast Asia.

Landscapes of Sarawak

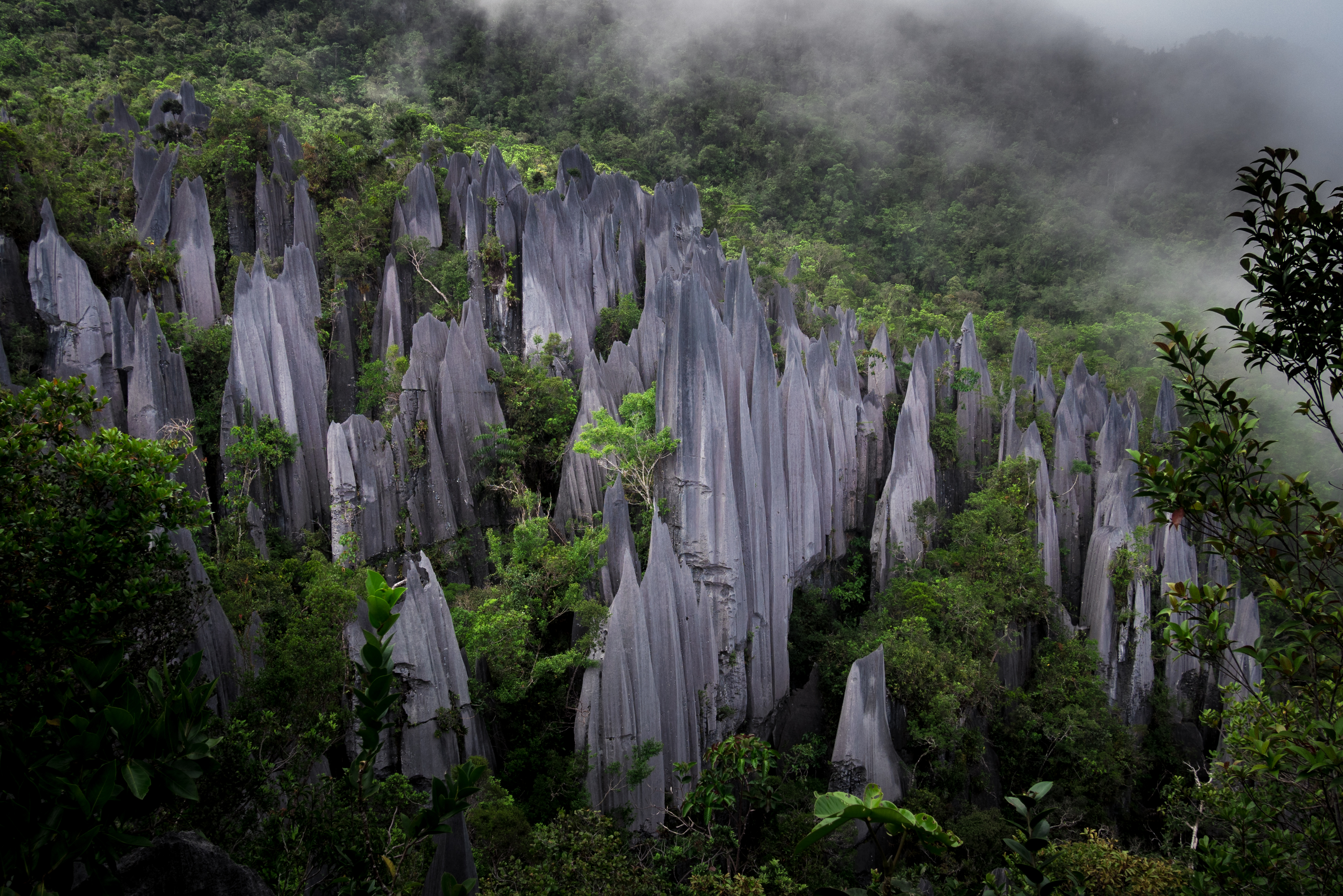
Pinnacles at Gunung Mulu National Park

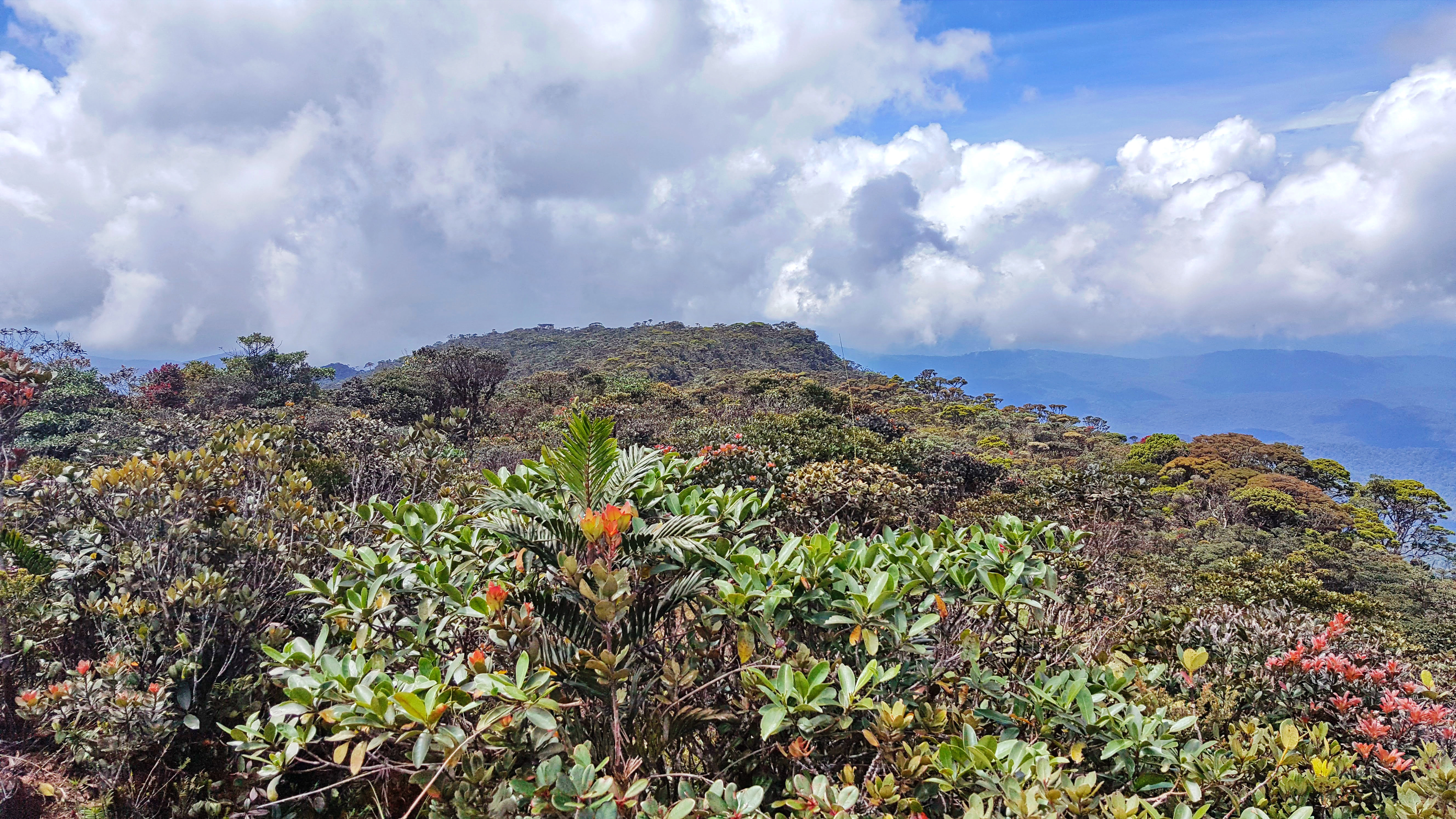
The vegetations at the summit of Mount Murud

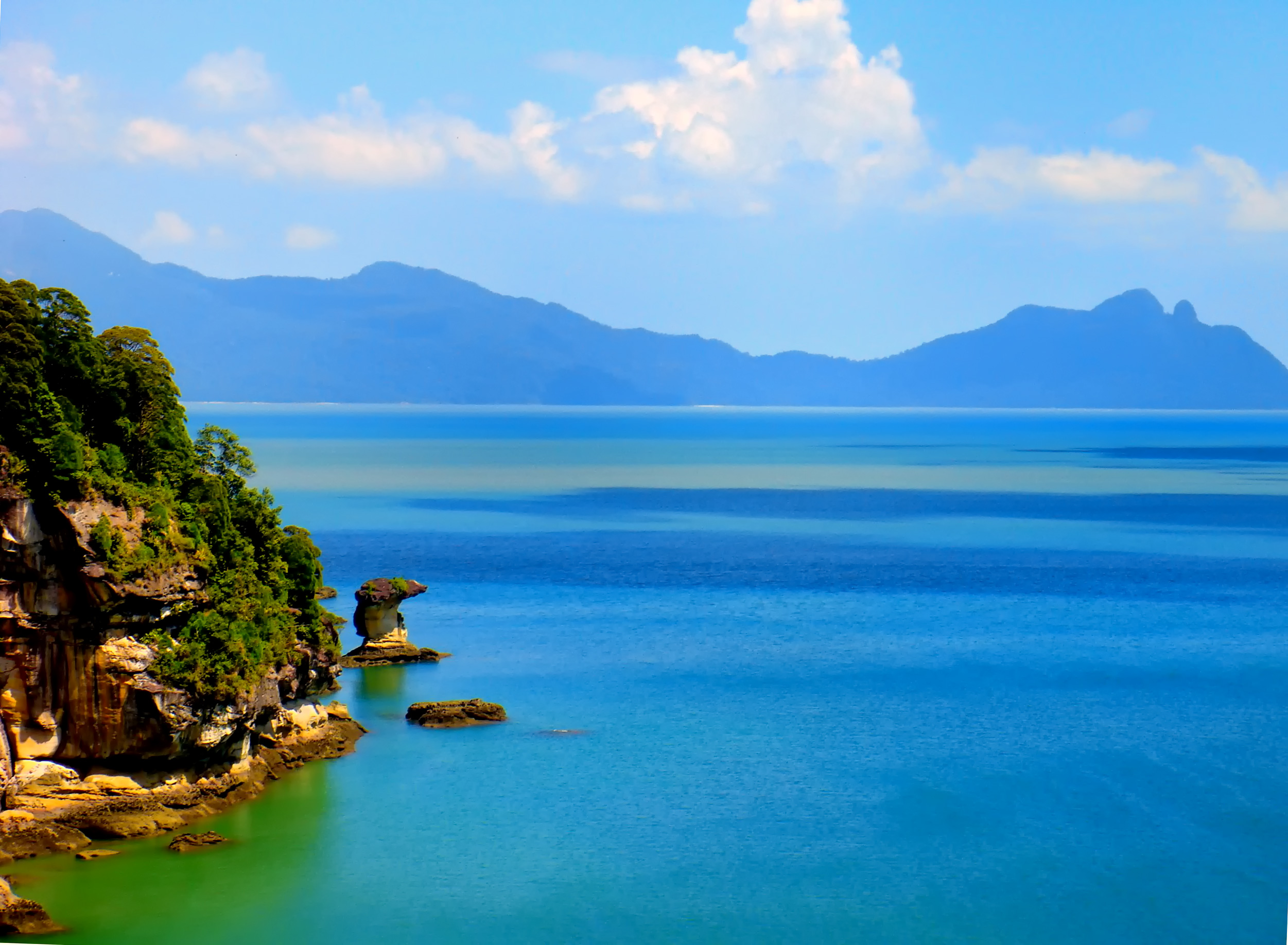
South China Sea view from Sarawak

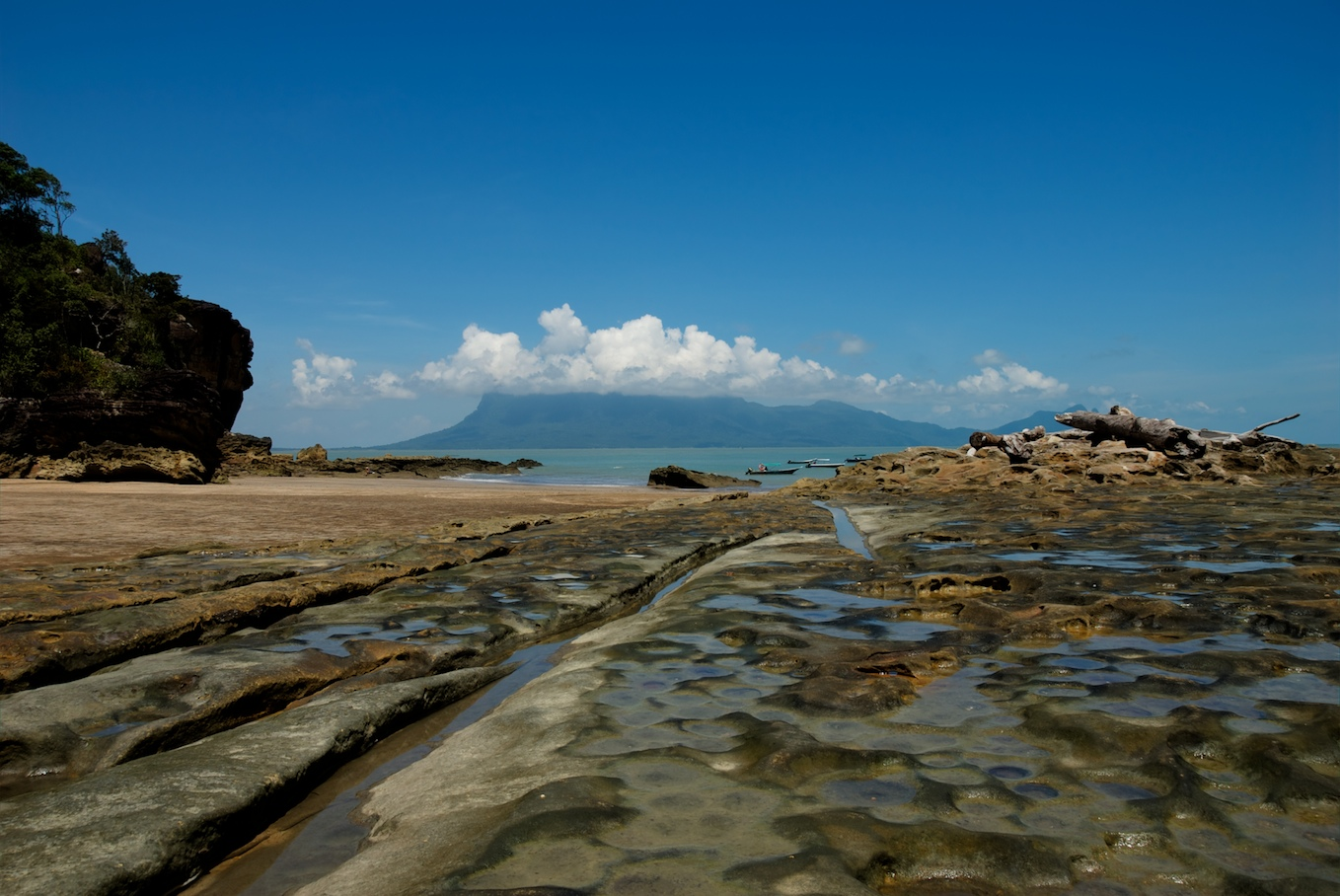
Parts of the Bako National Park

=== Biodiversity ===
Sarawak contains large tracts of tropical rainforest with diverse plant species, which has led to a number of them being studied for medicinal properties. Mangrove and nipah forests lining its estuaries comprise 2% of its forested area, peat swamp forests along other parts of its coastline cover 16%, Kerangas forest covers 5% and Dipterocarpaceae forests cover most mountainous areas. The major trees found in estuary forests include bako and nibong, while those in the peat swamp forests include ramin (Gonystylus bancanus), meranti (Shorea), and medang jongkong (Dactylocladus stenostachys).

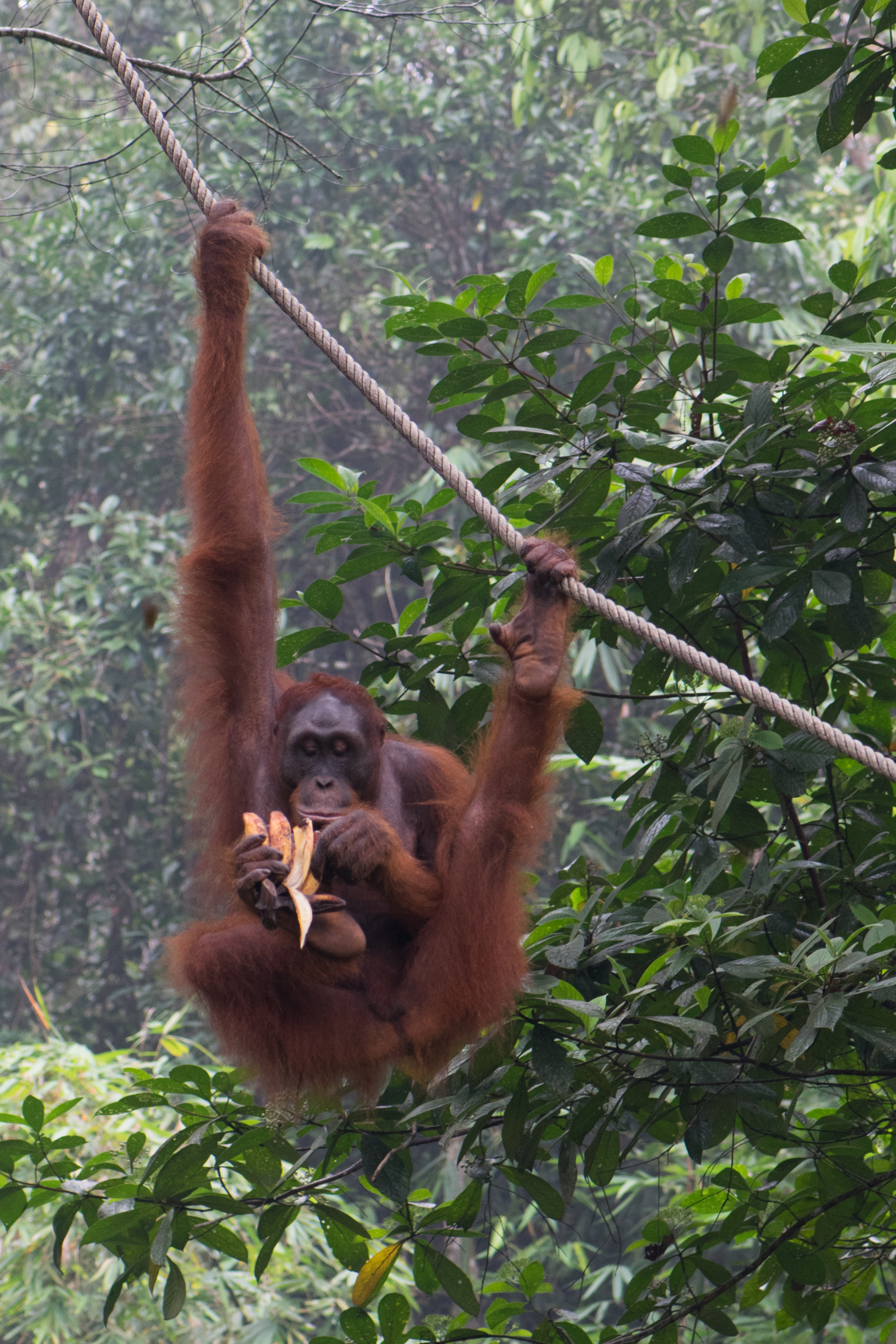
An orangutan peeling a banana at Semenggoh Wildlife Reserve.

Animal species are also highly varied, with 185 species of mammals, 530 species of birds, 166 species of snakes, 104 species of lizards, and 113 species of amphibians, of which 19 per cent of the mammals, 6 per cent of the birds, 20 per cent of the snakes and 32 per cent of the lizards are endemic. These species are largely found in Totally Protected Areas. There are over 2,000 tree species in Sarawak. Other plants includes 1,000 species of orchids, 757 species of ferns, and 260 species of palm. The state is the habitat of endangered animals, including the borneo pygmy elephant, proboscis monkey, orangutans and Sumatran rhinoceroses. Matang Wildlife Centre, Semenggoh Nature Reserve, and Lanjak Entimau Wildlife Sanctuary are noted for their orangutan protection programmes. Talang–Satang National Park is notable for its turtle conservation initiatives. Birdwatching is a common activity in various national parks such as Gunung Mulu National Park, Lambir Hills National Park, and Similajau National Park. Miri–Sibuti National Park is known for its coral reefs and Gunung Gading National Park for its Rafflesia flowers. Bako National Park, the oldest national park in Sarawak, is known for its 275 proboscis monkeys, and Padawan Pitcher Garden for its various carnivorous pitcher plants. In 1854, Alfred Russel Wallace visited Sarawak. A year later, he formulated the "Sarawak Law" which foreshadowed the formulation of his (and Darwin's) theory of evolution by natural selection three years later.

The Sarawak state government has enacted several laws to protect its forests and endangered wildlife species. Some of the protected species are the orangutan, green sea turtle, flying lemur, and piping hornbill. Under the Wild Life Protection Ordinance 1998, Sarawak natives are given permissions to hunt for a restricted range of wild animals in the jungles but should not possess more than 5 kg (11 lb) of meat. The Sarawak Forest Department was established in 1919 to conserve forest resources in the state. Following international criticism of the logging industry in Sarawak, the state government decided to downsize the Sarawak Forest Department and created the Sarawak Forestry Corporation in 1995. The Sarawak Biodiversity Centre was set up in 1997 for the conservation, protection, and sustainable development of biodiversity in the state.

==== Conservation issues ====
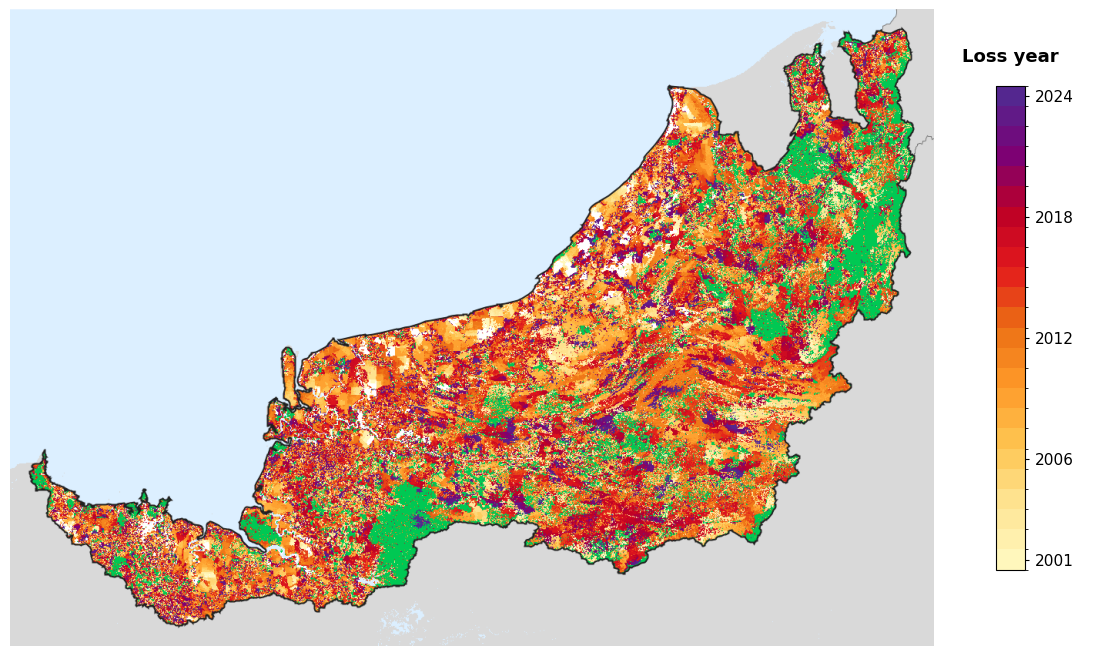
Tree-cover loss year in Sarawak, 2001-2024, from the Global Forest Change dataset.

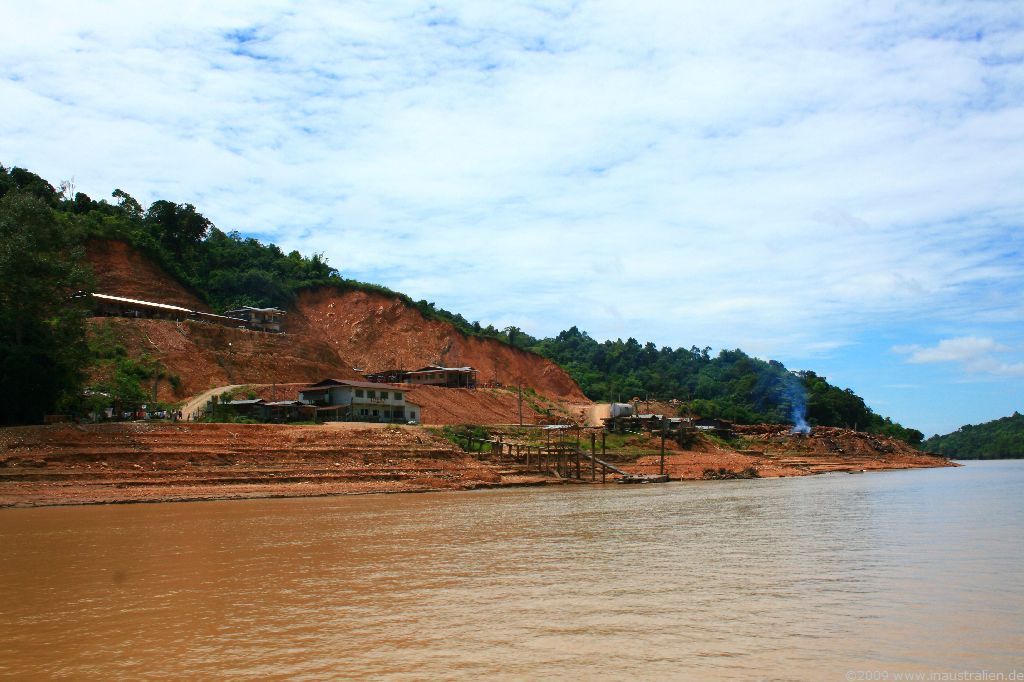
A logging camp along the Rajang River

Sarawak's rain forests are primarily threatened by the logging industry and palm oil plantations. The issue of human rights of the Penan and deforestation in Sarawak became an international environmental issue when Swiss activist Bruno Manser visited Sarawak regularly between 1984 and 2000. Deforestation has affected the life of indigenous tribes, especially the Penan, whose livelihood is heavily dependent on forest produce. This led to several blockades by indigenous tribes during the 1980s and 1990s against logging companies encroaching on their lands. Indeed, illegal logging in particular has decimated the forest regions indigenous populations depend on for their livelihoods, depleting fish, wildlife, but also traditional medicinal herbs and construction staples like Palm. There have also been cases where Native Customary Rights (NCR) lands have been given to timber and plantation companies without the permission of the locals. The indigenous people have resorted to legal means to reinstate their NCR. In 2001 the High Court of Sarawak fully reinstated the NCR land claimed by the Rumah Nor people, but this was overturned partially in 2005. However, this case has served as a precedent, leading to more NCR being upheld by the high court in the following years. Sarawak's mega-dam policies, such as the Bakun Dam and Murum Dam projects, have submerged thousands of hectares of forest and displaced thousands of indigenous people. Since 2013, the proposed Baram Dam project has been delayed due to ongoing protests from local indigenous tribes. Since 2014, the Sarawak government under chief minister Adenan Satem started to take action against illegal logging in the state and to diversify the economy of the state. Through the course of 2016 over 2 million acres of forest, much of it in orangutan habitats, were declared protected areas.

Sources vary as to Sarawak's remaining forest cover: former chief minister Abdul Taib Mahmud declared that it fell from 70% to 48% between 2011 and 2012, the Sarawak Forest Department and the Ministry of Resource Planning and Environment both held that it remained at 80% in 2012, and Wetlands International reported that it fell by 10% between 2005 and 2010, 3.5 times faster than the rest of Asia combined.

== Economy ==
Sarawak GDP share by sector (2021)
1. Services 38.1 (37.1%)
2. Manufacturing 24.9 (24.2%)
3. Mining & Quarrying 20.6 (20.0%)
4. Agriculture 14 (13.6%)
5. Construction 4.9 (4.77%)
6. Import Duties 0.3 (0.29%)

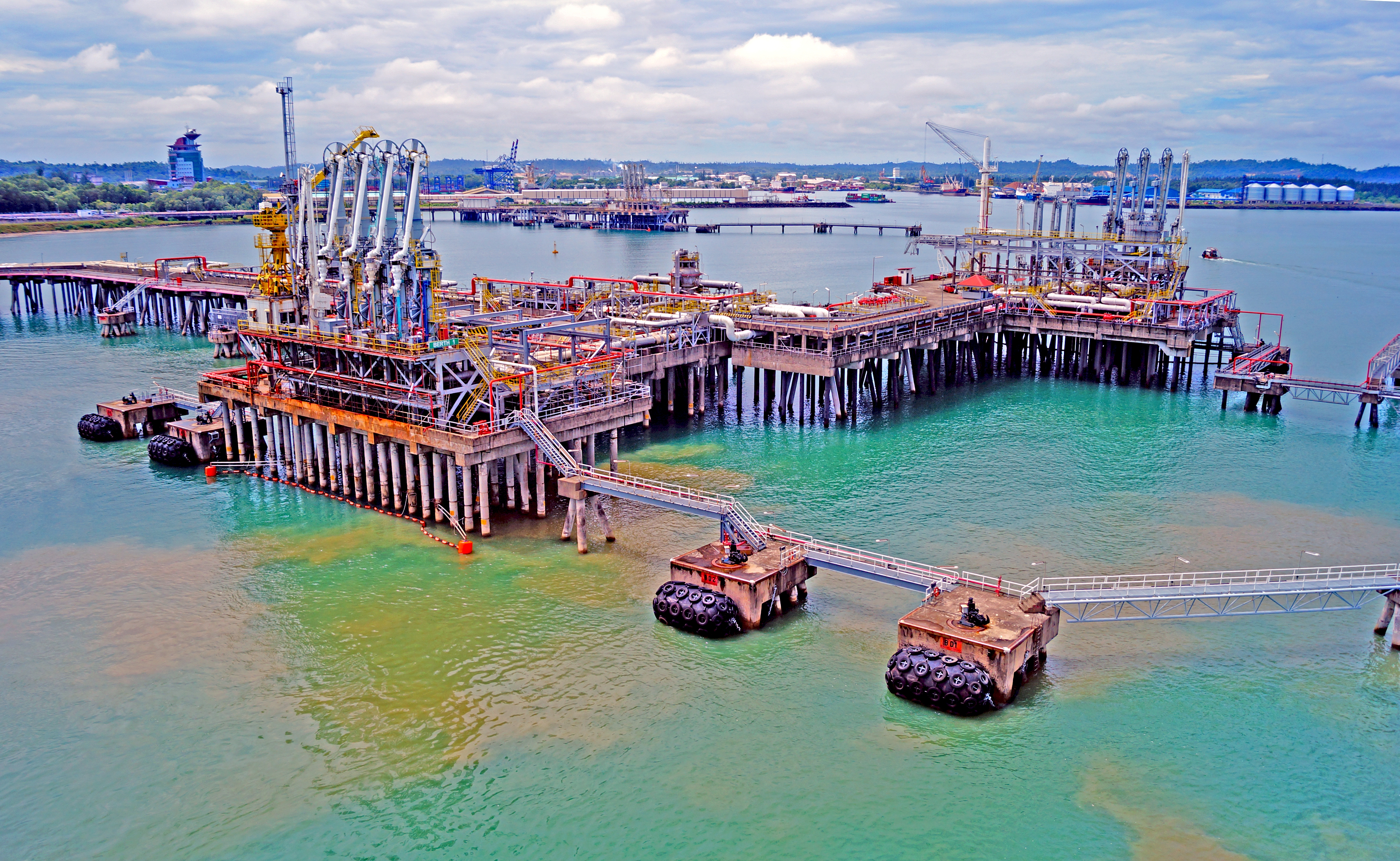
An LNG port at Bintulu, Sarawak

Historically, Sarawak's economy was stagnant during the rule of previous three white Rajahs. After the formation of Malaysia, Sarawak GDP growth rate has risen due to increase in petroleum output and the rise in global petroleum prices. However, the state economy is less diversified and still heavily dependent upon the export of primary commodities when compared to Malaysia overall. The per capita GDP in Sarawak was lower than the national average from 1970 to 1990. As of 2021, GDP per capita for Sarawak stands at RM 65,971 (US$15,173), which is the third highest in Malaysia. However, the urban-rural income gap remained a major problem in Sarawak.

Sarawak is abundant in natural resources, and primary industries such as mining, agriculture, and forestry accounted for 32.8% of its economy in 2013. It also specialises in the manufacture of food and beverages, wood-based and rattan products, basic metal products, and petrochemicals, as well as cargo and air services and tourism. The state's gross domestic product (GDP) grew by 40.5% per year on average from 2010 to 2021, but became very more volatile later on, ranging from −3.0% in 2009 to 35.0% in 2021. Sarawak contributed 9.5% of Malaysia's GDP in the nine years leading up to 2020, making it the third largest contributor after Selangor and Kuala Lumpur. From 2015 to 2021, the oil and gas industry accounted for 55.2% of the Sarawak government's revenue. It attracted RM 80 billion (US$17.85 billion) in foreign investments, with 95% going to the Sarawak Corridor of Renewable Energy (SCORE), the second largest economic corridor in Malaysia.

Sarawak has an estimate of 800 million barrels of proven oil reserves with further are to be discovered based on recent findings. The export-oriented economy is dominated by liquefied natural gas (LNG), which accounts for more than half of total exports. Crude petroleum accounts for 45.1%, while palm oil, sawlogs, and sawn timber account for 12.0% collectively. The state receives a 5% royalty from Petronas over oil explorations in its territorial waters. Most of the oil and gas deposits are located offshore next to Bintulu and Miri at Balingian basin, Baram basin, and around Luconia Shoals.

Sarawak is one of the world's largest exporters of tropical hardwood timber, constituting 65% of the total Malaysian log exports in 2000. The last United Nations statistics in 2001 estimated Sarawak's sawlog exports at an average of 14,109,000 m^{3} (498,300,000 cu ft) per year between 1996 and 2000.

In 1955, OCBC became the first foreign bank to operate in Sarawak, with other overseas banks following suit. Other notable Sarawak-based companies include Cahya Mata Sarawak Berhad, Naim Holdings, and Rimbunan Hijau.

=== Energy ===
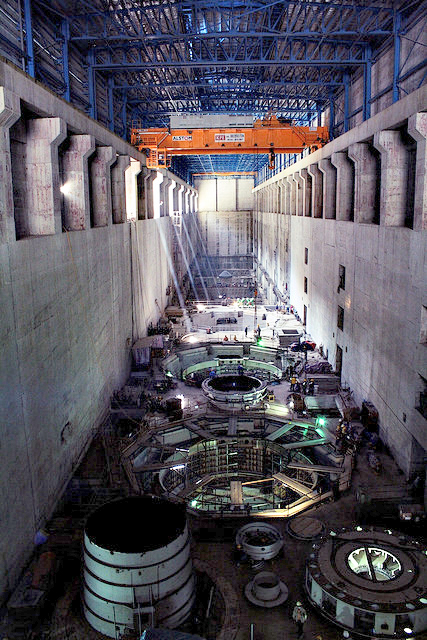
Turbines inside the Bakun Dam power house. The dam is the main source for electric energy in Sarawak.

Electricity in Sarawak, supplied by the state-owned Sarawak Energy Berhad (SEB), is primarily sourced from traditional coal fired power plants and thermal power stations using LNG, but diesel based sources and hydroelectricity are also utilised. There are 3 hydroelectric dams as of 2015 at Batang Ai, Bakun, and Murum, with several others under construction. In early 2016, SEB signed Malaysia's first energy export deal to supply electricity to neighbouring West Kalimantan in Indonesia.

In 2008, SCORE was established as a framework to develop the energy sector in the state, specifically the Murum, Baram, and Baleh Dams as well as potential coal-based power plants, and 10 high priority industries out to 2030. The Regional Corridor Development Authority is the government agency responsible for managing SCORE. The entire central region of Sarawak is covered under SCORE, including areas such as Samalaju (near Bintulu), Tanjung Manis, and Mukah. Samalaju will be developed as an industrial park, with Tanjung Manis as a halal food hub, and Mukah as the administrative centre for SCORE with a focus on resource-based research and development.

=== Tourism ===
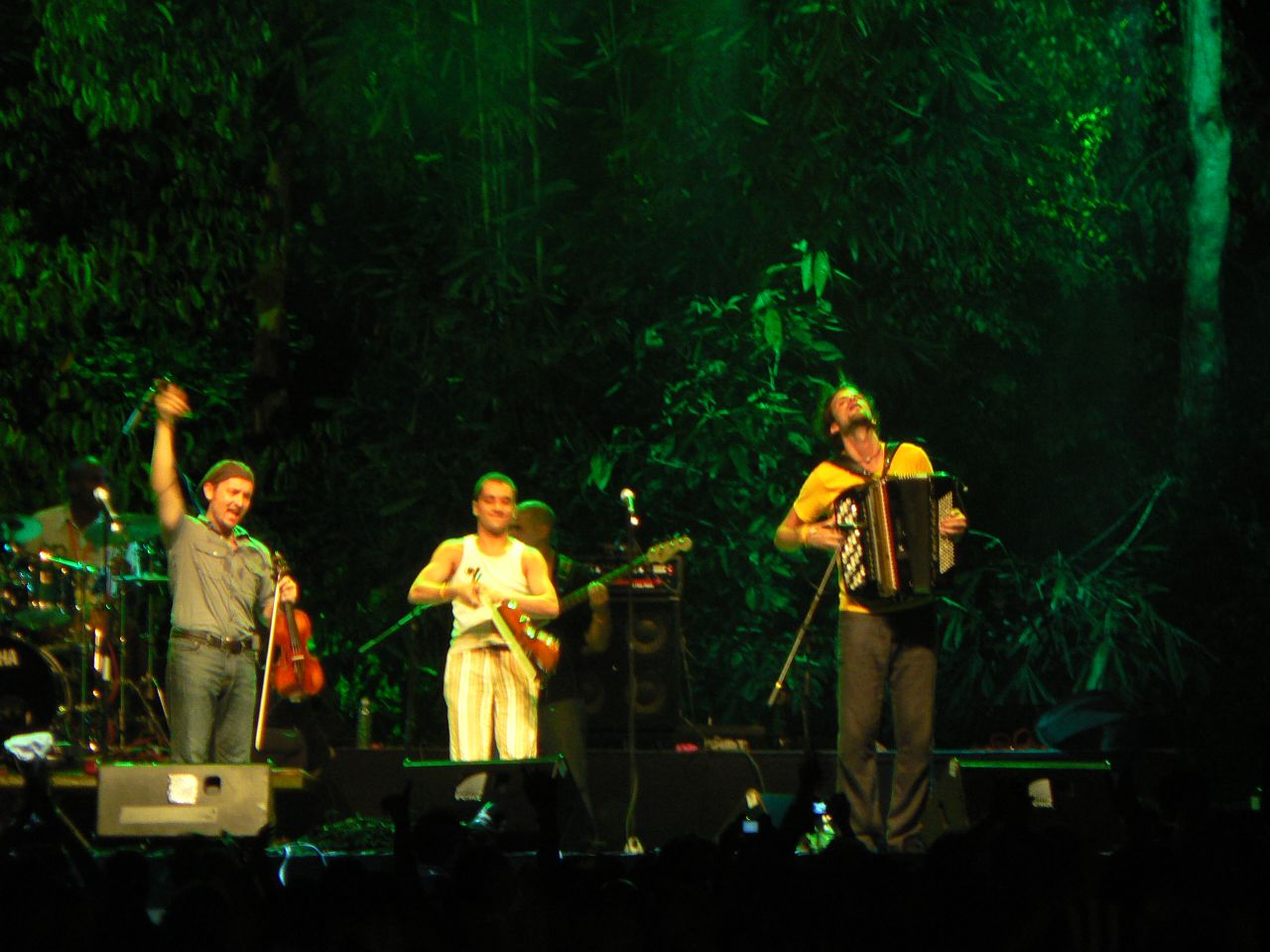
French Romani Manouche band performing during Rainforest World Music Festival 2006

Tourism plays a major role in the economy of Sarawak and contributed 7.9% of the state's GDP in 2016. Foreign visitors to Sarawak are predominantly from Brunei, Indonesia, the Philippines, Singapore, Hong Kong, Taiwan, Germany, Australia, Belgium, South Korea, and United Kingdom. A number of different organisations, both state and private, are involved in the promotion of tourism in Sarawak: the Sarawak Tourism Board is the state body responsible for tourism promotion in the state, various private tourism groups are united under the Sarawak Tourism Federation, and the Sarawak Convention Bureau is responsible for attracting conventions, conferences, and corporate events which are held in the Borneo Convention Centre in Kuching. The public and private bodies in Sarawak hold a biannual event to award the Sarawak Hornbill Tourism Award, an award for achievements within various categories, to recognise businesses and individuals for their efforts in the development of tourism within the state.

The Rainforest World Music Festival is the region's primary musical event, attracting more than 50,000 people annually. Other events that are held regularly in Sarawak are the Anugerah Seri Angkasa (ASA), ASEAN International Film Festival, Borneo Music Festival Live, Borneo Jazz Festival, Borneo Cultural Festival, and Borneo International Kite Festival. Major shopping complexes in Sarawak include The Spring, Boulevard, VivaCity, Plaza Merdeka, City One, and AEON shopping malls in Kuching, Bintang Megamall, Boulevard, Imperial Mall, and Miri Plaza shopping malls in Miri and NAIM Bintulu Paragon Street Mall, The Spring, Boulevard Shopping Mall, Crown Pacific Mall, Commerce Square Mall, Times Square Megamall, and Parkcity Mall in Bintulu. Initiatives have also focused on strengthening tourism development in Miri, with efforts to enhance existing attractions and promote experiential tourism activities such as interactive cultural experiences.

Sarawak tourist arrival statistics
| Key tourism indicators | 2010 | 2011 | 2012 | 2013 | 2014 | 2015 | 2016 | 2017 | 2018 | 2019 |
|---|---|---|---|---|---|---|---|---|---|---|
| Foreign arrivals (millions) | 1.897 | 2.343 | 2.635 | 2.665 | 2.996 | 2.497 | 2.258 | 2.639 | 2.113 | 2.082 |
| Domestic arrivals (West Malaysia and Sabah) (millions) | 1.373 | 1.452 | 1.434 | 1.707 | 1.862 | 2.020 | 2.402 | 2.217 | 2.318 | 2.560 |
| Total arrivals (millions) | 3.271 | 3.795 | 4.069 | 4.372 | 4.858 | 4.517 | 4.661 | 4.856 | 4.431 | 4.662 |
| Total tourism receipts, billions (RM) | 6.618 | 7.914 | 8.573 | 9.588 | 10.686 | 9.870 | 8.370 | 8.590 | 7.960 | N/A |
| Total tourism receipts, billions (equivalent USD) | 1.489 | 2.374 | 2.786 | 2.876 | 3.206 | N/A | N/A | N/A | N/A | N/A |

== Infrastructure ==
Infrastructure development in Sarawak is overseen by the Ministry of Infrastructure Development and Transportation, successor to the Ministry of Infrastructure Development and Communications (MIDCom) after it was renamed in 2016. Despite this ministerial oversight, infrastructure in Sarawak remains relatively underdeveloped compared to Peninsular Malaysia.

In 2009, 94% of urban Sarawak was supplied with electricity, but only 67% of rural areas had electricity. However, this had increased to 91% by 2014. According to a 2015 article, household internet penetration in Sarawak was lower than Malaysian national average, 41.2% versus 58.6%, with 58.5% of internet use being in urban areas and 29.9% in rural areas. In comparison, mobile telecommunication uptake in Sarawak was comparable to the national average, 93.3% against a national average of 94.2%, and on par with neighbouring Sabah. Mobile telecommunication infrastructure, specifically broadcast towers, are built and managed by Sacofa Sdn Bhd (Sacofa Private Limited), which enjoys a monopoly in Sarawak after the company was granted a 20-year exclusivity deal on the provision, maintenance and leasing of towers in the state.

A number of different bodies manage the supply of water depending on their region of responsibility, including the Kuching Water Board (KWB) which manages Kuching water supply, Sibu Water Board (SWB) which manages Sibu water supply, LAKU Management Sdn Bhd, which handle water supply in Miri, Bintulu, and Limbang and the Rural Water Supply Department managing the water supply for the remaining areas. As of 2014, 82% of the rural areas have a fresh water supply.

=== Broadcasting ===
Sarawak launched its radio service on 7 June 1954, which became a part of Radio Malaysia when it joined Malaysia in 1963 and later part of the bigger Radio Televisyen Malaysia (RTM) in 1969 when the nation's radio and television operations merged. It did not have television service until 30 August 1975, when RTM TV1 was made available for East Malaysian viewers. RTM has six branches in the state - a main office in capital city Kuching and five other offices in Simanggang, Sibu, Bintulu, Miri and Limbang. The main office produces news and shows for RTM's television channels and operates four state radio channels, namely Sarawak FM, Red FM and Wai FM Iban and Bidayuh networks, whereas five other offices operate district radio channels such as Sri Aman FM, Sibu FM, Bintulu FM, Miri FM and Limbang FM. On 7 April 1998, NTV7 was launched by Sarawakian businessman Mohd Effendi Norwawi under the ownership of Natseven TV Sdn Bhd. Before its acquisition by Media Prima Berhad in 2005, it had a studio in the state capital. However, Sarawak didn't have its own true TV station until 10 October 2020, when it launched TVS, thus becoming the first region in Malaysia to own its TV station. It is currently available in Astro, Astro NJOI and myFreeview (MYTV Broadcasting) and available in 4 languages: Malay, English, Iban and Chinese (Mandarin). Commercial radio channels based in the state include Cats FM and TEA FM, respectively launched on 8 August 1996 and 1 August 2015.

=== Transportation ===
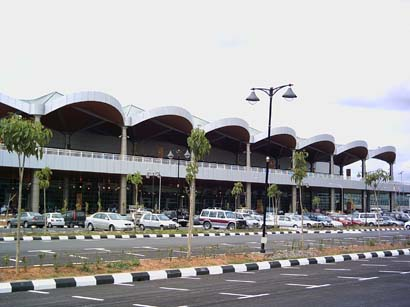
Kuching International Airport terminal

Much like many former British territories, Sarawak uses a dual carriageway with the left-hand traffic rule. As of 2013, Sarawak had a total of 32,091 km (19,940 mi) of connected roadways, with 18,003 km (11,187 mi) being paved state routes, 8,313 km (5,165 mi) of dirt tracks, 4,352 km (2,704 mi) of gravel roads, and 1,424 km (885 mi) of paved federal highway. The primary route in Sarawak is the Pan Borneo Highway, which runs from Sematan, Sarawak, through Brunei to Tawau, Sabah. Despite being a major highway, the condition of the road was poor leading to numerous accidents and fatalities. 16 billion ringgit worth of contracts were awarded to a number of local companies in December 2016 to add new vehicle and pedestrian bridges, interchanges and bus shelters to the highway as part of a multi-phase project. However since 2025, the highway is nearing completion with a majority of the stretch being fully usable, cutting down travel time significantly.

A railway line existed before World War II, but the last remnants of the line were dismantled in 1959. A rail project was announced in 2008 to be in line with the transport needs of SCORE, but as yet no construction work has begun despite an anticipated completion date in 2015. In 2017, the Sarawak government proposed a light rail system connecting Kuching, Samarahan and Serian divisions which eventually culminated into an autonomous rail rapid transit system (Kuching Urban Transportation System) with anticipated completion in 2028 for Phase 1. There are also proposals to introduce a similar system to Bintulu in the future. Currently, buses are the primary mode of public transportation in Sarawak with interstate services connecting the state to Sabah, Brunei, and Pontianak (Indonesia).

Sarawak is served by a number of airports with Kuching International Airport, located south west of Kuching, being the largest. Flights from Kuching are mainly to Kuala Lumpur but also to Johor Bahru, Penang, Sabah, Kelantan, Singapore and Pontianak, Indonesia. A second airport at Miri serves flights primarily to other Malaysian states as well as services to Singapore. Other smaller airports such as Sibu Airport, Bintulu Airport, Mukah Airport, Marudi Airport, Mulu Airport, and Limbang Airport provide domestic services within Malaysia. There are also a number of remote airstrips serving rural communities in the state. Three airlines serve flights in Sarawak, Malaysia Airlines, Air Asia, and AirBorneo all of which use Kuching Airport as their main hub. The state owned Hornbill Skyways is an aviation company that largely provides private chartered flights and flight services for public servants.

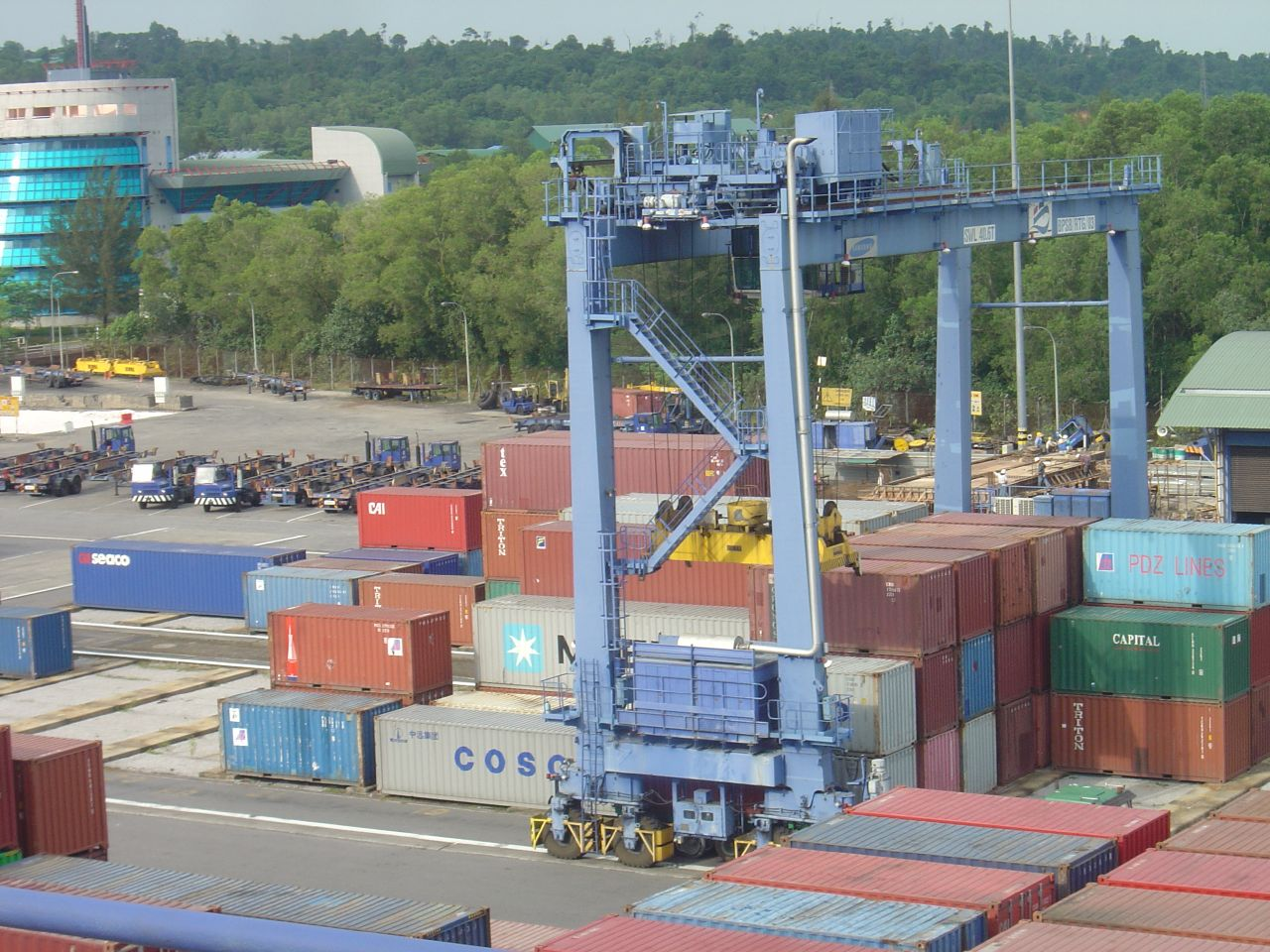
Bintulu International Container Terminal (BICT) at Bintulu seaport

Sarawak has four primary ports located at Kuching, Sibu, Bintulu, and Miri. The busiest seaport at Bintulu is under the jurisdiction of the Malaysian federal government and mainly handles LNG products and regular cargo. The remaining ports are under the respective state port authorities. The combined throughput of the four primary ports was 61.04 million freight weight tonnes (FWT) in 2013. Sarawak has 55 navigable river networks with a combined length of 3,300 km (2,100 mi). For centuries, the rivers of Sarawak have been a primary means of transport as well as a route for timber and other agricultural goods moving downriver for export at the country's major ports. Sibu port, located 113 km (70 mi) from the river's mouth, is the main hub along the Rajang River mainly handling timber products. However, the throughput of Sibu port has declined over the years after Tanjung Manis Industrial Port (TIMP) began operating further downriver.

=== Healthcare ===
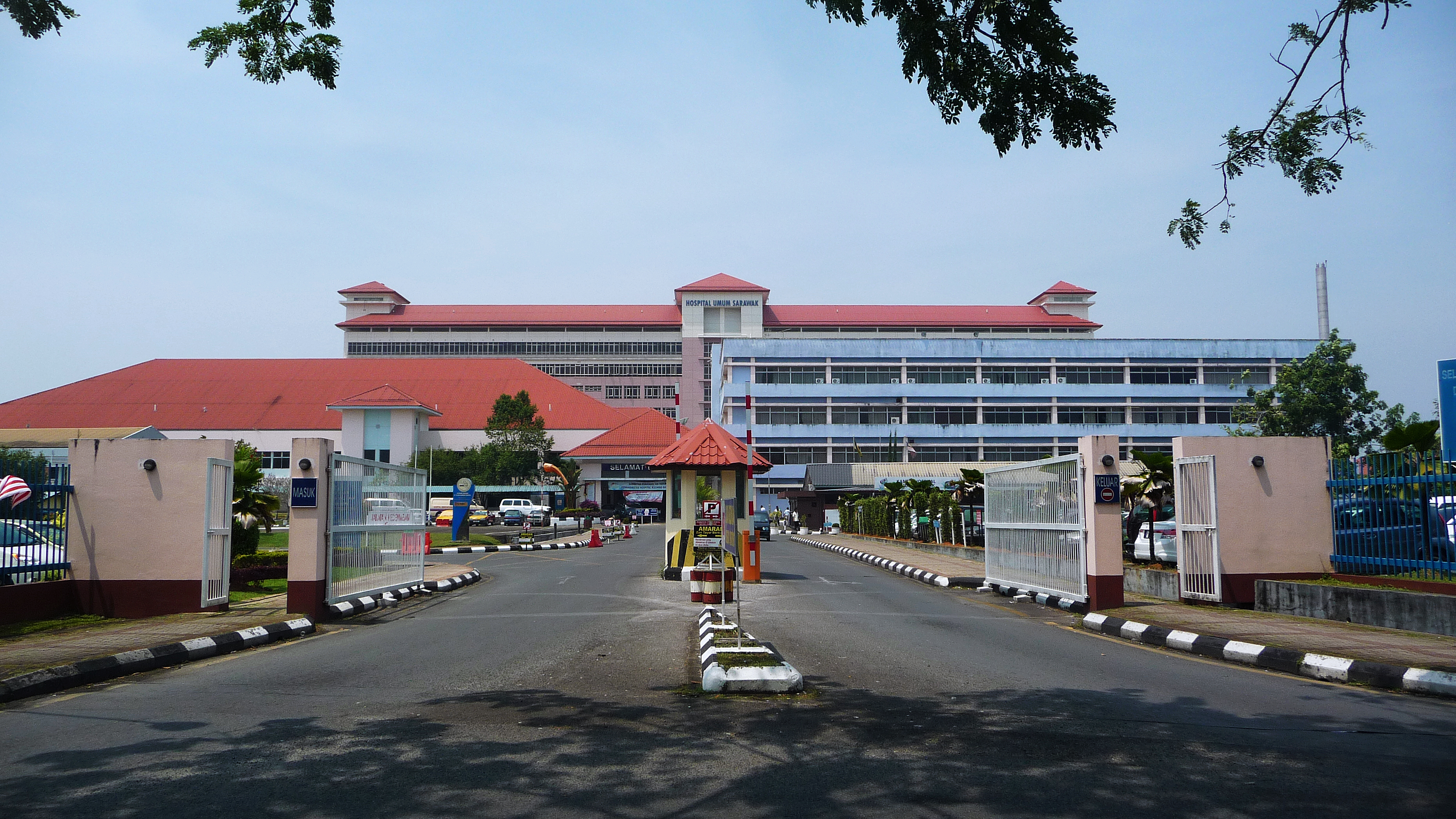
The Sarawak General Hospital

Health care in provided by three major government hospitals, Sarawak General Hospital, Sibu Hospital, and Miri Hospital, as well as numerous district hospitals, public health clinics, community clinics, and rural clinics. Sarawak Heart Centre was set up in 2011 in Kota Samarahan to provide cardiology services to patients. Besides government-owned hospitals and clinics, there are several private hospitals in Sarawak such as the Normah Medical Specialists Centre, Timberland Medical Specialists Centre, and Sibu Specialist Medical Centre. Hospitals in Sarawak typically provide the full gamut of health care options, from triage to palliative care for the terminally ill. In 1994, Sarawak General Hospital Department of Radiotherapy, Oncology & Palliative Care instituted an at-home care, or hospice care, program for cancer patients. The non profit Sarawak Hospice Society was established in 1998 to promote this program. In comparison to the number of other medical facilities, mental health is only serviced by a single facility, Hospital Sentosa. This abundance of medical services has made Sarawak a medical tourism destination for visitors from neighbouring Brunei and Indonesia.

In comparison to the prevalence of health services in urban regions, much of rural Sarawak is only accessible by river transport, which limits access. Remote rural areas that are beyond the operating areas of health clinics, about 12 km (7.5 mi), and inaccessible by land or river are serviced by a monthly flying doctor service, which was established in 1973. A village health promoter program, where volunteers are provided with basic medical training, was established in 1981 but difficulty in providing medical supplies to remote villages, as well as a lack of incentive, resulted in a decline of the program. A variety of traditional medicine practices are still being used by the various communities in Sarawak to supplement modern medical practices but this practice is also declining. However, since 2004, there has been a resurgence in traditional medicine in Malaysia resulting in the establishment of a traditional medicine division within the Ministry of Health. A 2006 government program to have integrated hospitals led to numerous universities starting programs to teach traditional medicine and major hospitals, including Sarawak General Hospital, providing traditional therapies.

=== Education ===
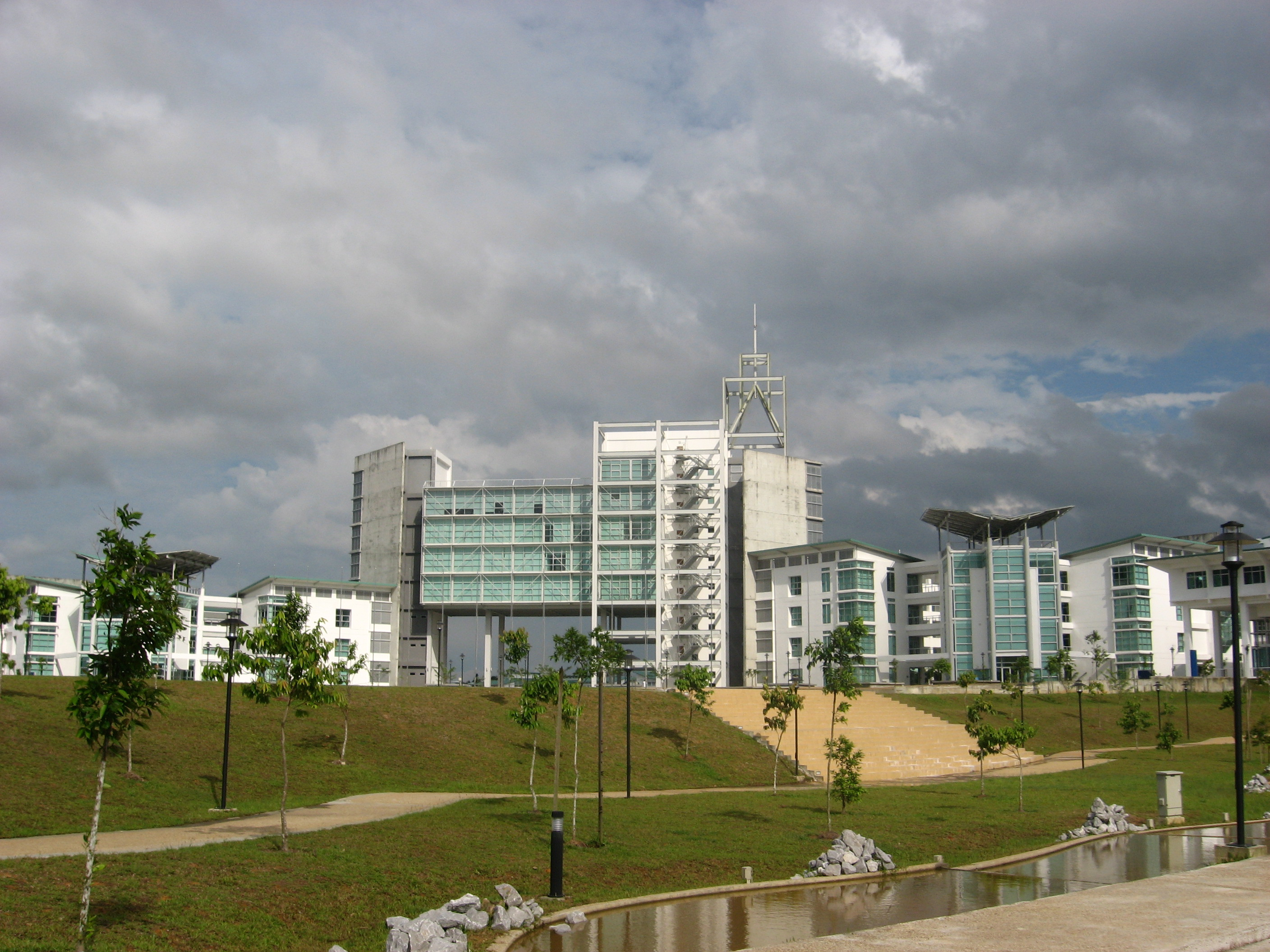
Universiti Malaysia Sarawak (UNIMAS) chancellory building

Education in Malaysia falls under the remit of two federal ministries; the Malaysian Ministry of Education is responsible for primary and secondary education, while the Ministry of Higher Education has oversight over public universities, polytechnic and community colleges. Early childhood education is not directly controlled by the Ministry of Education as it does with primary and secondary education. However, the ministry does oversee the licensing of private kindergartens, the main form of early childhood education, in accordance with the National Pre-School Quality Standard, which was launched in 2013.

Around the time of Federation, overall literacy in Sarawak was quite low. In 1960, the overall literacy rate was 25%, with a heavy slant in the literacy rate towards the Chinese population, 53%, compared with that of indigenous peoples which was substantially lower, only 17%. By 2007, overall literacy in adults aged 15 and over had significantly increased to 92.3% and in 2012, this had climbed to 96%.

There were 1480 schools in Sarawak in 2014, of which 1271 were primary, 202 were secondary and 7 were vocational/technical secondary schools. Among these are a number of schools that date from the Brooke era, including St. Thomas's School Kuching (1848), St Mary's School Kuching (1848), and St Joseph's School Kuching (1882). As well as government schools, there are four international schools: Tunku Putra School, a primary and secondary school offering national and Cambridge curricula, Lodge International School, which is also open to local students and uses both the British National and Cambridge systems, Kidurong International School, which is owned by Shell and offers primary education mainly to children of employees but local children may enter depending on space availability, and Tenby International School, which opened in 2014 and is open to both local and expatriate children. There are also 14 Chinese independent secondary schools in Sarawak that teach in Chinese rather than English or Malay. Previously, only Chinese students were enrolled in these schools, but mobility of the workforce has led to increasing turnover of students as parents move to other areas for employment. This has led to an increasing number of Bumiputera students being enrolled in Chinese primary and preschools.

Sarawak is home to three public universities – Universiti Malaysia Sarawak, Universiti Teknologi Mara at Kota Samarahan, and Universiti Putra Malaysia – as well as the private Curtin University, Malaysia and Swinburne University of Technology Sarawak Campus. The latter two are satellite campuses of Curtin University in Perth and Swinburne University of Technology in Melbourne, Australia.

With the establishment of SCORE and the associated potential of 1.6 million more jobs by 2030, the state government allocated RM1 billion from 2016 to 2020 to a Skills Development Fund for vocational education. In 2015, Petronas provided vocational scholarships to 150 underprivileged Sarawak students as part of its Vocational Institution Sponsorship and Training Assistance program, although it had been criticised for under-representing local students in its previous allocations; the company also provided support to other Sarawak vocational education centres.

== Demographics ==
Ethnic groups in Sarawak (2021)
| Ethnic | Percent |
| Bumiputera | 72.1% |
| Chinese | 22.6% |
| Indian | 0.2% |
| Others | 0.3% |
| Non-citizens | 4.8% |

Sub-ethnic groups of Dayak in Sarawak (2021)
1. Iban (70.5%)
2. Bidayuh (19.2%)
3. Orang Ulu (10.3%)

The 2020 census of Malaysia reported a population of 2,453,677 in Sarawak, making it the fifth most populous state. However, this population is distributed over a large area resulting in Sarawak having the lowest population density in the country with only 20 people per km^{2}. The average population growth rate of 1.8%, from 2000 to 2010, is very close to the national average of 2.0%. In 2014, 58% of the population resided in urban areas with the remainder in rural areas, but over the next 10 years it is predicted that the urban population would rise to 65%. As of 2011, the crude birth rate in Sarawak was 16.3 per 1000 individuals, the crude death rate was 4.3 per 1000 population, and the infant mortality rate was 6.5 per 1000 live births.

Urban populations consist predominantly of Malays, Melanaus, Chinese, and a small population of urban Ibans and Bidayuhs who migrated from their home villages seeking employment. The latter two are among the more than 40 sub-ethnic groups of Sarawak, many of whom still inhabit remote areas and are referred to as Orang Asal. The Orang Asal, and Malays, of Peninsular Malaysia, Sarawak and Sabah are referred to collectively as Bumiputera (son of the soil). This classification grants them special privileges in education, jobs, finance, and political positions.

The registration for, and issuing of, national identity cards, a legally required document for accessing various services, to these remote tribes has been problematic for many years, and in the past had even resulted in a large number of people from the Penan ethnic group being rendered effectively stateless. In recent years, this issue has seen progressive improvement with the implementation of systems such as mobile registration units.

Sarawak has a large immigrant work force with as many as 150,000 registered foreign migrant workers working as domestic workers or in plantation, manufacturing, construction, services and agriculture. However, this population of legally registered workers is overshadowed by a large population of between 320,000 and 350,000 illegal workers.

=== Ethnic groups ===
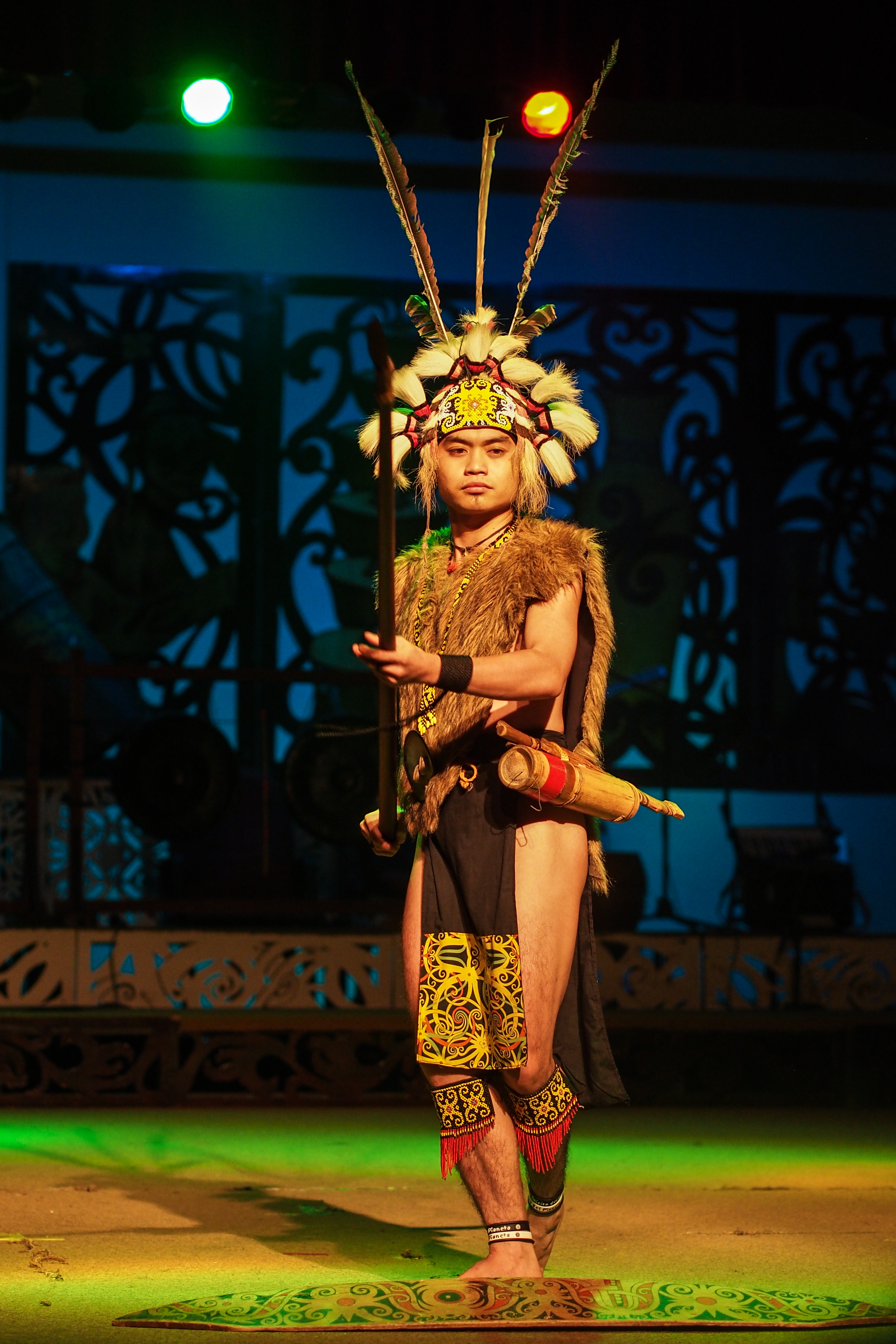
an Iban warrior in his traditional dress

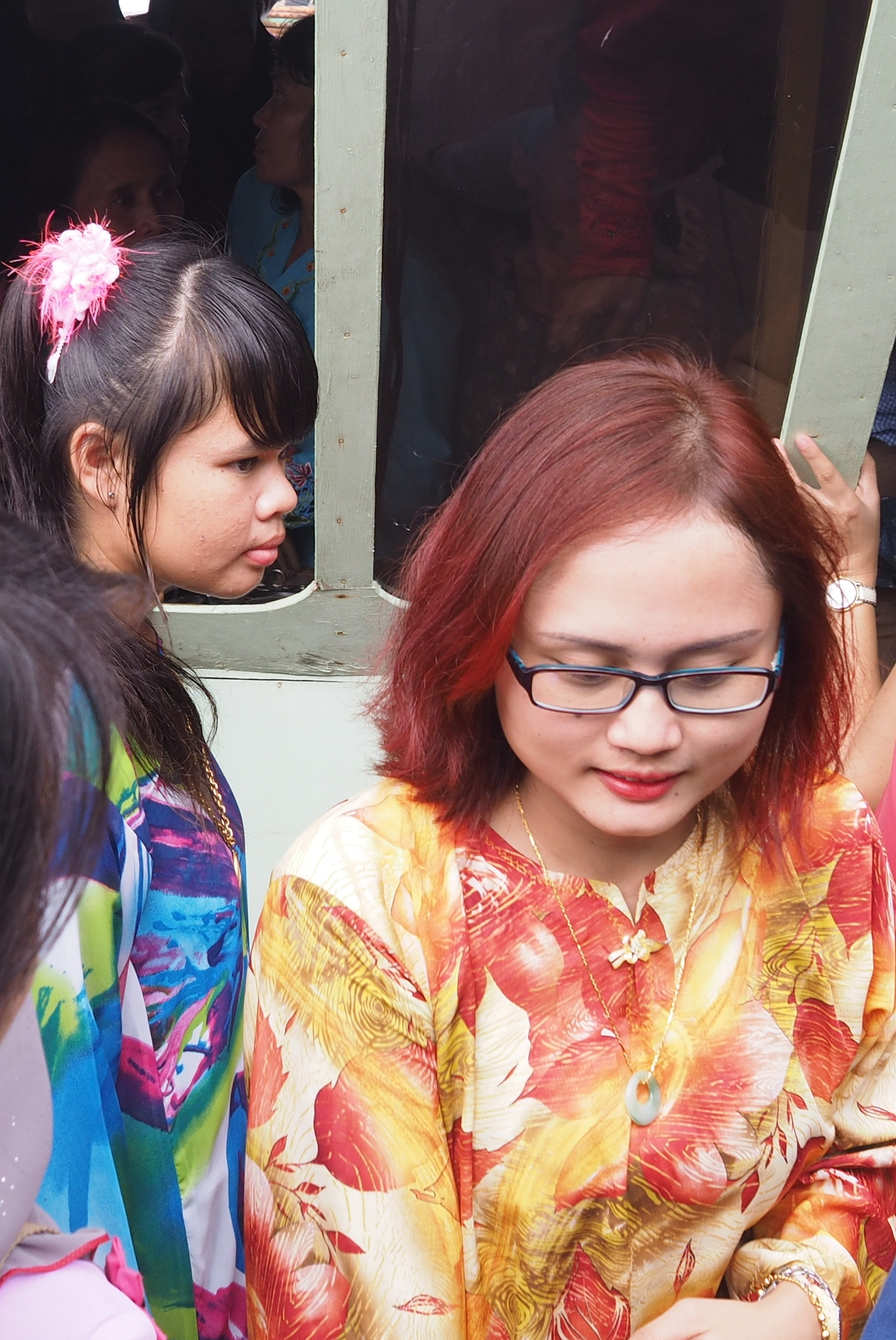
Melanau girls with the traditional Baju Kurung

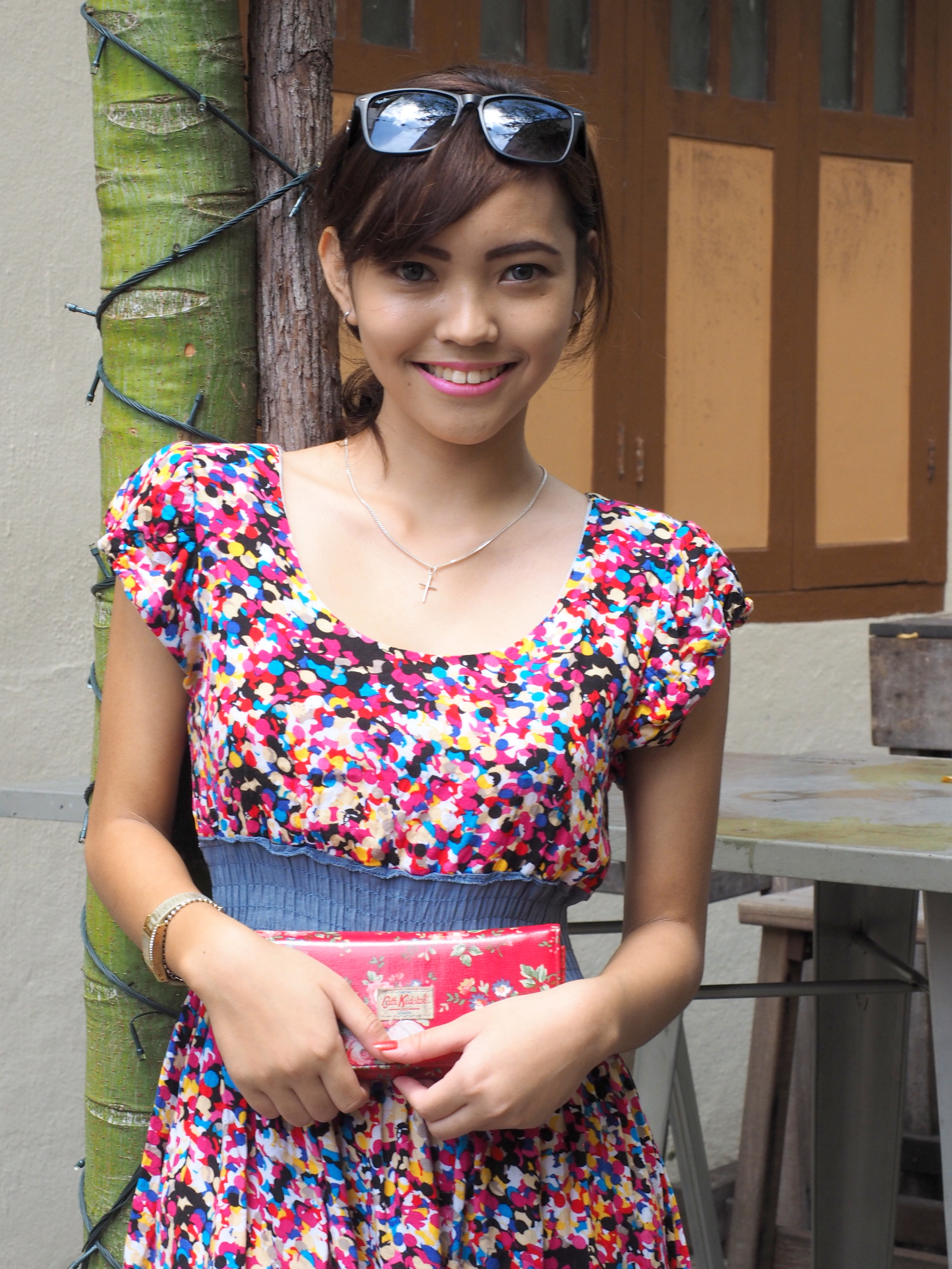
a Bidayuh girl

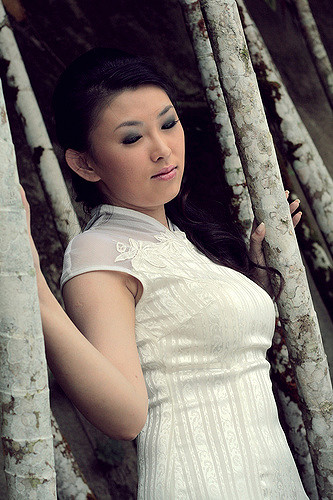
Sarawakian Chinese woman in her traditional dress of Cheongsam

Sarawak has six major ethnic groups, Iban, Chinese, Malay, Bidayuh, Melanau, and Orang Ulu, as well as a number of ethnic groups with smaller but still substantial populations, such as the Kedayan, Javanese, Bugis, Murut, and Indian. In 2015, the Bidayuh and Iban, both indigenous ethnic groups of Sarawak, were officially recognised by the government of Malaysia as comprising the Dayak people. There are more than 50 tribes still existing or extinct in Sarawak but only the major tribes are listed in the Malaysian Federal Constitution.

The population of 1,389,926 of the Iban people in Sarawak, based on 2022 statistics, makes it the largest ethnic group in the state. The Iban were, in the past, a society that paid particular attention to social status, especially to those who displayed martial prowess as well as to those who demonstrated expertise in various fields such as farming and oratory. Specific terms were used to refer to those who belonged to particular social strata, such as the raja berani (rich and the brave), orang mayuh (ordinary people), and ulun (slaves). Despite modern influences, Iban still observe many of their traditional rituals such as Gawai Antu (festival of the dead) and Gawai Dayak (Harvest Festival).

Although the presence of Chinese in Sarawak dates back to the 6th century AD when traders first came to the state, the Chinese population today largely consists of communities originating from immigrants during the Brooke era. This migration was driven by the employment opportunities at gold mines in Bau. Sarawak Chinese are primarily Buddhist and Christian, and speak a multitude of southern Chinese languages: Cantonese, Fuzhou, Hakka, Hokkien, Teochew, and Henghua (Putian people), in addition to Mandarin. They celebrate major cultural festivals such as Hungry Ghost Festival and the Chinese New Year much as their ancestors did. Chinese settlers in Sarawak were not limited to any one area. Those who settled in Kuching did so near the Sarawak River in an area that is now referred to as Chinatown. Fuzhounese immigrants from Fuzhou, Fujian, led by Wong Nai Siong in 1901, settled along the Rajang River in what is now Sibu, as due to Boxer Rebellion, while those who arrived in Miri sought work in the coal mines and oilfields.

During the Brooke era, Sarawak Malays were predominantly fishermen, leading to their villages being concentrated along river banks. However, with the advent of urban development, many Malays have migrated to seek employment in public and private sectors. Traditionally, they are known for their silver and brass crafts, wood carvings, and textiles.

The Melanau are a native people of Sarawak that lived in areas primarily around the modern city of Mukah, where they worked as fishermen and craftsmen as well renowned boatbuilders. Historically the Melanau practised Animism, a belief that spirits inhabited objects in their environment, and while this is still practised today, most Melanau have since been converted to Christianity and Islam. (Note: Ishikawa, 2010 (page 169))

The Bidayuh are a southern Sarawak people, that were referred to by early European settlers as Land Dayaks because they traditionally live on steep limestone mountains. They account for 7.3 per cent of the population of Sarawak and are the second most numerous of the indigenous Dayak people, after the Iban. The Bidayuh are indigenous to the areas that comprise the modern day divisions of Kuching and Serian. Their language comprises five major dialects: Biatah (Padawan, Penrissen and Kuching areas), Bau, formerly known as Jagoi or Bau-Jagoi (Bau district), Serian, formerly called Bukar-Sadong (Serian district), and Salako and Rara (Lundu district). All these dialects are not mutually intelligible due to insufficient lexicostatistical overlap between them for developing one standard Bidayuh with a unified orthography. Since there is no common standardised Bidayuh language, the sociolinguistic norms of the younger generation of Bidayuhs today are influenced by Malaysian language, with both English and Sarawak Malay also being the lingua franca. Like many other indigenous peoples, the majority of the Bidayuh have been converted to Christianity, but still live in villages consisting of longhouses, with the addition of the distinctive round baruk where communal gatherings were held.

The numerous tribes who reside in Sarawak's interior such as the Kenyah, Kayan, Lun Bawang, Kelabit, Penan, Bisaya, and Berawan are collectively referred to as Orang Ulu. In the Iban language, this name means "Upriver People", reflecting the location these tribes settled in; most of them reside near the drainage basin of the Baram River. Both woodworking and artistry are highly visible aspects of Orang Ulu culture exemplified by mural covered longhouses, carved wooden boats, and tattooing. Well-known musical instruments from the Orang Ulu are the Kayans' sapeh and Kenyah's sampe' and Lun Bawang's bamboo band. The Kelabit and Lun Bawang people are known for their production of fragrant rice. As with the many other indigenous peoples of Sarawak, the majority of Orang Ulu are Christians.

The Indians, predominantly the Tamils were brought by the British Government to work in estates as labourers and clerks. Besides, the Malayalee community too exist in the cities in Sarawak. Today, many among the Indians are known to be employed as professionals (mainly doctors) in Sarawak.

=== Languages ===
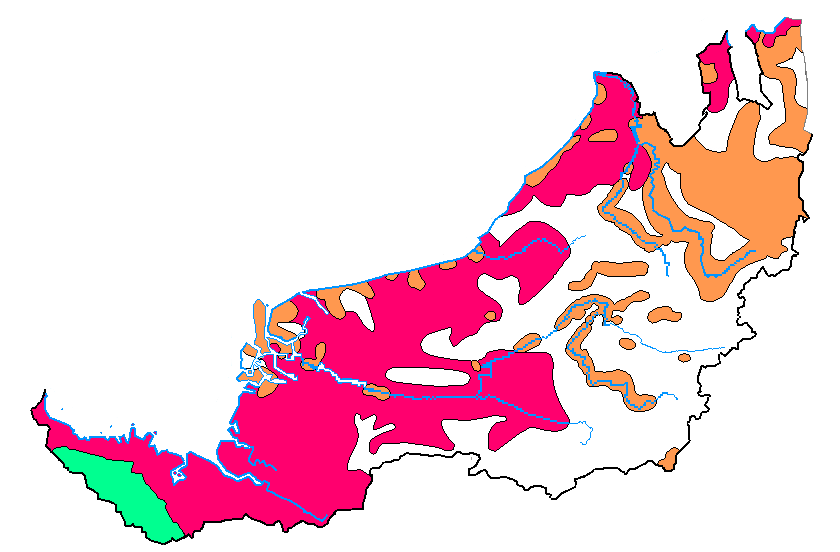
The distribution of language families of Sarawak shown by colours: (click image to enlarge) Malayic North Borneo and Melanau Kajang languages Land Dayak Areas with multiple languages

English was the official language of Sarawak from 1963 to 1974 due to opposition from First Chief Minister of Sarawak Stephen Kalong Ningkan to the use of the Malaysian language in Sarawak. In 1974, the new Chief Minister Abdul Rahman Ya'kub recognised Malay alongside English as an official language of Sarawak. (Note: Faisal, 2012 ... to make Bahasa Malaysia and English as negeri's official languages. (page 84)) This new status given to the Malay language was further reinforced by new education standards transitioning curriculum to Malay. In 1985 English lost the status of an official language, leaving only Malay. (Note: Postill, 2006 ... Malay was accepted as the official language of Sarawak alongside English until 1985, when English was finally dropped. (page 64)) Despite official policy, Sarawak opposition members argue that English remained the de facto official language of Sarawak. English is still spoken in the legal courts, and state legislative assembly. In 2015, Chief Minister Adenan Satem reinstated English as an official language. Sarawak's language autonomy does not extend to the educational system, with the language syllabus controlled by the federal government.

Although the official form of Malay, Bahasa Malaysia, is spoken by the government administration, it is used infrequently in colloquial conversation. The local dialect of Bahasa Sarawak (Sarawak Malay) dominates the vernacular. Bahasa Sarawak is the most common language of Sarawak Malays and other indigenous tribes. The Iban language, which has minor regional variations, is the most widely spoken native language, with 60 per cent of the Sarawak population speaking it as a first language. The Bidayuh language, with six major dialects, is spoken by 10 per cent of the population. The Orang Ulu have about 30 different language dialects. While the ethnic Chinese originate from a variety of backgrounds and speak many different Southern Chinese languages such as Cantonese, Hokkien, Hakka, Fuzhou, and Teochew, they also converse in Malaysian Mandarin. Tamil language is spoken by the Indians in Sarawak.

=== Religion ===
Religion in Sarawak (2020)
| Religion | Percent |
| Christianity | 50.1% |
| Islam | 34.2% |
| Buddhism | 12.8% |
| No religion | 1.2% |
| Others | 0.5% |

Christianity is the largest religion in Sarawak, representing 50.1% of the total population according to the 2020 census. This makes Sarawak the only Malaysian state with a Christian majority. The earliest Christian missionaries in Sarawak were Church of England (Anglicans) in 1848, followed by Roman Catholics a few years later, and Methodists in 1903. Evangelization first took place among the Chinese immigrants before spreading to indigenous animists. Other Christian denominations in Sarawak are Borneo Evangelical Mission (or Sidang Injil Borneo), and Baptists. Indigenous people such as the Iban, Bidayuh, and Orang Ulu have adopted Christianity, although they do retain some of their traditional religious rites. Many Muslims come from the Malay and Melanau. Buddhism, Taoism, and Chinese folk religion are predominantly practised by Chinese Malaysians. Other minor religions in Sarawak are the Baháʼí Faith, Hinduism, Sikhism, and animism.

Although Islam is the official religion of Malaysia, Sarawak has no official state religion. However, during the chieftainship of Abdul Rahman Ya'kub, the Constitution of Sarawak was amended to make the Yang di-Pertuan Agong the head of Islam in Sarawak and empower the state assembly to pass laws regarding Islamic affairs. With such provisions, Islamic policies can be formulated in Sarawak and the establishment of Islamic state agencies is possible. The 1978 Majlis Islam Bill enabled the setting up of Syariah Courts in Sarawak with jurisdictions over matrimonial, child custody, betrothal, inheritance, and criminal cases in the state. An appeals court and Courts of Kadi were also formed. (Note: Faisal, 2012. Negri is empowered to make provisions for regulating Islamic affairs... (page 86))

Religious sites in Sarawak

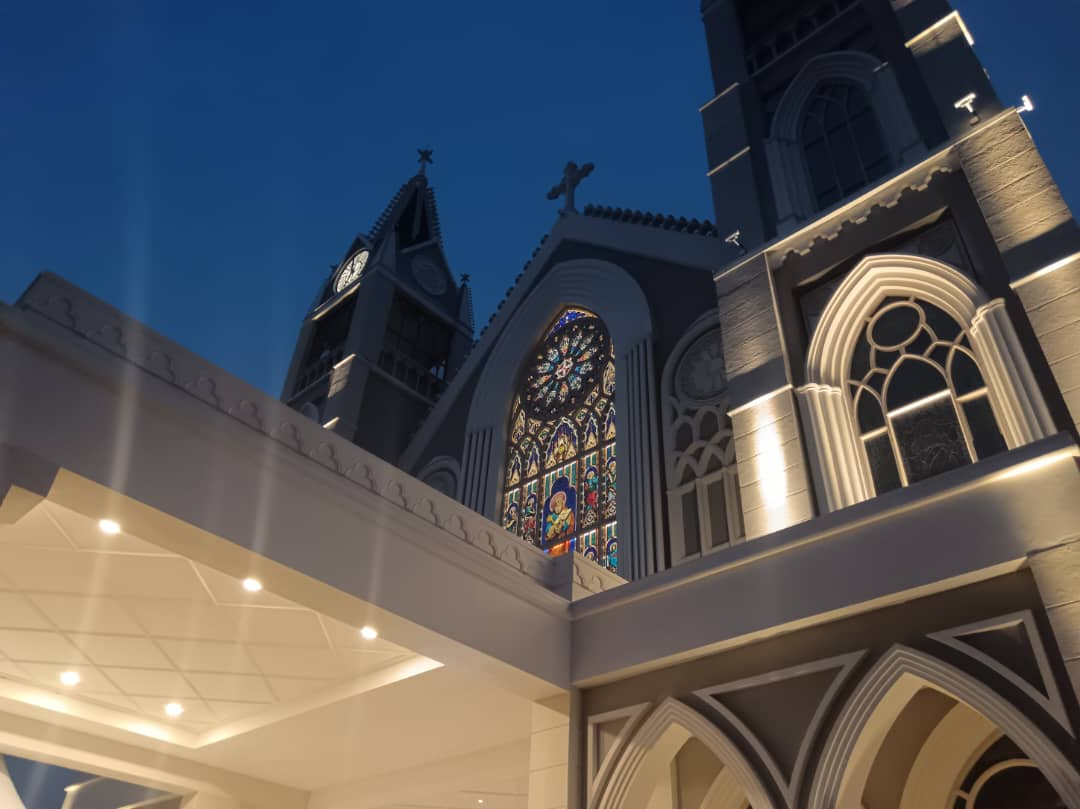
St. Peter's Church

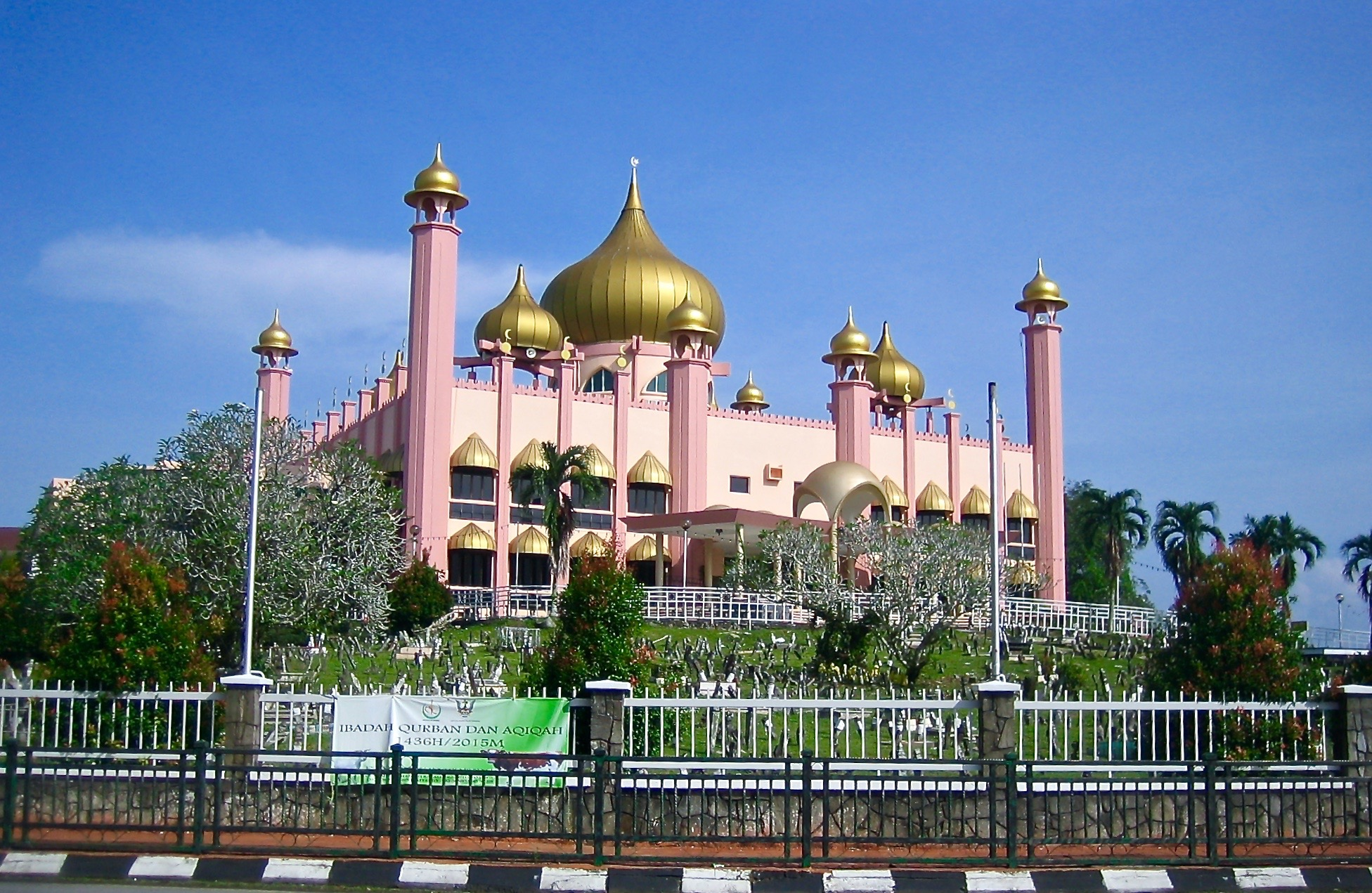
Old Sarawak State Mosque

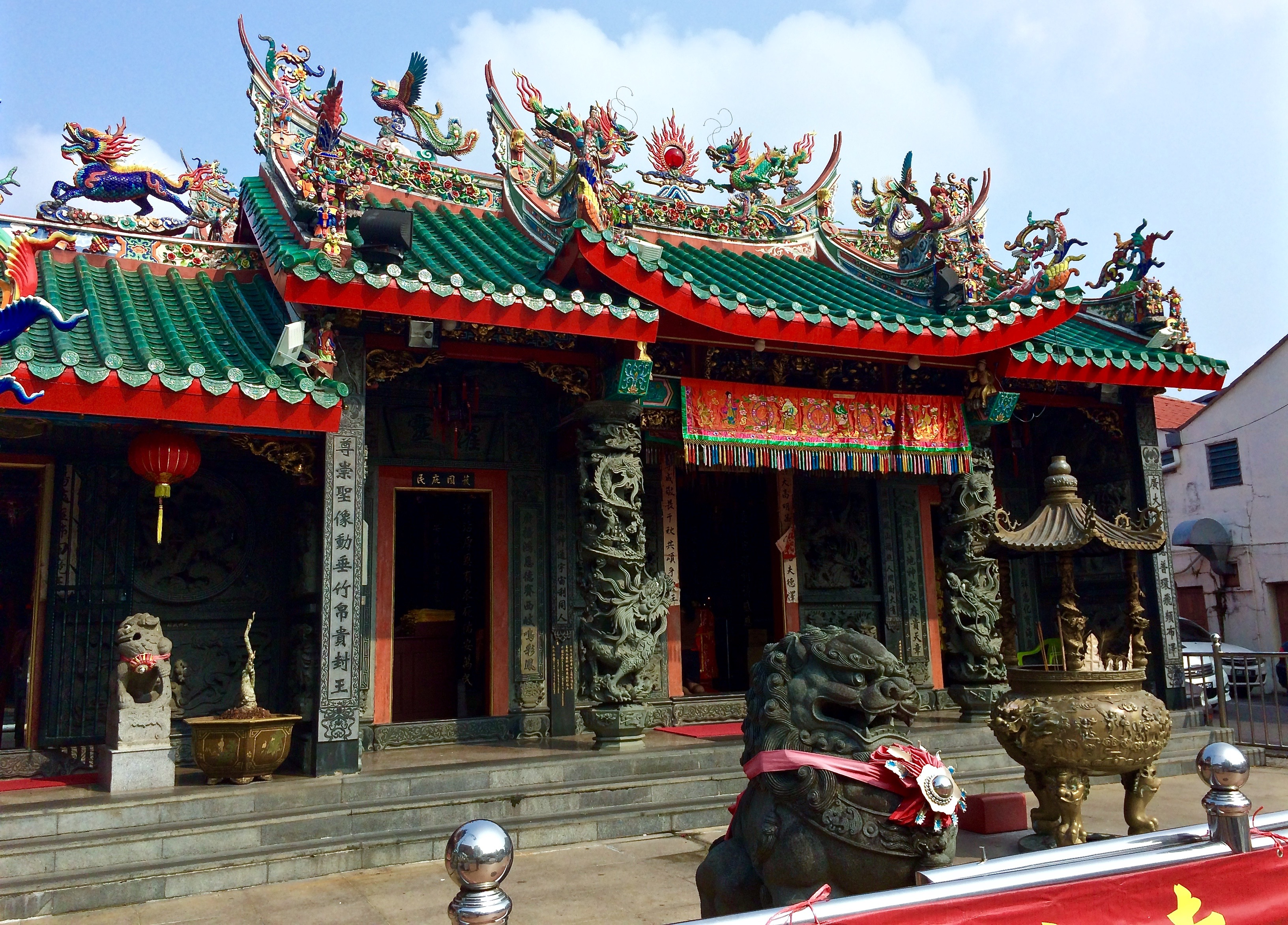
Hong San Si Temple

== Culture ==
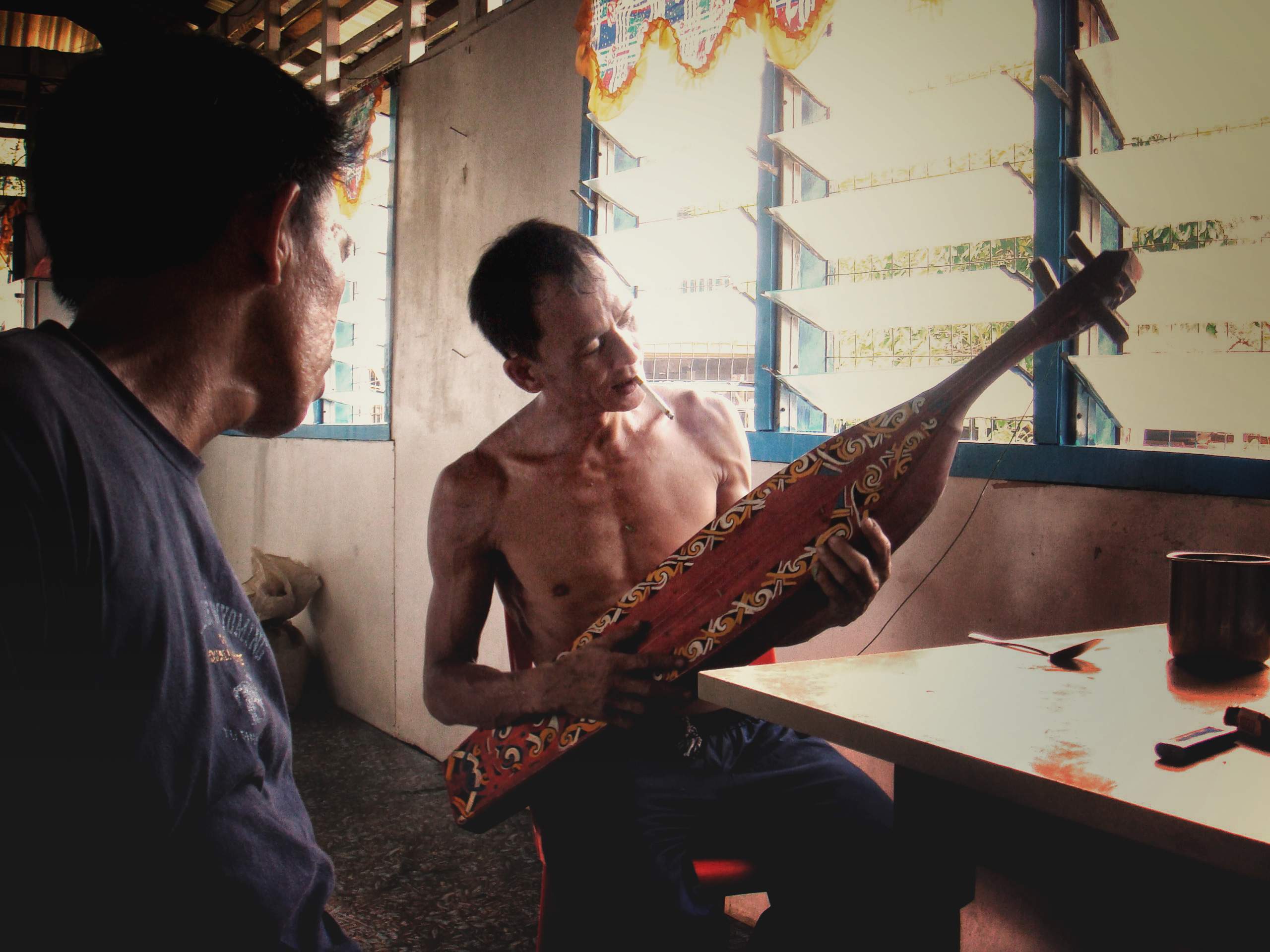
A Kayan tribesman, playing the sapé

The location and history of Sarawak has resulted in a broad diversity of ethnicity, culture and languages. Among the indigenous peoples of Sarawak, outside influences have led to many changes over time. The Iban tribal culture in Sarawak centred on the concept of the warrior and the ability to take heads from other tribes in battle. This practice, central as it was to the Iban people, was made illegal under James Brooke's rule and ultimately faded away although reminders of the practice are still seen in some long houses. Two other tribal peoples of the Sarawak Highlands, the Kelabit and Lun Bawang, have seen fundamental changes to their ethnic identities as a direct result of their conversion to Christianity. One major change was the shift in the focal point of their social interactions from the traditional long house to the local church. Their religious devotion has also helped shape their worldview outside of their village, particularly in response to change. For the Penan people, one of the last tribes to still be practising a nomadic lifestyle within the jungle, outside influence, particularly education, has resulted in a significant decline in the population that practice the nomadic lifestyle. Others settle down after intermixing with members of different tribes, such as the Orang Ulu. One direct result of this diversity in cultures, engendered by a policy of tolerance to all races, is the increasing numbers of tribal peoples marrying not only other Sarawakian tribes, but also to Chinese, Malays as well as citizens of European or American descent.

The indigenous tribes of Sarawak traditionally used oratory to pass on their culture from one generation to the next; (Note: Pandian, 2014. it became the primary means of passing culture, history, and valued traditions. ... in the fact that oral literature is actualised only in performances; (page 95)) examples of these traditional practices include the Iban's Ngajat dances, Renong (Iban vocal repertory), Ensera (Iban oral narratives), (Note: Postill, 2006. ... four were oral narratives ... (page 51)) and epic storytelling by the Kayan and Kenyah.

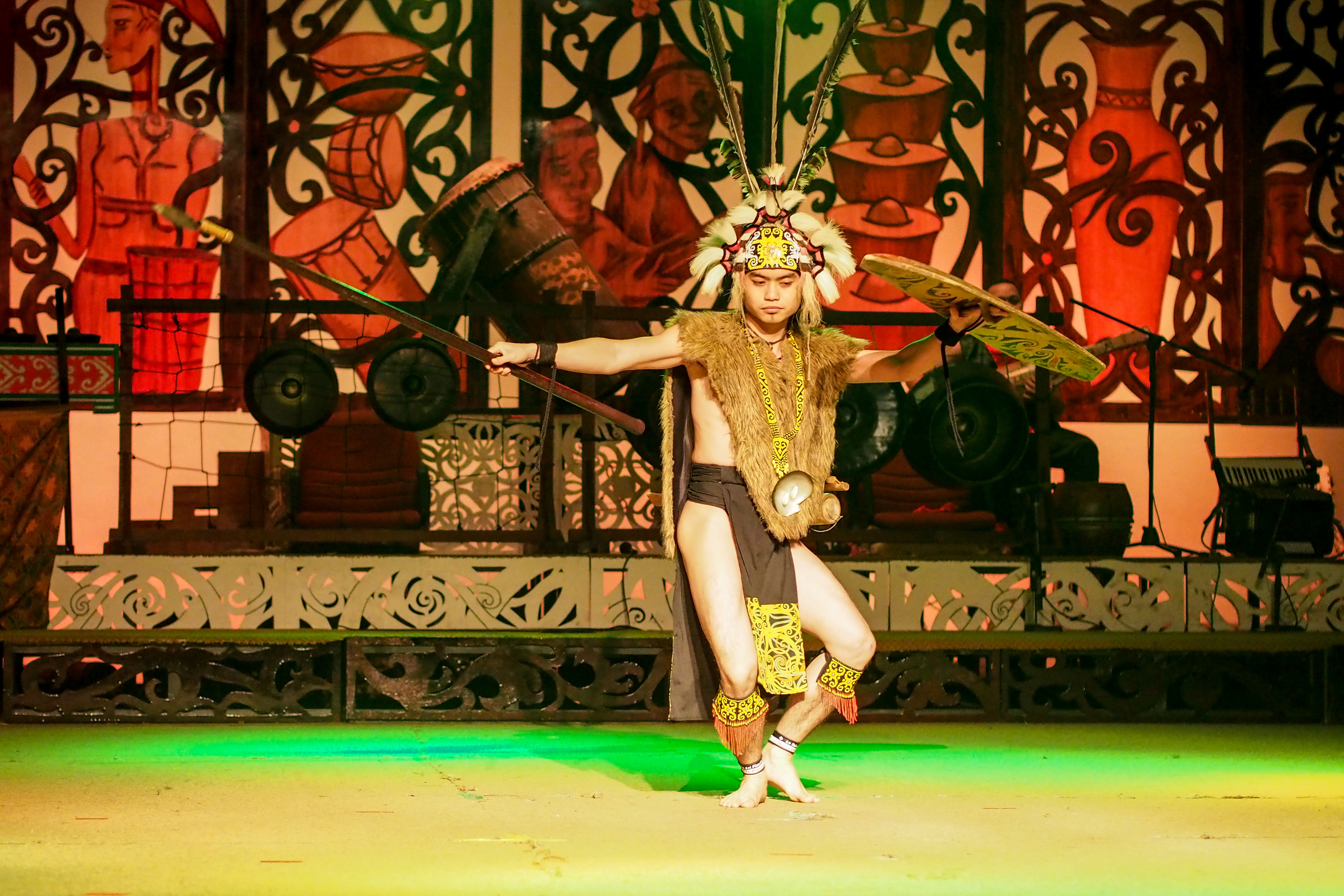
Ngajat, the Iban warrior dance gazetted as part of Sarawak culture

In the years before federation, the colonial government recognised that British education and indigenous culture was influencing a new generation of Iban teachers. Thus, on 15 September 1958, the Borneo Literature Bureau was inaugurated with a charter to nurture and encourage local literature while also supporting the government in its release of documentation, particularly in technical and instructional manuscripts that were to be distributed to the indigenous peoples of Sarawak and Sabah. As well as indigenous languages, documents would also be published in English, Chinese and Malay. In 1977, the bureau came under the authority of the federal government language planning and development agency, the Dewan Bahasa dan Pustaka (DBP), which advocated publication only in Malay ultimately causing the demise of fledgling indigenous literature. (Note: Postill, 2006; ... to encourage local authorship and meet local needs ... (page 51) ... The Bureau ceased to exist in 1977 when it was taken over by the federal body Dewan Bahasa dan Pustaka.(page 55) ... He concludes that DBP cannot publish books in regional languages (pages 59 and 60))

It was a number of decades before print media began to appear in Sarawak. The Sarawak Gazette, published by the Brooke government, recorded a variety of news relating to economics, agriculture, anthropology, archaeology, began circulation in 1870 and continues in modern times. However, in the decades following federation, restrictive laws and connections to businesses have meant that the media is a largely state-owned enterprise. (Note: Postill, 2006. ... the government controls virtually all newspapers in Sarawak (page 76)) One of the earliest known text publications in Borneo, Hikayat Panglima Nikosa (Story of Nikosa the Warrior), was first printed in Kuching, 1876.

There are a number of museums in Sarawak that preserve and maintain artefacts of Sarawak's culture. At the foot of Mount Santubong, Kuching, is Sarawak Cultural Village, a "living museum" that showcases the various ethnic groups carrying out traditional activities in their respective traditional houses. The Sarawak State Museum houses a collection of artefacts such as pottery, textiles, and woodcarving tools from various ethnic tribes in Sarawak, as well as ethnographic materials of local cultures. Orang Ulu's sapeh (a dug-out guitar) is the best known traditional musical instrument in Sarawak and was played for Queen Elizabeth II during her official visit to Sarawak in 1972.

=== Cuisine ===
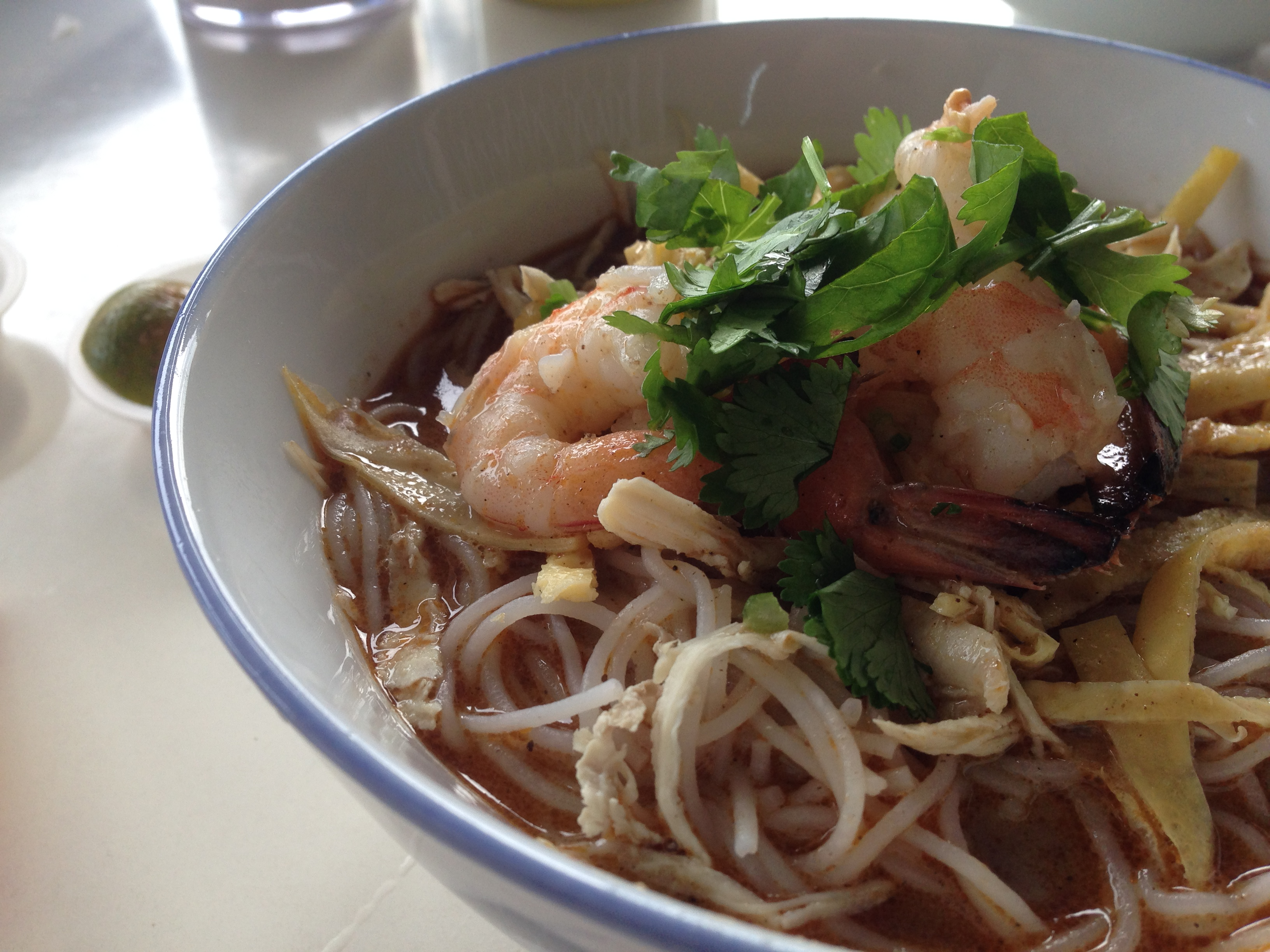
A bowl of Sarawak laksa

Sarawak being home to diverse communities, has a variety of ethnically influenced cuisines and cooking styles rarely found elsewhere in Malaysia. Notable dishes in the state include Sarawak laksa, kolo mee, and ayam pansuh. The state is also known for its Sarawak layer cake dessert.

=== Portrayal in media ===
A number of international films, documentaries, television series had made Sarawak as a principal photography location, with Farewell to the King (1989), The Sleeping Dictionary (2003), and Edge of the World (2021) being most notable. Among the first locally produced movies were the Iban language film Bejalai that was featured in the Berlin Film Festival in 1989 and the horror film Possessed screened in 2006.

=== Holidays and festivals ===
Sarawakians observe a number of holidays and festivals throughout the year. Apart from national Independence Day and Malaysia Day celebrations, the state also celebrates its Independence Day on 22 July and the State Governor's birthday. Ethnic groups also celebrate their own festivals. The open house tradition allows other ethnic groups to join in the celebrations. Sarawak is the only state in Malaysia to declare the Gawai Dayak celebration a public holiday.

=== Sports ===
Sarawak sent its own teams to participate in the 1958 and 1962 British Empire and Commonwealth Games, and 1962 Asian Games; after 1963, Sarawakians competed as part of the Malaysian team. Sarawak hosted the Malaysian SUKMA Games in 1990, 2016 and 2024, and was overall champion in the 1990, 1992, 1994 and 2024 SUKMA games. It also hosted the Para SUKMA Games in 1996, 2016 and 2024, and was overall champion for 14 editions including 13 consecutive editions from 1994 until 2018 and the 2024 edition. In 2019, both Sabah and Sarawak Sports Ministries work together to establish the East Malaysia Sports Commission to facilitate the organisation of more sports programmes in the two territories including other places in the Borneo islands. The Sarawak government also plans to make Sarawak an e-sports hub in the region.

== International relations ==
Sarawak is a sister state/province to Fujian Province in China.

== See also ==
- Bibliography of Sarawak
- List of people from Sarawak
