= Congress Spelling System =

Spelling reform of Malay Rumi Script

The Congress Spelling System (Malay: Ejaan Kongres) is a spelling reform of Malay Rumi Script introduced during the third Malay Congress held in Johor Bahru and Singapore in 1956. The main characteristics of the system are the use of symbols in the Americanist phonetic notation, going by the dictum of one symbol for one phoneme, and the new proposition in the writing of diphthongs.

The innovation was originally intended to replace the Za'aba Spelling and ultimately to become a standard orthography in the Malay speaking world, but did not seem to gain acceptance in general. It was deemed impractical for use by the masses, and certain graphemes proposed by the system were not represented in the common typewriters at that time. Even then, certain groups, particularly those affiliated to the Literary Movement 1950, used the Congress graphemes for diphthongs in their own publications.

== Background ==
In the 1950s, two different orthographies were used in the Malay-speaking world, namely the Republican Spelling System in Indonesia and Za'aba Spelling in British Malaya and Borneo. The Za'ba Spelling System, introduced in 1933, was the improvised version of the earlier orthography introduced by the British scholar, R J Wilkinson. Similarly in Indonesia, the Republican Spelling System was introduced in 1947 to replace the older Dutch Van Ophuijsen Spelling System.

The third Malay congress held in Johor Bahru and Singapore from 16 to 21 September 1956, seek to unite these two different orthographies into a single system. The new orthography, was envisioned to be a better and practical system, which is simplified and using standardized methods of spelling, and emphasized more on the use of Malay phonology system. During the congress, two proposal papers concerning the new orthography was presented by Literary Movement 1950 and Malay Language Association of University of Malaya. Literary Movement 1950, proposed a system already in use by their writers, largely based on Fajar Asia orthography introduced during Japanese occupation in 1943. Malay Language Association of University of Malaya generally rejects the use of digraphs and vehemently promotes the Indonesian spelling elements. A consensus was reached during the congress, and the new orthography was later named Ejaan Kongres (the congress spelling').

In 1957, the Congress Spelling System was published for the first time by Dewan Bahasa dan Pustaka in its language leaflet, DBP bilangan (1), with the title Kaedah Baharu Ejaan Rumi Bahasa Melayu (menurut keputusan Kongres Bahasa dan Persuratan Melayu III) (Malay for 'New Methods of Rumi Spelling of Malay Language (based on the decision of Congress of Malay language and letters III)').

== Reception ==
The Congress Spelling System did not seem to gain acceptance of people in general. The reason was that it was not practical for use by the ordinary people and certain graphemes proposed by the system were not represented in the typewriters. Even then, certain groups, particularly those affiliated to the Literary Movement 1950 used the Congress graphemes for diphthongs in their own publications. This group even reverted to the Wilkinson style of writing the vowels in closed final syllables which was, similar to the Republican style in Indonesia.

Since the Malay sections of publishing houses were mainly manned by members of the Literary Movement 1950 or their sympathisers, the Movement's style of spelling seemed to gain a widespread currency through published works. In the meantime, the schools and the government publications were still using the Za'aba or the school system of spelling. Hence, the public became confused as to which system to follow. Language usage outside the precincts of the school reflected a state of confusion in the minds of the people in the spelling of their language using the Rumi script. It was not unusual to find several systems used in a short passage in the print media not to mention in individual writings.

The state of confusion was ended with the introduction of New Rumi Spelling in 1972, that finally united the different orthographies of the Malay-speaking world into a single system.

== The system ==
In the third Malay Congress of 1956, a total of 16 resolutions were made for orthography, 2 resolutions for phonetics, and a resolution for Jawi alphabet. The list of letters agreed upon for the new orthography are as below. It consists of 20 traditional Malay consonants ⟨b⟩, ⟨c⟩, ⟨d⟩, ⟨g⟩, ⟨h⟩, ⟨j⟩, ⟨k⟩, ⟨l⟩, ⟨m⟩, ⟨n⟩, ⟨ŋ⟩, ⟨ñ⟩, ⟨p⟩, ⟨q⟩, ⟨r⟩, ⟨s⟩, ⟨š⟩, ⟨t⟩, ⟨w⟩, ⟨y⟩ and consonants ⟨f⟩, ⟨q⟩, ⟨v⟩, ⟨x⟩ for adopted sounds from foreign languages.

Congress Spelling Rumi alphabet
Uppercase Latin alphabet	A	B	C	D	E	F	G	H	I	J	K	L	M	N	Ŋ	Ñ	O	P	Q	R	S	Š	T	U	V	W	X	Y	Z
Lowercase Latin alphabet	a	b	c	d	e	f	g	h	i	j	k	l	m	n	ŋ	ñ	o	p	q	r	s	š	t	u	v	w	x	y	z
IPA phonemes	a	b	tʃ	d	e and ə	f	g	h	i	dʒ	k	l	m	n	ŋ	ŋ	o	p	q	r	s	ʃ	t	u	v	w	~ks	j	z

=== Schwa ===
The Congress Spelling also consists of 6 vowel sounds represented by 5 letters; ⟨a⟩, ⟨e⟩, ⟨i⟩, ⟨o⟩, ⟨u⟩, with ⟨e⟩ representing both /e/ and /ə/ sounds. It differed markedly with Za'aba spelling that differentiates /e/ and /ə/ sounds with letters ⟨e⟩ and ⟨ĕ⟩ respectively.

Za'aba spelling	Congress spelling	IPA	Meaning
bĕrhemat	berhemat	/bərhemat/	being prudent
mĕngganggu	meñgañgu	/məŋgaŋgu/	disturb
mĕrdeka	merdeka	/mərdeka/	independence
tĕntĕra	tentera	/təntəra/	soldier

=== Choice of graphemes ===
The principal feature of Congress Spelling is the representation of a phoneme with a grapheme or a single letter only. Thus, it rejects the use of digraphs commonly found in the earlier orthographies.

Za'aba	Congress	IPA	Za'aba example	Congress example	Meaning
ch	c	/tʃ/	chichak	cicak	gecko
ng	ŋ	/ŋ/	nganga	ŋaŋa	opening widely (for mouth or door)
ngg	ñ	/ŋ/	tunggu	tuñgu	wait
sh	š	/ʃ/	shisha	šiša	shisha

=== Diphthongs ===
The Congress also made a new proposition in the writing of diphthongs. Whereas the Wilkinson and the Za'aba systems had ⟨au⟩, ⟨ai⟩ and ⟨oi⟩, the Congress system suggested ⟨aw⟩, ⟨ay⟩ and ⟨oy⟩.

Za'aba	Congress	IPA	Za'aba example	Congress example	Meaning
au	aw	/au̯/	kalau	kalaw	if
ai	ay	/ai̯/	tirai	tiray	curtain
oi	oy	/oi̯/	boroi	boroy	pot-belly

=== Morphemes ===
A fixed rule for the choice of vowels for morphemes in disyllabic words were established in the Congress Spelling. In the event that the morpheme of the first syllable uses vowels ⟨e⟩ and ⟨o⟩, the morpheme bound to the final syllable must use vowels ⟨e⟩ and ⟨o⟩. On the other hand, if morpheme of the first syllable uses vowels other than ⟨e⟩ and ⟨o⟩, the morpheme bound to the final syllable must use vowels ⟨i⟩ and ⟨u⟩.

This Congress rule contradicts with the old Za'aba spelling that concentrate more on the native Malay phonology rather than using the existing theories and linguistic techniques. In Za'aba spelling, for any final syllable that ends with letters ⟨k⟩ or ⟨h⟩, the morpheme bound to it must use vowel ⟨e⟩ instead of ⟨i⟩, with the exceptions given to diphthong ⟨ai⟩. Conversely, for any final syllable that ends with letters other than ⟨k⟩ or ⟨h⟩, the morpheme bound to it must use vowel ⟨i⟩ instead of ⟨e⟩, with exceptions given to first syllable using vowels ⟨o⟩ or ⟨e⟩, thus vowel ⟨e⟩ must be used instead.

==== Final syllables that end with letters k or h ====
Za'aba spelling	Congress spelling	Meaning
aleh	alih	to move
leteh	letih	tired
balek	balik	to return
chantek	cantik	beautiful
Exceptions to words with diphthong ⟨ai⟩
Za'aba Spelling	Congress spelling	Meaning
naik	naik	to increase
baik	baik	good
raih	raih	to gain

==== Final syllables that end with letters other than ⟨k⟩ or ⟨h⟩ ====
Za'aba spelling	Congress spelling	Meaning
nasib	nasib	fate
katil	katil	bed
kutip	kutip	to pick
pasir	pasir	sand
Exceptions to open syllables with vowel ⟨o⟩ and ⟨e⟩
Za'aba spelling	Congress spelling	Meaning
deret	deret	row
leher	leher	neck
bogel	bogel	nude

=== Phonemes for hamza and ayin ===
Malay written in Jawi script generally utilizes both Arabic letters ⟨ء⟩ and ⟨ع⟩, in addition to letter ⟨ق⟩, as glottal stops which transliterated in the old Rumi orthographies with apostrophes ⟨'⟩. The Congress spelling are in agreement that Rumi phonemes for both letters are similar. However, due to differing opinions among the participants, the Congress spelling did not produce any resolution on the use of both phonemes, and opened the issue for public interpretations. The congress nevertheless, proposed four resolutions concerning hamza and ayin.

1. The phonemes shall not be represented by any grapheme when it become onset of first morpheme. For example,

Jawi spelling	Za'aba spelling	Congress spelling	Meaning
عادل	'adil	adil	fair
عالم	'alam	alam	nature
علماء	'ulama	ulama	scholar

2. The phonemes shall be represented by letter ⟨k⟩ only if they become the coda of the last morpheme. Example as follows

Jawi spelling	Old spelling	Congress spelling	Meaning
تيدق	tida'	tidak	no
أنق	ana'	anak	child
دودوق	dudo'	duduk	sit

3. The phonemes shall be represented by either letter ⟨k⟩ or ⟨'⟩, if they become the coda of the first morpheme. Example as follows

Jawi spelling	Congress spelling	Alternative spelling	Meaning
معلوم	maklum	ma'lum	informed
موءمين	mukmin	mu'min	believer
باءيق	baik	ba'ik	good

4. To avoid confusion, the apostrophe ⟨'⟩ can be used to represent phoneme of glottal stops only if it become onset for non-first morpheme. Therefore, ⟨مسئله⟩ (Malay Jawi for 'problem') should be spelled as ⟨mas'alah⟩ in Rumi, not ⟨mas-alah⟩, ⟨masaalah⟩ or ⟨maskalah⟩.

=== The letter ⟨h⟩ ===
There are a total of four resolutions concerning the letter ⟨h⟩ in the Congress Spelling System.

1. If the /h/ sound becomes the onset of the first syllable, it can be either maintained, removed or replaced with ⟨'⟩.

Congress spelling	Alternative spelling	Meaning
hala	'ala	direction
hadap	'adap	facing
hulu	'ulu	upstream
hujan	'ujan	rain

2. If the /h/ is in between two similar vowels, the letter ⟨h⟩ must be maintained instead of using ⟨'⟩

Congress spelling	Wrong spelling	Meaning
bahan	~~ba'an~~	ingredient
leher	~~le'er~~	neck
bohoñ	~~bo'oñ~~	to lie

However, if the /h/ is in between two different vowels, the letter ⟨h⟩ can be either removed or maintained

Congress spelling	Alternative spelling	Meaning
mahu	mau	want
jahit	jait	to sew
tahun	taun	year

3. For similar sounding words that carry different meaning, both rules of maintaining and removing ⟨h⟩ are applied to differentiate their meaning.

Congress spelling	Meaning	Congress spelling	Meaning
tahu	tofu	tau	to know
bahu	shoulder	bau	smell
harus	should	arus	current

4. For letter ⟨h⟩ that becomes a coda for morpheme, it must be maintained

Congress spelling	Wrong spelling	Meaning
lemah	~~lema~~	weak
tanah	~~tana~~	soil
boleh	~~bole~~	can
teduh	~~tedu~~	to shelter
rahsia	~~rasia~~	secret
mahkota	~~makota~~	crown

Exceptions are given to Malay words that derived from foreign words. Therefore, ⟨sekolah⟩ ('school') can also be spelled as ⟨sekola⟩ and ⟨Eropah⟩ ('Europe') can also be spelled as ⟨Eropa⟩.

=== Hyphens ===
The use of hyphens commonly found in the old spellings, is discontinued in the Congress spelling except in three conditions; reduplication, compound words and for line breaks. Malay affixes like di-, ke-, ter-, -kan, -an, and particles like -lah, -tah, -kah, and -nya are no longer hyphenated, but combined with the words.

Za'aba spelling	Congress spelling	Meaning
bila-kah	bilakah	when
apa-lah	apalah	what a

The hyphen remains in use between components of reduplicated words, like menari-nari ('keeps on dancing') and rumah-rumah ('houses'). However, for compound words like setia-usaha ('secretary'), jawatan-kuasa ('committee'), kerja-sama ('teamwork'), exceptions are given to compound words that already firmly embedded like matahari ('sun'), purbakala ('ancient'), and tanggungjawab ('responsibility').

=== Adoption of Indonesian spelling ===
The Congress Spelling vehemently promoted the Indonesian Republican Spelling System, which in certain words, are deemed in harmony with the original pronunciation.

Za'aba spelling	Congress spelling	Meaning
ayer	air	water
kerana	karena	because
wang	uang	money
erti	arti	meaning
hairan	héran	astonish
kurnia	karunia	gift
kelmarin	kemarin	the day before yesterday
ia-itu	yaitu	namely

== Bibliography ==
- Asmah Omar (1989), "The Malay Spelling Reform" (PDF), Journal of the Simplified Spelling Society
- Hashim Musa (1997), Epigrafi Melayu: Sejarah Sistem Tulisan dalam Bahasa Melayu (Malay epigraphy: A history of writing systems in Malay language), Dewan Bahasa dan Pustaka, ISBN 978-9-8362-5729-1
- Ismail Dahaman (2007), Ejaan Rumi Sepanjang Zaman (Complete history of Rumi spellings), Dewan Bahasa dan Pustaka, ISBN 978-9-8362-9278-0
- Muhammad Ariff Ahmad (1993), "Ejaan Rumi Bahasa Melayu ('The Rumi Spelling of Malay Language)" (PDF), Pesan: Kumpulan makalah sempena Bulan Bahasa
- Mohd Naim Daipi (1990), "Perkembangan Ejaan Rumi Bahasa Melayu. Bahagian II ('The Evolution of Rumi Spelling of Malay Language. Part II')" (PDF), Sekata, 8 (2)
