= Sarawak Malay =

Malayic language

- Kelakar Sarawak
- Native to: Sarawak
- Native speakers: (undated figure of Unknown)
- Language family: Austronesian: Malayo-Polynesian; (disputed); Malayic; Sarawak Malay
- Dialects: Kuching; Saribas; Sibu
- Writing system: Latin Script and Jawi Script

Language codes
- ISO 639-3: (covered by zlm)
- Glottolog: sara1351

Sarawak Malay (Standard Malay: Bahasa Melayu Sarawak or Bahasa Sarawak, Jawi: بهاس ملايو سراوق, Sarawak Malay: Kelakar Sarawak, Jawi: كلاكر سراوق) is a Malayic language native to the State of Sarawak. It is a common language used by natives of Sarawak and also as the important mother tongue for the Sarawakian Malay people.

The Sarawakian Malay language also bears strong similarities with the West Kalimantan Malay language around Sanggau, Sintang and Sekadau in the northern part of the West Kalimantan province of Indonesia.

== Dialects ==
According to Asmah Haji Omar (2015), Sarawak Malay can be divided into three dialects, the Kuching dialect spoken in Kuching and Kota Samarahan, the Saribas dialect spoken in Saribas, and the Sibu dialect spoken in Sibu. In Miri and Limbang, a variety of Malay closer to Brunei Malay is spoken.

According to Collins (2016), the differences between the Kuching and Saribas dialects of Sarawak Malay are greater than those between Kelantan and Terengganu Malay and between Malaccan and Johor Malay.

== Phonology ==
=== Consonants ===
The consonantal inventory of Sarawak Malay consists of 19 phonemes as seen in the table below.

		Labial	Dental	Denti-alv./ Alveolar	Post-alv./ Palatal	Velar	Glottal
Nasal		m		n	ɲ	ŋ	
Plosive/ Affricate	voiceless	p		t	t͡ʃ	k	ʔ
Plosive/ Affricate	voiced	b		d	d͡ʒ	ɡ	
Fricative	voiceless			s			h
Fricative	voiced					ɣ	
Approximant				l	j	w	

Note(s):

- Sarawak Malay /ɣ/ corresponds to /r/ in Standard Malay so goreng /ɡoreŋ/ 'fried' corresponds to /ɡoɣeŋ/ in Sarawak Malay.
  - Unlike in many Peninsular Malaysian dialects, /ɣ/ is not silent in word-final position as in /bakaɣ/ 'to burn' and /tohoɣ/ 'shallow'.
  - In the Sibu dialect, /ɣ/ is uvular [ʁ] instead of velar.
  - In the Saribas dialect, final /ɣ/ is weakened to [^{ɣ} ~ ^{ə}], as in [bəna^{ɣ} ~ bəna^{ə}] 'true'.
- In the Saribas dialect, final /l/ is realised as [e] as in [botoe] 'bottle' and [bakwe] 'basket'.
- Word-initial ⟨h⟩ in Standard Malay in words like halus 'granular' and hampas 'spoil' is dropped in Sarawak Malay so they are pronounced as /alus/ and /ampas/ instead. There are some exceptions such as haram 'forbidden' though they are usually loanwords.
- Word-final /k/ is pronounced as a velar stop [k̚] rather than as a glottal stop [ʔ] as in Malaysian Standard Malay, so words like /landak/ 'porcupine' and /ŋad͡ʒak/ 'to invite' are pronounced as [landak̚] and [ŋad͡ʒak̚] rather than as *[landaʔ] and *[ŋad͡ʒaʔ].
- Unlike in many other varieties of Malay, [ʔ] is phonemically distinct from [k], with minimal pairs such as [ad͡ʒaʔ] 'only' and [ad͡ʒak̚] 'to invite' and [kəɣaʔ] 'monkey' and [kəɣak̚] 'crust'.
- Many words in Standard Malay that end in a vowel have a glottal stop /ʔ/ added in Sarawak Malay. This can be seen in words such as /lupaʔ/ 'to forget' and /pəɲoʔ/ 'turtle', which correspond to lupa and penyu in Standard Malay. This can also be seen in a few words that end in /r/ in Standard Malay where /ʔ/ has replaced the final consonant, such as in /aeʔ/ 'water' and /ɡuɡoʔ/ 'to fall (of leaves)' which correspond to Standard Malay air and gugur.
- Word-final /-iŋ, -im/ have merged with /-in/ in Sarawak Malay, so Standard Malay kuning /kuniŋ/ 'yellow' and musim /musim/ 'season' correspond to Sarawak Malay /kunin/ and /musin/. In fact, the capital of Sarawak, Kuching, is written as Kuchin in older maps, reflecting the regional pronunciation of the city name.

=== Vowels ===
==== Monophthongs ====
Sarawak Malay has the same vowel inventory as Standard Malay, /a, i, e, u, o, ə/. However, the distribution and allophonic realisations of these vowels are a little different.

	Front	Central	Back
Close	i		u
Close-Mid	e		o
Mid		ə	
Open-Mid	(ɛ)		(ɔ)
Open		a	

Note(s):

- Word-final ⟨a⟩ as in ada 'to be' and raja 'king' is pronounced as /a/ in the Kuching dialect but as /o/ in the Saribas dialect. This means the two words would be pronounced as /ada/ and /ɣad͡ʒa/ in the Kuching dialect and as /ado/ and /ɣad͡ʒo/ in the Saribas dialect.
- The vowels /e, o/ can be realized either as close-mid [e, o] or as open-mid [ɛ, ɔ].
- The Standard Malay diphthongs /aj, aw/ correspond to /e, o/ in Sarawak Malay as in /pande/ 'smart' and /pulo/ 'island' (compare Standard Malay pandai and pulau). In some words, Standard Malay /aj/ corresponds instead to /i/ such as in /ɣami/ 'many' and /t͡ʃabi/ 'chili' (compare Standard Malay ramai and cabai).
- In the Saribas dialect, final /i, u/ are diphthongised in final position to [ij ~ ɨj] and [uw], as in [atij ~ atɨj] 'heart' and [batuw] 'stone'.
- Lowering of Proto-Malayic penultimate *i and *u occurred with a different lexical distribution compared to Standard Malay. In some cases, Sarawak Malay shows phonological retention while it shows innovation in others. For example, Sarawak Malay /uɣaŋ/ 'person' and /ikuɣ/ 'tail' show the same penultimate vowel as Proto-Malayic *uɣaŋ and *Sikuɣ (compare Standard Malay orang and ekor), but /keɣeʔ/ 'left' and /lejaʔ/ 'ginger' differ in the quality of their penultimate vowels from Proto-Malayic *(kA-)iri and *halia (compare Standard Malay kiri and halia).

==== Diphthongs ====
Sarawak Malay only has one diphthong, /oj/, found in words like paloi 'idiot' /paloj/.

=== Comparison with Standard Malay ===
Below is a table showing sound correspondences between Standard Malay and Sarawak Malay.

Standard Malay Sound	Sarawak Malay Correspondence	Example (Standard Malay ≙ Sarawak Malay)		
final /-a/	/-o/ (Saribas) /-a/ (Kuching)	nama /nama/ 'name'	≙	/namo/ (Saribas) /nama/ (Kuching)
final /-i/	[-ij ~ ɨj] (Saribas) [-i] (Kuching)	hati /hati/ 'liver'	≙	[atij ~ atɨj] (Saribas) [ati] (Kuching)
final /-u/	[-uw] (Saribas) [-u] (Kuching)	kayu /kaju/ 'wood'	≙	[kajuw] (Saribas) [kaju] (Kuching)
final /-ar/	[-a^{(ɣ)}] (Saribas) [-aɣ] (Kuching)	benar /bənar/ 'true'	≙	[bena^{(ɣ)}] (Saribas) [bənaɣ] (Kuching)
final /-ir/	[-ia^{ʌ}] (Saribas) [-iɣ] (Kuching)	pasir /pasir/ 'sand'	≙	[pasia^{ʌ}] (Saribas) [pasiɣ] (Kuching)
final /-ur/	[-ua^{ʌ}] (Saribas) [-uɣ ~ ɔɣ] (Kuching)	telur /təlur/ 'egg'	≙	[təlua^{ʌ}] (Saribas) [təluɣ ~ təlɔɣ] (Kuching)
final /-al/	[-e] (Saribas) [-al] (Kuching)	bantal /bantal/ 'pillow'	≙	[bantae] (Saribas) [bantal] (Kuching)
final /-il/	[-ie] (Saribas) [-il] (Kuching)	kail /kail/ 'hook'	≙	[ka^{j}ie] (Saribas) [kail] (Kuching)
final /-ul/	[-ue] (Saribas) [-ul] (Kuching)	bakul /bakul/ 'basket'	≙	[bakwe] (Saribas) [bakul] (Kuching)
final /-ol/	[-oe] (Saribas) [-ol] (Kuching)	botol /botol/ 'bottle'	≙	[botoe] (Saribas) [botol] (Kuching)

== Morphology ==
Sarawak Malay has an agent focus or active prefix, ng- which corresponds to the Standard Malay prefix, meng-. When attached to a stem, if the stem starts with a consonant, the prefix assimilates to the consonant in place of articulation, and the original initial consonant of the stem is deleted. If the stem starts with a vowel, the prefix is just attached with no other changes. The affixation process is shown in the table below:

Initial Consonant	Assimilated Prefix	Example Stem	Result of Affixation	Standard Malay Equivalent
⟨p⟩	⟨m⟩	putus (to snap)	mutus	memutus
⟨b⟩	⟨m⟩	beli (to snap)	meli	membeli
⟨t⟩	⟨n⟩	tolak (to push)	nolak	menolak
⟨d⟩	⟨n⟩	dengar (to listen)	nengar	mendengar
⟨s⟩	⟨ny⟩	sangkut (to hang)	nyangkut	menyangkut
⟨c⟩	⟨ny⟩	cuba (to try)	nyuba	mencuba
⟨j⟩	⟨ny⟩	julok (to pick)	nyulok	menjolok
⟨-⟩	⟨ng⟩	amal (to practise)	ngamal	mengamal
⟨k⟩	⟨ng⟩	kata (to say)	ngata	mengata
⟨g⟩	⟨ng⟩	gosok (to rub)	ngosok	menggosok

== Vocabulary ==
Sarawak Malay has a rich vocabulary of which many words, while also found in Standard Malay, have completely different meanings.

Difference in meaning
Word	Meaning in Sarawak Malay	Meaning in Standard Malay
agak	'to meet'	'to guess'
kelakar	'to talk'	'funny'
tangga	'to look'	'stairs'
tikam	'to throw'	'to stab'
tetak	'to laugh'	'to cut'
marak	'to waste'	'to refract'

The numbers of Sarawak Malay differ a bit from their Standard Malay counterparts.

Numbers
Sarawak Malay	Standard Malay	English translation
satu	satu	'one'
duak	dua	'two'
tiga	tiga	'three'
empat	empat	'four'
limak	lima	'five'
nam	enam	'six'
tujoh	tujuh	'seven'
lapan	lapan	'eight'
semilan	sembilan	'nine'
sepuloh	sepuluh	'ten'

The pronouns too differ quite significantly, with the first and second person pronouns (both singular and plural) both being related to the first person plural pronouns ( and kita) of Standard Malay.

Personal pronouns
Sarawak Malay	Standard Malay	English translation
kamek	saya / aku	'I' / 'me'
kamek empun	saya / aku punya	'my' / 'mine'
kamek orang	kita/kami	'we'
kitak	kau / kamu / awak	'you' (informal, singular)
kitak empun	kau / kamu / awak punya	'your' / 'yours'
kitak orang	kamu / awak semua	'you' (plural)
nya	dia	'he' / 'she' / 'it'
nya empun	dia punya	'his' / 'her' / 'hers'
sidak nya empun	mereka punya	'theirs'
sidak nya kedirik	mereka sendiri	'themselves'

Below is a non-exhaustive list of lexical differences between Standard Malay and Sarawak Malay.

Standard Malay	Sarawak Malay	English translation
anjing	asuk	'dog'
ayam / manuk (archaic)	manok	'chicken'
baring	gurin	'to lie down'
bodoh	paloi	'stupid'
berlari	berekot	'to run'
garang	gaok	'angry'
hijau	gadong / ijo	'green' (colour)
kapal terbang	belon	'aeroplane'
kecil	kecik / salus	'small'
kucing	pusak	'cat'
jalan raya	jeraya	'road'
juga	juak	'also'
sombong	lawa	'arrogant'
kenapa	kenak	'why'
kenyang	kedak	'full' (eating)
mahu	maok	'to want'
merah jambu	kalas	'pink'
pisau	ladin (Malay/Melanau) dandin / pisok	'knife'
sekarang / kini	kinek	'now'
singgah	berambeh	'to go to'
tembikai	semangka	'watermelon'
tak / tidak	si / sik	'negative marker'
tipu	bulak	'to lie'
ya / haah	aok	'yes'
lihat / tengok	tangga	'to see'
berkira	cokot	'picky'

Many of the words used in Sarawak Malay nowadays were borrowed from many languages such as English. Some English words that have been borrowed and have undergone significant pronunciation changes are as follows:

English loanword	Original English form
eksen	'action'
bol	'ball'
kaler	'colour'
kapet	'carpet'
pancet	'punctured'
henpon	'handphone'
moto	'motor'
prempan	'frying pan'
uren	'orange'
raun	'round'

== Colloquial and contemporary usage ==
Contemporary usage of Sarawak Malay includes contemporary Malay words or incorporated from other languages, spoken by the urban speech community, which may not be familiar to the older generation. E.g.: SMS language. E.g.:

English	Sarawak Malay	SMS Text
you	kitak	ktk
me	kamek	kmk
no	sik	x
message	mesej	msg
nothing	sikda	xda
why	kenak	knk

== Media ==
TVS, a regional television broadcaster serving Sarawak from the state government-owned Sarawak Media Group has programming tailored in the language.
