= Indonesian–Malaysian orthography reform of 1972 =

Malay Latin spelling reform used since 1972

The Indonesian–Malaysian orthography reform of 1972 was a joint effort between Indonesia and Malaysia to harmonize the spelling system used in their national languages, which are both forms of the Malay language. For the most part, the changes made in the reform are still used today. This system uses the Latin alphabet and in Malaysia is called Joint Rumi Spelling (Malay: Ejaan Rumi Bersama, ERB), and in Indonesia Perfect Spelling or Enhanced Spelling (Indonesian: Ejaan yang Disempurnakan, EYD). It replaced the Za'aba Spelling that was previously standard in Malaysia, Singapore and Brunei, and the Republican Spelling System in Indonesia.

Historically, Indonesia and Malaysia—the two largest Malay-speaking countries, in that order—were divided between two colonial administrations, under the Dutch and British empires respectively. Thus, the development of spelling systems for Rumi script were greatly influenced by the orthographies of their respective colonial tongues. Shortly after the end of Indonesia-Malaysia confrontation in 1966, a common spelling system became among the first items on the agenda of a détente between the two countries.

The new spelling system, known as 'New Rumi Spelling' in Malaysia and 'Perfected Spelling System' in Indonesia, was officially announced in both countries on 16 August 1972. Although the representations of speech sounds are now largely identical in the Indonesian and Malaysian varieties, a number of minor spelling differences remain.

== Background ==
The first known attempt to use the Latin script or 'Rumi' for writing Malay words was by Duarte Barbosa in 1518 in Melaka, shortly after its conquest by the Portuguese in 1511. A few years later, in 1522, the world's first Malay–European dictionary was compiled by Antonio Pigafetta, an Italian companion of Ferdinand Magellan. This was subsequently followed by many other European traders, adventurers, explorers and scholars who invented their own Rumi spelling systems. Among notable Rumi spelling systems that existed before the 20th century were the orthographies of Cornelis de Houtman (1595), Davidis Haex (1631), Thomas Bowrey (1701), J.Howison (1800), William Marsden (1812), Claudius Thomsen (1820), John Crawfurd (1848), Straits Settlements (1878), Frank Swettenham (1881), and William Edward Maxwell (1882). All these systems were mainly developed using the method of transliteration from Jawi (Arabic-derived Malay script). The divergences of various spelling systems that existed in colonial Malaya necessitated the need for a commonly accepted spelling system. A major orthographic reform was initiated by British scholar and administrator Richard James Wilkinson in 1904, from which the Wilkinson spelling was introduced, which became the official system widely used in all British colonies and protectorates in Malaya, Singapore and Borneo. The Wilkinson spelling is very similar to the modern orthography used in both Indonesia and Malaysia, except that modern c and sy were instead ch and sh at that time.

In 1924, another reform was devised by a notable Malay grammarian, Za'ba, which was later adopted in all schools from the 1930s onwards. After the short-lived Fajar Asia system used during Japanese occupation (1941–1945), the Third Malay Congress introduced the Congress system in 1956. The innovative Congress System gained widespread currency through published works but remained impractical for the use of the masses. In the meantime, schools and government publications continued using the Za'aba system. Hence, the general public became increasingly confused with the existence of different spelling systems. As a result, it was common during this era to find several spelling systems concurrently used in printed media and individual writings.

In 1959, the Federation of Malaya and Indonesia signed a cultural agreement, which included the implementation of a common spelling system. The system agreed to in this agreement was known as the 'Malindo System'. However, because of its similarity with the Congress system, which was proven impractical, and the ensuing diplomatic tension between Indonesia and Malaya over the formation of Malaysia, the system was never implemented or even published. Following the end of Indonesia–Malaysia confrontation in 1966, a common spelling system became among the first items on the agenda of a detente between the two countries. Language experts from both countries began to work on formulating a new system that was practical and above all accepted by the two parties concerned. Six years later, on 16 August 1972, the common spelling system, which came to be known as 'New Rumi Spelling' in Malaysia and 'Perfected Spelling System' in Indonesia, was officially announced by Prime Minister Tun Abdul Razak in Malaysia and President Suharto in Indonesia.

Soon after, another Malay-speaking country, Brunei, decided to adopt the new common system to replace the Malaysian Za'aba system previously used in the country. Although Singapore does not use Malay as much as its neighbours, because of its four-language policy (consisting of English, Mandarin, Malay and Tamil), its Malay language developments had always been closely linked with those of Malaysia. There has never been anything official on Singapore's part on its stand on the new spelling, but implementation of this system has taken place as evidenced by publications in Malay produced in Singapore.

== Implementation ==
A grace period of five years was given in both countries for people to get used to the new system. In Malaysia this meant that students were not penalised for making mistakes in spelling words according to the old systems. However, a rigorous programme was undertaken by the government's Language and Literacy Agency (Dewan Bahasa dan Pustaka) to see to the implementation of the new spelling system by giving special classes to the people, especially teachers and administrators, on how to spell their language according to the new spelling system. The grace period also allowed publishers to dispose of their old stocks and to publish revised editions and new titles in the new spelling. Names of roads, places, and institutions had to undergo a change in appearance, using the new spelling system.

== The system ==
=== Removal of diacritics ===
==== Schwa ====
The Za'aba system uses the letter ⟨ĕ⟩ to stand for /ə/ while letter ⟨e⟩ stands for the /e/ sound. The Malay language shows a higher frequency of /ə/ compared to /e/, thus the Za'aba style was not economical in terms of the time taken for writing, quite apart from the fact that the text was full of diacritics. Furthermore, with a few exceptions, the occurrence of /e/ is predictable, as /e/ usually occurs in a harmonious relationship with itself and /o/ in two contiguous syllables where the vowel of the other syllable is also /e/ or /o/. On the other hand, the schwa enters such a relationship with /i/ and /u/. The new system, guided by the Wilkinson system, has discarded them and uses ⟨e⟩ for both the vowels concerned.

Za'aba spelling	New Rumi Spelling	IPA	Meaning
bĕrhemat	berhemat	/bərhemat/	being prudent
pĕnyĕlĕsaian	penyelesaian	/pəɲələsaian/	solution
mĕrdeka mĕrdĕheka	merdeka	/mərdeka/	independence
tĕntĕra	tentera	/təntəra/	soldier

==== Apostrophes ====
In the old systems, the apostrophe was placed before a vowel, if the vowel is syllable-initial, to indicate the voiced pharyngeal fricative which appeared in loanwords from Arabic. However, Malay does not have this phoneme in its inventory. Most Malays actualise this sound as a glottal stop. Since syllable- and word-initial vowels in Malay are always accompanied by the glottal stop, the apostrophe to indicate the Arabic pharyngeal fricative was discarded, so spelling certain Arabic loanwords with one grapheme less, as:

Old spellings	New Rumi Spelling	IPA	Meaning
Juma'at	Jumaat	/dʒumʕat/	Friday
ta'at	taat	/taʕat/	loyal
'alim	alim	/ʕalɪm/	pious
ni'mat	nikmat	/niʕmat/	pleasure

==== Hyphens ====
The use of the hyphen became significantly less with the new spelling system. The old spelling systems were liberal in the use of the hyphen e.g. between the affix di- or the postpositional emphatic word lah or the clitic form nya and the root word, or between certain prepositions and the nouns that follow them. In the new spelling, the hyphen in the first set of contexts is removed and the components are written as a complete or whole word; in the second context, the removal of the hyphen results in two distinct words, one a preposition and the other a noun. In the new system, the hyphen remains in use between components of reduplicated words, like menari-nari ('keeps on dancing') and rumah-rumah ('houses').

Old spellings	New Rumi Spelling	IPA	Meaning
di-buat	dibuat	/dibwɒt/ (Malaysia) /dibuat/ (Indonesia)	is made
rumah-nya	rumahnya	/rumahɲa/	his/her house
ambil-lah	ambillah	/ambɪllah/	take!
di-rumah	di rumah	/dirumah/	at the house
ka-rumah	ke rumah	/kərumah/	to the house
di-balek	di balik	/dibaliʔ/	behind
di-balek	dibalik	/dibaliʔ/	to be overturned

=== The choice of graphemes ===
For the voiceless palato-alveolar affricate /tʃ/, spelt in Malaysia as ⟨ch⟩ and Indonesia as ⟨tj⟩, a new grapheme was agreed on: ⟨c⟩. Previous to the new spelling system, ⟨c⟩ did not have the status of a grapheme either in Malaysia or in Indonesia. The common spelling system has given it graphemic status. It is not only simplicity that is indicated in the choice of ⟨c⟩, but also the end of the confusion arising from ⟨ch⟩ for people reading Malaysian and Indonesian texts. In Malaysia, ⟨ch⟩ stood for the voiceless palato-alveolar affricate /tʃ/ (represented by ⟨c⟩ in the new spelling) while in Indonesia it was for the velar fricative /x/ (represented by ⟨kh⟩ in the new spelling).

Old Indonesian spelling	Old Malaysian spelling	Phoneme	New common spelling	Example – Indonesian	Example – Malaysian	New spelling	IPA	Meaning
tj	ch	/tʃ/	c	tjitjak	chicak	cicak	/tʃitʃaʔ/	Hemidactylus platyurus
	dh	/dˤ/	d		dharab	darab	/dˤarab/	multiply
	dz	/zˤ/	z		dzalim	zalim	/zˤolɪm/ or /zalɪm/	cruel
sj	sh	/ʃ/	sy	sjaitan	shaitan	syaitan	/ʃaitˤɔn/ or /ʃaitan/	Satan
	th	/θ/	s		ithnin	isnin	/iθnɪn/ or /isnɪn/	Monday

A number of graphemes remain in use in Malaysian spelling, and in turn adopted by Indonesians. For example, Indonesians agreed to adopt the Malaysian ⟨j⟩ for the voiced alveolopalatal affricate spelt ⟨j⟩ in English. Linked to the Indonesian acceptance of ⟨j⟩ was their acceptance of the Malaysian ⟨y⟩ for the semivowel. When the Indonesians accepted ⟨y⟩, they also accepted ⟨ny⟩ in place of their ⟨nj⟩, for the /ɲ/ sound. The ⟨h⟩ as a component in certain graphemes is also retained in Malaysian spelling, and it indicates 'gutturalisation'. Such phonemes mostly occur in loan words from Arabic, and they are represented in the graphemes ⟨kh⟩ for /x/, ⟨gh⟩ for /ɣ/ etc. Here, it is worth mentioning that the Indonesian side had agreed to the grapheme ⟨kh⟩ for /x/ to replace their ⟨ch⟩.

Old Indonesian spelling	Old Malaysian spelling	Phoneme	New	Example – Indonesian	Example – Malaysian	New common spelling	IPA	Meaning
dj	j	/dʒ/	j	djudjur	jujur	jujur	/dʒudʒur/	honest
j	y	/j/	y	jajasan	yayasan	yayasan	/jajasan/	foundation
nj	ny	/ɲ/	ny	njonja	nyonya	nyonya	/ɲoɲa/	madam
ch	kh	/x/	kh	achir	akhir	akhir	/axir/~/ahir/	end

=== Reduplication ===
In Malay, reduplication is very productive as a morphological process. There are three types of reduplication in Malay: the reduplication of the first syllable of the root, the reduplication of the stem of a complex word, and the reduplication of the whole word, be it a simple or complex word. In the old spelling systems both in Malaysia and Indonesia, the first type of reduplication was spelt in toto, but the character ⟨2⟩ was used to indicate the reduplication of the second and third types. In the reduplication of the whole word, the character ⟨2⟩ was placed at the end of the word, for example, rumah2 was read as rumah-rumah ('houses'), makan2 as makan-makan ('to while away the time eating').

The writing of the reduplication of the complex word with the character ⟨2⟩ was not neat and consistent. The use of ⟨2⟩ made it possible to write the same word in more than one way. One was to separate the components with a hyphen and place ⟨2⟩ after the component that was duplicated (see ii below), and the other was to place ⟨2⟩ at the end of the whole word (see iii below).

i.	bermain	'to play'
ii.	ber-main2	'to keep on playing'
iii.	bermain2	'to keep on playing'

Both ii and iii above should be read as bermain-main. The first method facilitated reading, but it violated the rule of writing complex words with affixes, namely that an affix should be written together with the stem so that the word appears as a complete whole. As for the second method, while it observed the morphological rule, it caused difficulty in reading. Speakers, especially non-native ones, were prone to reading the second example above as a total reduplication bermain-bermain which is ungrammatical. Although native speakers, with their native competence, may not read bermain2 as a total reduplication, because the total reduplication of forms falling into this pattern does not occur in the language, there are other patterns where native speakers themselves find difficulty in deciding whether the written word with the character ⟨2⟩ represents total reduplication or only that of the stem. An example is sekali2. As a total reduplication, sekali-sekali, it means 'once in a while', whereas as a word which undergoes reduplication only at the stem, sekali-kali, it means '(not) ... at all'.

The use of the character ⟨2⟩ was economical in nature. It was a form of shorthand in writing the cumbersome reduplicated word. However, facilitation in reading and mastering the language was the overriding factor in discarding it altogether as a shorthand symbol for reduplication. This makes the physical writing slower but it has brought simplification to the learning system.

Old spellings	New Rumi Spelling	IPA	Meaning
ber-main2 or bermain2	bermain-main	/bərmaen maen/	to keep on playing
kanak2	kanak-kanak	/kanaʔ kanaʔ/	children
angan2	angan-angan	/aŋan aŋan/	wishful thinking
orang2an	orang-orangan	/oraŋ oraŋan/	scarecrow
terang2an	terang-terangan	/təraŋ təraŋan/	obvious

=== New consonant clusters ===
The old spelling systems in Malaysia and Indonesia did not recognise the existence of consonant clusters at the word-initial and word-final positions. Loanwords which have such clusters are mainly from Dutch and English. They were spelt, based on the established rule of Malay phonology that the syllable structure consists of only a single consonant as its onset and its coda. Therefore, the cluster at the beginning of the word was neutralised by inserting a vowel, usually a schwa, between its components.

Old spellings	New Rumi Spelling	Meaning
perojek	projek (Malaysia) proyek (Indonesia)	project
peroses	proses	process
komplek	kompleks	complex

There were certain words which showed a difference in the perceptions of the Indonesians and the Malaysians on the clusters concerned, viz. on the component that was more significant and should be retained. This concerned mainly clusters with ⟨r⟩ as the penultimate component. As in the examples below, in Indonesia, the ⟨r⟩ was more significant than ⟨t⟩. On the other hand, the Malaysians, perhaps very much influenced by British pronunciation, wrote and pronounced those words with the ⟨t⟩. In their quest for uniformity, the Malaysians and the Indonesians decided to neutralise their differences by putting back both ⟨r⟩ and ⟨t⟩ in those words.

Old Indonesian spelling	Old Malaysian spelling	New common spelling	Meaning	Remark
paspor	paspot	pasport	passport	Indonesians have reverted to the old spelling
impor	impot	import	import	Indonesians have reverted to the old spelling
ekspor	ekspot	eksport	export	Indonesians have reverted to the old spelling
konser	konset	konsert	concert	Indonesians have reverted to the old spelling

With its flexibility rule, the new spelling system has admitted clusters in the initial and final positions of the word. This has facilitated the borrowing of technical terms from English for the various sciences. However, those words which have existed for a long time in the Malay language with one or two components decapitated have been allowed to remain, so as not to cause too much destandardisation. Among those which did not undergo a change in form by having their clusters reinstated are the Malaysian examples of komunis ('communist'), rekod ('record'), moden ('modern').

=== Word-final schwas in loanwords ===
As Malay is essentially disyllabic in nature, monosyllabic words with final consonant clusters in English are assimilated by giving them a disyllabic appearance, namely by placing the grapheme ⟨a⟩ at the end of the word. For example, kuspa from 'cusp', kalka from 'calc'.

The acceptance of the schwa in final closed syllables, as in the word filem ('film'), also linked to the acceptance of ⟨e⟩ for schwa at the end of the word as in koine which has been taken in toto. This has greatly facilitated the work of the various terminology committees of the Dewan Bahasa dan Pustaka, already mentioned, in assimilating loanwords from other languages.

Acceptance of the final schwa does not mean acceptance of something foreign. The pronunciation adopted by the Radio Televisyen Malaysia (RTM) actualises the final ⟨a⟩ as a /ə/, based on the Johor dialect of Southern Peninsular Malaysia. In the northern part of the Peninsula and in Sabah and Sarawak, ⟨a⟩ is realised as /a/, as also in Indonesia. However, the acceptance of this final schwa does not mean that all cases of ⟨a⟩ in the word final position are changed to ⟨e⟩. Native words continue to be spelt with ⟨a⟩, and this ⟨a⟩ can have various styles of pronunciation. The final ⟨e⟩ for schwa is meant only for loanwords.

== See also ==
- Republican Spelling System, for more information on a similar spelling system used in Indonesian in older times.

== Bibliography ==
- Asmah Omar (1989), "The Malay Spelling Reform", Journal of the Simplified Spelling Society, archived from the original on 26 August 2011
- Hashim Musa (1997), Epigrafi Melayu: Sejarah Sistem Tulisan dalam Bahasa Melayu (Malay epigraphy: A history of writing systems in Malay language), Dewan Bahasa dan Pustaka, ISBN 978-9-8362-5729-1
- Ismail Dahaman (2007), Ejaan Rumi Sepanjang Zaman (Complete history of Rumi spellings), Dewan Bahasa dan Pustaka, ISBN 978-9-8362-9278-0
- Barbosa, Duarte (2010), The Book of Duarte Barbosa, An Account of the Countries bordering on the Indian Ocean and their Inhabitants (Volume II, edited by Mansel Longworth Dames), Hakluyt Society, ISBN 978-1-4094-1416-2
- Collins, James T (1998), Malay, World Language: a short history, Dewan Bahasa dan Pustaka, ISBN 978-979-461-537-9
