= Za'aba Spelling =

1924 spelling reform of the Malay alphabet

The Za'aba Spelling (Malay: Ejaan Za'aba) was the second major spelling reform of Malay Rumi Script introduced in 1924. The reform was devised by Zainal Abidin Ahmad or better known by the moniker Za'aba, a notable writer and linguist at Sultan Idris Teachers College. Za'aba's orthographic system principally dealt with the assignment of vowels in closed syllables, distinguished the schwa from the half-open vowel /e/ by a new grapheme ⟨ĕ⟩, and insisted on the use of hyphens to differentiate affixes or post-positional emphases from the infinitives. The system as devised by Za'aba emphasised the importance to represent the original pronunciation of Johor-Riau Malay, where various modern standards of Malay were derived, that he viewed as the most elegant form of Malay.

From 1930s onward, the Za'aba system gained wide sanction and was used officially in education and civil administration of Malaya, Singapore and Brunei, to replace the older Wilkinson spelling (very similar to the modern orthography). After the orthography was implemented in schools, it earned the moniker Ejaan Sekolah ('school spelling system'). Despite its official status, the system was continuously challenged throughout the years as other linguists came up with their own suggestions for a reform. The most notable one was by the Third Malay Congress held in 1956 that introduced the Congress Spelling System. The Za'aba orthography was formally replaced by the New Rumi Spelling in 1972.

== Background ==
The first major orthographic reform of the Malay Rumi Script was initiated by British scholar and administrator Richard James Wilkinson in 1904, introducing the Wilkinson spelling or 'Romanised Malay Spelling', which became the official system widely used in all British colonies and protectorates in Malaya, Singapore and Borneo. Following the growth in the use of Malay in the education system funded by the colonial administration, efforts to improve the Rumi spelling system were undertaken by various organizations, including the notable Sultan Idris Teachers College. In 1924, after 20 years in use, the Wilkinson orthography was improved further in a reform initiated by the linguist Zainal Abidin Ahmad at the Sultan Idris Teachers College. Over the years, the system was progressively improved and was applied in a series of pedoman bahasa ('guide to language') published by the college. Among several publications that applied this orthography are Ilmu Bahasa Melayu Penggal 1 (1926), Pelita Bahasa Melayu Penggal 1 (1941), Daftar Ejaan Jawi-Rumi (1949), all of which were written by Za’aba.

By the 1930s, the Za'aba spelling became the official orthography used in Malaya and even adopted in the education system and civil administration. The Za'aba spelling also gained widespread currency in Brunei and Singapore. Following the adoption of the orthography in schools, it was called the Ejaan Sekolah ('school spelling system'). Despite its official status, the system was continuously challenged throughout the years as other linguists came up with their own suggestions for a reform.

During World War II, a system known as Ejaan Fajar Asia, after the Fajar Asia ('Dawn of Asia') publishing house, was widely used in Malaya and Indonesia. Both countries reverted to their respective old systems as soon as the Japanese occupation ended. In Malaya, however, there were continuous efforts to reform the spelling system. In 1956, the Third Malay Congress introduced another spelling system known as the Congress Spelling System, but it was never widely used. In 1959, another reform, this time jointly initiated by Malaya and Indonesia under a Cultural Agreement, was carried out with the introduction of the Malindo system, but the system was scrapped shortly after, following the Indonesia–Malaysia confrontation. The Za'aba spelling continued to be used up until 1972, when another major reform took place with the introduction of the New Rumi Spelling.

== The system ==
Za'aba's orthographic system principally dealt with the assignment of vowels in final closed syllables, distinguished the schwa from the half-open vowel /e/ by a new grapheme ⟨ě⟩, and insisted on the use of hyphens to differentiate affixes or post-positional emphases from the infinitives. The system emphasised the importance to represent the original pronunciation of Johor-Riau Malay, where various modern standards of Malay were derived, that Za'aba viewed as the most elegant form of Malay.

=== Final closed syllables ===
Proposed changes
Wilkinson	Za'aba	IPA	Meaning
buruk	burok	/buroʔ/	ugly
tĕguh	tĕgoh	/təgoh/	firm
tĕrung	tĕrong	/təroŋ/	eggplant
subur	subor	/subor/	fertile
bilik	bilek	/bilek/	room
jĕrnih	jĕrneh	/jərneh/	clear

There were no particular explanations by Za'aba for such amendments, but based on the reformed words, Za'aba seemed to have emphasized on the phonetic realisation in spelling to reflect their original pronunciation in Malay. This was in contrast to the Wilkinson orthography, and even Republican system in Indonesia, that emphasized more on the vowel coherency represented in the orthography.

==== Schwa ====
Za'aba standardized the marking for the Malay indeterminate vowel or the schwa represented by phonetic sound /ə/, by introducing a new grapheme ⟨ĕ⟩. By having the diacritic mark, the Za'aba system able to differentiate schwa from the half-open vowel /e/, which remains to be represented by letter ⟨e⟩. The objective of this move, was again for the phonetic realisation in spelling to simplify the reading process.

Wilkinson did also use a breve diacritic above the letter ⟨e⟩, ⟨ĕ⟩, in order to represent the schwa, on the Latin-script entries of his work A Malay–English Dictionary (1901), itself published in Singapore. However, this diacritic is often omitted in practice.

Wilkinson	Za'aba	IPA	Meaning
bĕrhemat	bĕrhemat	/bərhemat/	being prudent
pĕnyĕlĕsaian	pĕnyĕlĕsaian	/pəɲələsaian/	solution
mĕrdeka	mĕrdeka mĕrdĕheka	/mərdeka/	independence
tĕntĕra	tĕntĕra	/təntəra/	soldier

=== Hyphens ===
Za'aba also introduced the use of hyphens to differentiate affixes or post-positional emphases from the infinitives.

Wilkinson	Za'aba	IPA	Meaning
dijual	di-jual	/didʒual/	is sold
keretanya	kĕreta-nya	/kəretaɲa/	his/her car
pergilah	pĕrgi-lah	/pərgilah/	go!
di taman	di-taman	/ditaman/	at the park
ke taman	ka-taman	/kətaman/	to the park

== Bibliography ==
- Asmah Omar (1989), "The Malay Spelling Reform", Journal of the Simplified Spelling Society, archived from the original on 2011-08-26
- Muhammed Salehudin Aman (2019), Sinopsis Sistem Ejaan Bahasa Melayu, Dewan Bahasa dan Pustaka, archived from the original on April 6, 2017
- Leow, Rachel (2018), Taming Babel: Language in the Making of Malaysia, Cambridge University Press, ISBN 978-1316602607
- Mohd Zaidi Abd Rozan; Mikami, Yoshiki (2007). "Orthographic Reforms of Standard Malay Online: Towards Better Pronunciation and Construction of a Cross-language Environment". Journal of Universal Language. 8 (1): 129–159. doi:10.22425/jul.2007.8.1.129.
