= Johor Malay =

Malayic language

- Bahasa Melayu Johor بهاس ملايو جوهر
- Cakap Johor
- Pronunciation: [t͡ʃakap̚ d͡ʒoho]
- Native to: Malaysia, Singapore
- Region: Johor, Selangor, Kuala Lumpur, southern Perak, southern Malacca, Singapore
- Native speakers: Unknown (under tag 'zlm')
- Language family: Austronesian: Malayo-Polynesian; Malayic; Johor Malay
- Dialects: Johor Bahru; Muar-Batu Pahat; Mersing

Language codes
- ISO 639-3: zlm
- Glottolog: joho1234 sela1263 kual1254

Johor Malay (Cakap Johor, lit. 'Johor Speech'; Malay: Bahasa Melayu Johor; Jawi: بهاس ملايو جوهر) is a Malayic language that is spoken from Singapore northwards into the Malay Peninsula reaching until southern Perak. More broadly, this variety of Malay is also called Johor-Riau Malay or Riau-Johor Malay, referring to its close relatedness with Riau Malay.

Being the native dialect of early Malay broadcasters of Radio Malaya which was based in Singapore, the accent of this variety of Malay eventually came to be perceived as standard and formed the basis of the schwa-variety pronunciation standard of Standard Malay which now predominates the Malaysian media.

== Dialects ==
Johor Malay can be divided into three dialects:

- Johor Bahru: The most widespread, stretching from Singapore and Johor Bahru to southern Perak.
- Muar-Batu Pahat: Mainly spoken around the towns of Muar and Batu Pahat and reaches as far as southern Malacca.
- Mersing: Spoken mainly around Mersing.

Phonetically, these dialects differ very little from each other. The main difference between them is found in how word-final ⟨ar⟩ and vowel clusters are pronounced.

== Phonology ==
=== Consonants ===
The consonant inventory of Johor Malay consists of 19 consonants, and is largely identical with that of Standard Malay.

| | | Labial | Denti-alv./ Alveolar | Post-alveolar | Palatal | Velar | Glottal |
|---|---|---|---|---|---|---|---|
| Nasal | | m | n | | ɲ | ŋ | |
| Plosive/ Affricate | voiceless | p | t | t͡ʃ | | k | ʔ |
| Plosive/ Affricate | voiced | b | d | d͡ʒ | | | ɡ |
| Fricative | voiceless | | s | | | | h |
| Fricative | voiced | | | | | ɣ | |
| Approximant | | | l | | j | w | |

Notes:

- ⟨r⟩ is realized as a velar fricative /ɣ/ unlike in Standard Malay where it is an alveolar /r/, so a word like rumah 'house' is pronounced /ɣumah/.
- /ɣ/ is silent in word-final position so kotor 'dirty' is pronounced /koto/. The same is true for affixes such as ber- which is pronounced /bә/.
- In the Mersing dialect, a glottal stop /ʔ/ is epenthesized in the middle of vowel clusters, so a word like buah 'fruit' would be pronounced [buʔah].

=== Vowels ===
The vowel inventory of Johor Malay is largely identical to that of schwa-variety Standard Malay pronunciation, except in the Muar dialect where the vowel /ɔ/ is also found.

Monophthongs of Johor Malay
| | Front | Central | Back |
|---|---|---|---|
| Close | i | | u |
| Mid | e | ə | o |
| Mid-open | | | (ɔ) |
| Open | | a | |

Diphthongs of Johor Malay
| Coda | /j/ | /w/ |
|---|---|---|
| /a/ | /aj/ | /aw/ |
| /o/ | /oj/ | |

Notes:

- Word-final ⟨a⟩ is realized as schwa /ә/ so baca 'to read' is pronounced /bat͡ʃə/.
- In closed-final syllables, ⟨i⟩ and ⟨u⟩ are pronounced as /e/ and /o/ so manis 'sweet' and putus 'to snap' are pronounced /manes/ and /putos/.
- In the Muar-Batu Pahat dialect, word-final ⟨ar⟩ is realized as /ɔ/, so while the word ular 'snake' would be pronounced /ula/ in other dialects of Johor, it would be pronounced /ulɔ/ in the Muar-Batu Pahat dialect. This Muar-Batu Pahat feature is believed to be an advanced version of the /aw/ pronunciation found in Malaccan Malay (/ulaw/ < ular) where the /aw/ diphthong has further monophthongized into /ɔ/.

== Grammar ==
Johor Malay is perhaps most noted for its use of clause-final tapi 'but' (mostly in the state of Johor), which would normally be used clause-initilally in Standard Malay and in other varieties of Malay, as shown below:

Aku suka nasi beriani ayam ni, beriani gamlah tapi.
{} {} {} {} {} {} {} {} tapi
1SG like rice biryani chicken DEM biryani gam-PTCL but
"I like chicken biryani rice, but only with gam biryani though."

Aku suka nasi beriani ayam ni, tapi beriani gamlah.
{} {} {} {} {} {} tapi {} {}
1SG like rice biryani chicken DEM CONJ biryani gam-PTCL
"I like chicken biryani rice, but only with gam biryani though."

== Vocabulary ==
Like any other variety of Malay, Johor Malay contains a number of words either unique to itself or not typically used in Standard Malay. Below is a non-exhaustive list of such words as found in Johor:

Vocabulary Comparison
| | Johor Malay | Standard Malay | English meaning |
|---|---|---|---|
| 1 | boyak | gemuk | fat |
| 2 | kemut | kedekut | greedy |
| 3 | gebar | selimut | blanket |
| 4 | korek | asah | sharpen (a pencil) |
| 5 | ngonyel | kunyah | chew |
