= Zainal Abidin Ahmad (writer) =

Malaysian writer and linguist

Yang Berbahagia Tan Sri Zainal Abidin Ahmad PMN
- زين العابدين أحمد
- Born: Zainal Abidin bin Ahmad; 16 September 1895; Batu Kikir, Negeri Sembilan, Federated Malay States, British Malaya (now Malaysia)
- Died: 23 October 1973 (aged 78); Petaling Jaya, Selangor, Malaysia
- Resting place: Jalan Ampang Muslim Cemetery, Kuala Lumpur
- Other name: Za'aba or Za'ba
- Organisation(s): Malay Language and Literary Congress
- Movement: Malayan Academic Movement

Tan Sri Zainal Abidin bin Ahmad (Jawi: زين العابدين بن أحمد; 16 September 1895 – 23 October 1973) or better known by the moniker Za'aba (alternatively spelled Za'ba, Jawi: زاءبا), was a Malaysian writer and linguist. He modernised the Malay language with the publication of a series of grammar books entitled Pelita Bahasa in 1936 at the Sultan Idris Training College. The book contained guidelines in modernising the structure of classical Malay, transforming it into the language that is in use today: the most significant change was the switch from the conventional passive to the modern active form of syntax.

He also devised the Za'aba Spelling system for Malay, which was adopted as the official orthography of Malay in Malaya and successor states Malaysia, Singapore, and Brunei until when it was replaced by the New Rumi Spelling in 1972.

== Biography ==
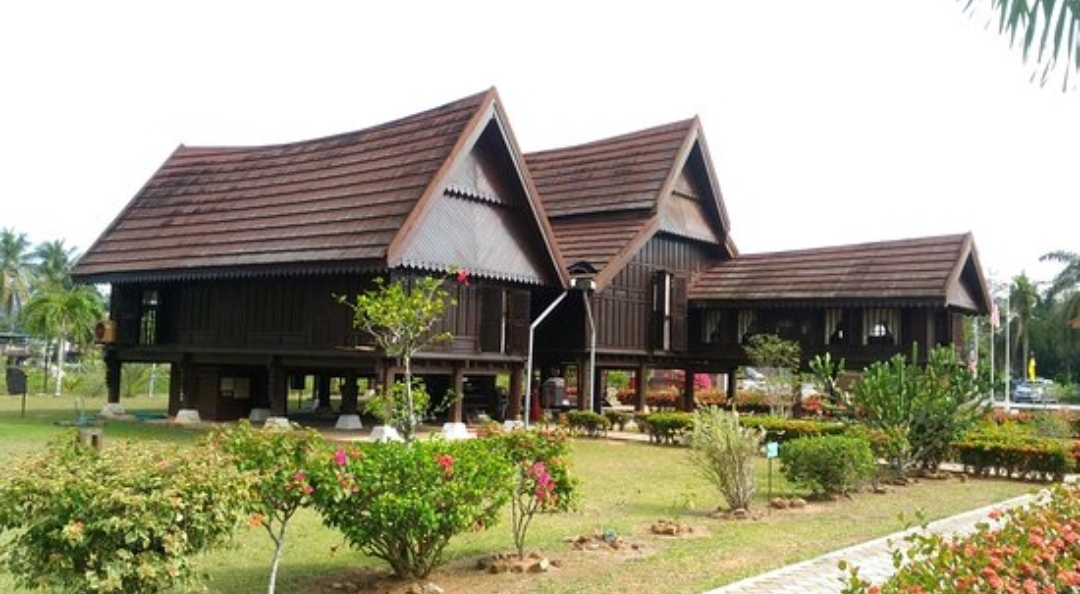
Teratak Za'aba, a museum dedicated to his life in Kampung Bukit Kerdas

Zainal Abidin was born on 16 September 1895 in Kampung Bukit Kerdas, Batu Kikir, Jempol in the state of Negeri Sembilan; the eldest of three children. His mother, Intan Awaluddin (1877–1907) was of Minangkabau descent, while his father Ahmad Ibrahim (1862–1927) was a Buginese from a well-off family in the Riau Islands — the latter being the only literate person in the village. Zainal Abidin, however, learned to read and write by himself from the age of five, practising his writing on young banana leaves with a twig as a stylus. This caught the interest of his father, who decided to buy him a writing slate and some chalk. This further motivated Zainal's affinity for writing and helped to finetune his writing skills later on.

Za'aba initially received his early education at a Malay school in Batu Kikir at the age of 12. His academic excellence allowed him to advance by two grades to Year 3. His father transferred him to a nearby school in Linggi in 1909, in the hopes that his son would become an ulama and learn the fields of Arabic and Islamic jurisprudence, among other things. He then continued his study at St. Paul's Institution, Seremban, becoming the first Malay to take and pass the Senior Cambridge test in 1915.

Za'aba started his career as a teacher at:

- 1916: English College Johore Bahru
- 1918: Malay College Kuala Kangsar
- 1923: Education Department, Kuala Lumpur
- 1924: Maktab Perguruan Sultan Idris, Tanjung Malim
- 1939: Information Department, Singapore until 1942
- 1942: School of Oriental and African Studies, University of London until 1951
- 1954: University of Malaya, Singapore until 1959.

Za'aba loved reading and had a highly commendable talent in writing, with most of his writings published in local newspapers and magazines. He published a series of monographs in regard to the Malay language, including Pelita Bahasa (lit. 'Light of Language') and Ilmu Mengarang Melayu (lit. 'Malay Writing Skills'). His other writings include a compilation of translated Shakespeare works, Cerita-Cerita Shakespeare, that was published by Percetakan Gudang Chap in Singapore.

Za'aba wrote a lot of essays that were social criticisms against the ills affecting contemporary Malay society and against British colonial rule at the time. His hidden hand had a role in the formation of the United Malays National Organisation, a political party that had played an influential role in Malayan and later Malaysian politics as one of the dominant parties in the Alliance coalition (1957–1973) and the succeeding Barisan Nasional (1973–2018).

== Selected works ==
=== Linguistics ===
- Pelita Bahasa Melayu series
  - Pelita Bahasa Melayu (original Jawi edition, 1948, Malaya Publishing House).
  - Pelita Bahasa Melayu I (1954, Malaya Publishing House).
  - Pelita Bahasa Melayu II (1957, MacMillan and Co).
  - Pelita Bahasa Melayu III (1958, MacMillan and Co).

=== Anthropology ===
- Bin Ahmad, Zainal-'Abidin (1949). "Malay Festivals: and some aspects of Malay Religious Life". Journal of the Malayan Branch of the Royal Asiatic Society. 22 (1 (147)): 94–106. ISSN 2304-7550. JSTOR 41560498.

=== Histories ===
- Bin Ahmad, Zainal Abidin (1925). "Dato' Paroï, Were-Tiger". Journal of the Malayan Branch of the Royal Asiatic Society. 3 (1 (93)): 74–78. ISSN 2304-7550. JSTOR 41560428.
- Bin Ahmad, Zainal-'Abidin (1951). "Some Malay Legendary Tales". Journal of the Malayan Branch of the Royal Asiatic Society. XXIV (1 (154)): 77–89. ISSN 2304-7550. JSTOR 41502972.
- Bin Ahmad, Zainul-Abidin (1922). "The Grave-Stone of Sultan Mansur Shah of Malacca". Journal of the Straits Branch of the Royal Asiatic Society (86): 386–388. ISSN 2304-7534. JSTOR 41561719.
- Bin Ahmad, Zainal Abidin (1925). "The Origin of Some Malay Place-Names". Journal of the Malayan Branch of the Royal Asiatic Society. 3 (1 (93)): 79–82. ISSN 2304-7550. JSTOR 41560429.

== Award and recognition ==
=== Honour of Malaya ===
- Malaya
  - Commander of the Order of the Defender of the Realm (PMN) – Tan Sri (1962)

=== Places named after him ===
Several places were named after him, including:

- Kolej Pendeta Za'ba, a residential college at Universiti Kebangsaan Malaysia in Bangi, Selangor
- Kolej Pendeta Za'ba, a residential college at Universiti Putra Malaysia in Serdang, Selangor
- Kolej Za'ba, a residential college at Universiti Pendidikan Sultan Idris in Tanjung Malim, Perak
- Za'ba Residential College, a residential college at University of Malaya, Kuala Lumpur
