= Indonesian orthography =

Spelling system of the Indonesian language

Indonesian orthography is the official spelling system used in the Indonesian language. The current system uses the Latin script and is called Ejaan yang Disempurnakan (EYD), commonly translated as Enhanced Spelling, Perfected Spelling or Improved Spelling.

== History ==
The Perfected Spelling system is a system of orthography released in 1972 to replace the existing Republican Spelling System (RSS, also called the Soewandi Spelling System, SSS). A joint initiative of Indonesia and neighbouring country Malaysia (which also introduced the similar Joint Rumi Spelling system), the aim of the change in 1972 was to introduce greater harmonisation of the Indonesian and Malay-language orthographies. The new EYD system, adopted on the 27th anniversary of Indonesia's independence on 17 August 1972, was decreed by President Suharto the previous day. Government departments were instructed to begin using the EYD system on 1 January 1973. On 27 August 1975, the Minister of Education and Culture issued a decree which provided a detailed explanation of the changes in the new system and marked the official use of the EYD system. It was formerly known as the Indonesian Spelling System (Ejaan Bahasa Indonesia, EBI), often referred to as the Indonesian Spelling System General Guidelines (Pedoman Umum Ejaan Bahasa Indonesia, PUEBI), between 2015 and 2022.

== Characteristics ==
=== Republican-to-EYD letter changes ===
Changes	Republican	EYD	English meaning
/tʃ/: tj becomes c	tjuma, katjang	cuma, kacang	only, nut
/dʒ/: dj becomes j	djual, edjaan	jual, ejaan	sell, spelling
/j/: j becomes y	ajam, pajung	ayam, payung	chicken, umbrella
/ɲ/: nj becomes ny	njonja, banjak	nyonya, banyak	madam, many
/ʃ/: sj becomes sy	sjair, masjarakat	syair, masyarakat	poem, people
/x/: ch becomes kh	tarich, achir	tarikh, akhir	era, end

=== Foreign loan letters ===
Letters that had previously been included in the Republican Spelling as foreign loan letters are officially used in the EYD Spelling.

Letters	Example	English meaning
f	maaf, fakir	(I am) sorry, poor
v	vakum, universitas	vacuum/hiatus, university
z	zaman, lezat	age/era, delicious

=== Q and X ===
The letters Q and X are used in scientific subjects, for example, sinar-X (X-ray).

The letter Q is also used as needed for Islamic subjects. Examples include Quran, Al-Furqan, and Al-Baqarah. This letter is also used in some placenames in Indonesia (often derived from the local languages), e.g. the Siluq Ngurai and Sekolaq Darat districts in West Kutai Regency, and Baqa, the capital of Samarinda Seberang, Samarinda (all of these examples are located in East Kalimantan).

=== Affixes and prepositions ===
The writing of di- and ke- (prefixes) can be distinguished from di and ke (prepositions), where di- and ke- are written together with the words that follow them, for example, diambil, kehendak ('taken', 'desire'), while di and ke are written separately from the words that follow them, for example, di rumah, ke pasar ('at home', 'to the market'). This differs from the former Republican Spelling, where both di- and di are written together with the words following them. However, many native speakers often do not follow this orthographic rule and confuse both morphemes (di ambil, dirumah).

Dutch linguist K. Alexander Adelaar viewed that the prefix di- is instead derived from the preposition di, and rejected other etymological theories, such as the prefix coming from the Old Malay prefix ni-.

=== Reduplication ===
Reduplication, mostly used in the plural form of words, has to be fully written with letters, so the use of a superscripted number 2, as in the Republican Spelling, is no longer valid. The practice remains common in informal usage such as in text messaging.

Republican	EYD	English meaning
anak^{2}	anak-anak	children
ber-main^{2}	bermain-main	playing around
ke-barat^{2}-an	kebarat-baratan	westernish

== Exceptions ==
Exceptions mostly come from proper nouns. Many personal names, particularly of younger people, do not follow the orthographic rules (see Indonesian names). Common spelling variations include doubled letters, a silent h following consonants, the use of Dutch digraphs (which stems from Van Ophuijsen spelling), and other eccentric letters. However, a few variations come from other parts of speech, such as mag ('gastritis'), which is actually pronounced as [max] or even [mah], deriving from Dutch maag; and bus, pronounced as [bəs] or [bɪs], also from Dutch bus.

== Changes after 1975 ==
On 9 September 1987, the Minister of Education and Culture issued a ministerial decree which updated the previous spelling system and remained valid for 22 years.

On 31 July 2009, the Minister of National Education issued a decree outlining further changes. The update included an optional diacritic for ⟨e⟩, to distinguish ⟨é⟩ [e] and ⟨e⟩ [ə].

On 26 November 2015, the Minister of Education and Culture issued a ministerial regulation about the spelling system. For the first time, the term Indonesian Spelling System (Ejaan Bahasa Indonesia) was used. There were only minor changes compared to previous updates, including the addition of a new diphthong of ⟨ei⟩ (previously there were only 3 diphthongs, ai, au and oi), optional diacritics for ⟨e⟩ as ⟨é⟩ [e], ⟨è⟩ [ɛ], and ⟨ê⟩ [ə], and new rules on the usage of bold letters (abolition of bold letters for lemma entries in its dictionary).

On 16 August 2022, in time for the spelling system's 50th anniversary, a new update was issued. It restored the term Perfected Spelling of the Indonesian Language (Ejaan Bahasa Indonesia yang Disempurnakan). Like the previous update, it also introduced minor changes: among others, it introduced a new monophthong ⟨eu⟩ [ɘ] which mostly used in loanwords from Acehnese and Sundanese, reaffirmed the use of the optional diacritic ⟨ê⟩ [ə], and limited the use of number words to singular numbers.

== See also ==
- New Rumi Spelling
- Republican Spelling System
- Van Ophuijsen Spelling System
