= Hazami Jahari =

- حزامي جهاري
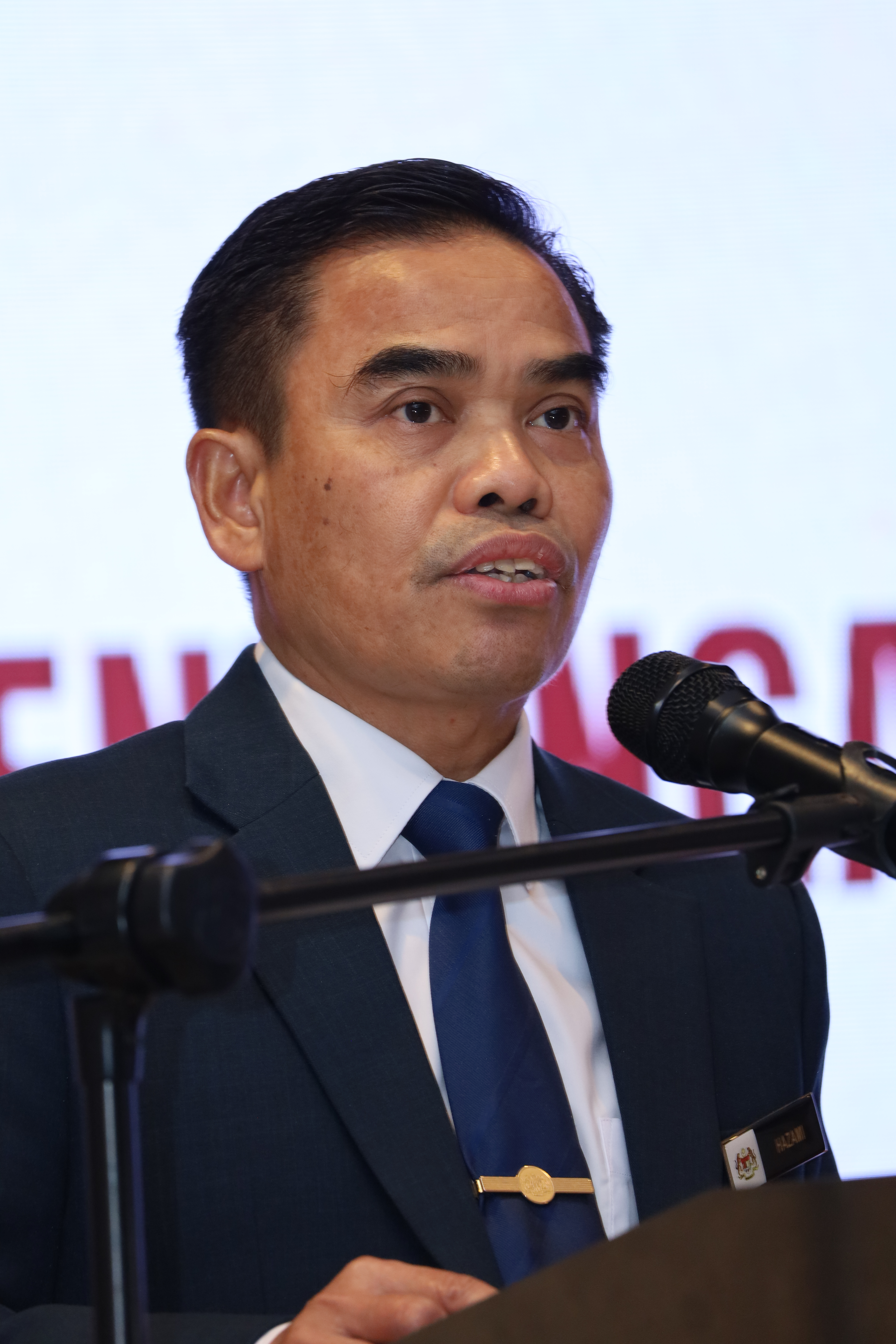
- Hazami in 2025
- Born: Hazami bin Jahari
- Citizenship: Malaysia
- Education: University of Malaya; Universiti Sains Malaysia
- Organization: Dewan Bahasa dan Pustaka
- Known for: Linguist

Hazami bin Jahari (Jawi: حزامي بن جهاري) is a Malaysian linguist who has served as the Director General of Dewan Bahasa dan Pustaka (DBP) since 2023.

== Early life ==
Hazami was born in 1968 in Kuching, Sarawak. He studied at the University of Malaya during the late 1980s for his Bachelor's Degree in Arts (Creative and Descriptive Writing). He furthered his education for his Master's Degree in the same field and institution, before going to the Science University of Malaysia for his PhD in Literature.

== Career ==
He began working at Dewan Bahasa dan Pustaka in 1992 and has since been active in organising programmes to uphold and preserve the Malay language as the national language of Malaysia, as well as in the development, expansion, and publication of the Malay language.

In 2014, he led the Sarawak chapter of DBP, before being appointed as Director of the Language and Literature Building Department and later the Language and Literature Development Department.

He assumed the role of Director of Policy and Research Department in 2021.

Hazami was appointed as the Director General of Dewan Bahasa dan Pustaka on 18 January 2023 by the Minister of Education, Fadhlina Sidek.
