= Borneo Literature Bureau =

Agency overview
- Formed: 15 September 1958
- Dissolved: c. 1977
- Superseding agency: Dewan Bahasa dan Pustaka (DBP)
- Type: Encourage local authorship and local book trade
- Jurisdiction: Sarawak and Sabah
- Headquarters: Kuching, Sarawak
- Agency executives: Douglas Pearce (1959–1965), Director; Leo Moggie (1966–1967), Director; Edward Enggu (1967–1976), Director

Borneo Literature Bureau (BLB) (15 September 1958 to c. 1977) was a government agency sponsored by the Crown Colony of Sarawak in local literature publishing and supporting the government release of documentation to indigenous people in Sarawak and Sabah. The bureau publishes principally in English, Iban, Chinese and Malay languages, followed by other indigenous languages.

== History ==
Borneo Literature Bureau was set up by the colonial officials of Sarawak on 15 September 1958. BLB headquarters in Kuching started construction in October 1960 and was completed in May 1962.

The initial aims of the establishment of BLB were: to encourage local authorship, build up the local book trade, and assist the government departments in publishing technical, semi-technical, and instructional documents. BLB started to organise literature competition every year starting from 1960.

After the formation of Malaysia, BLB magazines included stories and pictures from Peninsular Malaysia and created a section dedicated to the Malay language. In 1970, BLB included the new objective of promoting the use of the Malay language. In January 1972, BLB open a branch office at Jalan Maktab, Kota Kinabalu, Sabah. By 1976, there were only four employees in the Kota Kinabalu office.

== Administration ==
Mr Douglas Pearce was the first director of BLB from 1959 to 1965. He was succeeded by Mr Leo Moggie from 1966 to 1967. Mr Edward Enggu was the last director of BLB from 1967 to 1976. BLB had four departments, namely administration, publishing, production and distribution departments.

Organisation chart of Borneo Literature Bureau

Director
Administration | Publishing | Production | Distribution
Administration assistant | Editorial Officer | Production officer | Assistant Business Officer | Sabah Mobile Showroom, General Clerical Duties etc.
Driver | Storekeeper
General clerical duties Acc, etc. | General clerical duties, typing etc | Assistant editorial officer | Artist | Production assistant | Clerk | Supervisor
Clerk | Telephonist/Typist | Clerk/Typist | Clerk/storekeeper
Clerk/Typist | Stenographer/Shorthand typing | Assistant Artist
Office boy | Despatch, Shipping etc.
Watchman
Storekeeper

== Business model ==
BLB works as a publisher and book wholesaler. BLB sourced its materials from literature competitions, literary agents, and research. It also hires book authors, translators, and illustrators. Manuscripts are then sent to the printer. BLB also purchases books from other commercial publishers. Printed books are distributed through direct mail (to domestic or foreign markets), subscription sales, mobile showrooms, book clubs, retail booksellers, and school libraries.

== Publications ==
=== Books ===
From 1960, Borneo Literature Bureau (BLB) started systematic publishing and printing of literature books in Sarawak. Genres of books include folklore, short stories, poetry and novels. BLB published 577 books in various languages from 1960 to 1976. A total of 271 (58%) books were in English, 125 (30%) books in Iban language, 99 (15%) books in Chinese, 53 (8%) books in Malay, and 29 books in other languages. From 1962, BLB started to use offset printing for book publications.

In 1961, an Iban book named Rita Tujoh Malam authored by Anthony Richards was sold for 1,765 copies. A religious text named Jerita pasal Daniel was also published in the same year. In 1962, Benedict Sandin's Duabelas bengkah Mimpi Tuai Dayak-Iban was published, which recorded dreams from Iban chiefs that had historical significance. In 1964, Dilah Tanah, the first Iban novel, written by Andria Ejau was published. In 1968, Janang Ensiring published his poem named Ngelar Menoa Sarawak which showed great love for Sarawak and the five-year-old Malaysia.

Publications of books according to languages from 1960 to 1976
| Year | English | Iban | Chinese | Malay | Others | Total |
|---|---|---|---|---|---|---|
| 1960 | 6 | 2 | 1 | 1 | - | 10 |
| 1961 | 15 | 2 | 11 | 2 | 7 | 37 |
| 1962 | 21 | 6 | 12 | 1 | 1 | 41 |
| 1963 | 18 | 8 | 9 | 2 | 1 | 38 |
| 1964 | 30 | 8 | 2 | 3 | - | 43 |
| 1965 | 20 | 14 | 4 | - | 1 | 39 |
| 1966 | 18 | 7 | 7 | 4 | 2 | 38 |
| 1967 | 34 | 26 | - | 6 | - | 66 |
| 1968 | 33 | 11 | 6 | 1 | 5 | 56 |
| 1969 | 16 | 3 | 2 | 5 | 3 | 29 |
| 1970 | 16 | 9 | 2 | 6 | 3 | 36 |
| 1971 | 10 | 10 | 5 | 4 | 2 | 31 |
| 1972 | 11 | 7 | 3 | 2 | 1 | 24 |
| 1973 | 6 | - | 6 | 2 | 1 | 15 |
| 1974 | 5 | 2 | 2 | 5 | - | 14 |
| 1975 | 3 | 5 | 11 | 3 | - | 22 |
| 1976 | 9 | 5 | 16 | 6 | 2 | 38 |
| Total | 271 | 125 | 99 | 53 | 29 | 577 |

Titles published by BLB
| Year | New title | Reprint | New edition |
|---|---|---|---|
| 1960 | 8 | - | - |
| 1961 | 35 | 1 | - |
| 1962 | 23 | 18 | - |
| 1963 | 32 | 5 | - |
| 1964 | 22 | 20 | - |
| 1965 | 28 | 8 | - |
| 1966 | 22 | 15 | 1 |
| 1967 | 37 | 27 | 2 |
| 1968 | 30 | 20 | 6 |
| 1969 | 19 | 5 | 5 |
| 1970 | 23 | 13 | - |
| 1971 | 23 | 8 | - |
| 1972 | 17 | 7 | - |
| 1973 | 9 | 6 | - |
| 1974 | 11 | 3 | - |
| 1975 | 14 | 8 | - |
| 1976 | 29 | 9 | - |

Total book sales
| Year | Total |
|---|---|
| 1964 | 20,843 |
| 1965 | 32,660 |
| 1966 | 29,240 |
| 1967 | - |
| 1968 | - |
| 1969 | 19,197 |
| 1970 | 21,221 |
| 1971 | 17,859 |
| 1972 | - |
| 1973 | - |
| 1974 | - |
| 1975 | - |
| 1976 | - |

=== Magazines ===
BLB also published magazines in several languages such as English Dolphin magazine (started in July 1960), Chinese Dolphin magazine (started in November 1960), Iban Nendak magazine (started in April 1967), and in Malay language as Perintis magazine (started in June 1970). However, the Dolphin magazine catered to the general audience. Therefore, in 1974, the Pelita Pelajar magazine, which was a continuation of the Dolphin magazine, was established which catered specifically to children.In 1962, BLB sold 120,094 English magazines and 33,900 Chinese magazines. In 1970, the Perintis magazine sold 16,973 copies. In 1976, BLB sold 40,815 English magazines, 166,130 Chinese magazines, 18,086 Iban magazines and 74,149 Malay magazines. BLB magazines introduced local stories, cultures of different races, folk tales, historical figures, Borneo tropical rainforests, animals, and plants.

== Finances ==
In 1960, the Sabah and Sarawak governments gave $140,000 and $28,000 to BLB marketing unit. In 1965, BLB publication fund received $115,000 from the Sarawak government. In 1966, BLB fully utilised the distribution fund in which Papua New Guinea order 1,000 books for each of the 13 titles of BLB books, totalling 13,000 books. This is the first and only large book order from a foreign country. In 1965, BLB received from The Asia Foundation, Sarawak and Sabah governments $140,000, $69,000 and $46,000 respectively, totalling $255,000 for its publication fund.

Gross profit from book sales
| Year | Total ($) |
|---|---|
| 1961 | 172,157.53 |
| 1962 | 116,611.17 |
| 1963 | 348,528.43 |
| 1964 | 128,209.03 |
| 1965 | 381,249.05 |
| 1966 | 400,262.29 |
| 1967 | 465,758.18 |
| 1968 | 315,733.78 |
| 1969 | 324,849.78 |
| 1970 | 321,045.63 |
| 1971 | 269,429.27 |
| 1972 | 314,034.43 |
| 1973 | 297,611.29 |
| 1974 | 311,799.72 |
| 1975 | 400,362.22 |
| 1976 | 337,499.89 |

== Absorption into Dewan Bahasa dan Pustaka (DBP) ==
In April 1972, the government of Sarawak invited the director-general of Dewan Bahasa dan Pustaka (DBP), Tuan Haji Sujak bin Rahman to visit the BLB. Haji Sujak discussed with several officials during that visit for closer liaison between the two organisations. An arrangement was made for one of the BLB's Assistant Editorial Officers to be attached at the DBP in May 1972. On 18 October 1976, a delegation led by Federal Deputy Works Minister Abdullah Majid arrived in Kuching to sort out the combination of DBP and BLB. The final settlement was the total absorption of BLB properties and staff into DBP by "lock, stock, and barrel". BLB staff were given a choice to either join DBP or resign to look for a new job. Sarawak branch of DBP was formally established on 1 January 1977 and BLB ceased to exist after that.

== Aftermath ==
In 1990, Otto Steinmayer published a bibliography of BLB books in Iban and other Bornean languages which was compiled from catalogues and annual reports of BLB, books inspection in DBP Kuching branch, Sarawak Museum, University of Malaya, Kuching public library and private collections.

Since 2022, several groups had called for the revival of BLB.

In 2024, Abang Haliman Haji Abang Julai, the director of the Sarawak branch of DBP stated that the implicit motive of colonists to set up BLB remained a mystery and requires further research.
