= Malaccan Malay =

Malayic language

- Bahasa Melayu Melaka بهاس ملايو ملاک
- Loghat Melaka
- Pronunciation: [loɣat məlakə]
- Native to: Malaysia
- Region: Malacca, western Selangor (south of the Selangor River until Kuala Langat)
- Native speakers: Unknown (under tag 'zlm')
- Language family: Austronesian: Malayo-Polynesian; Malayic; Malaccan Malay
- Dialects: Malacca City; Western Selangor

Language codes
- ISO 639-3: zlm
- Glottolog: mela1261

Malaccan Malay (Loghat Melaka, lit. 'Dialect of Malacca'; Malay: Bahasa Melayu Melaka; Jawi: بهاس ملايو ملاک) is a Malayic language spoken in the Malaysian states of Malacca and less prominently in western Selangor. In Malacca, it is mainly spoken in Malacca City and in the areas surrounding it, while in western Selangor, it is spoken from south of the Selangor River until the district of Kuala Langat, although migration of people of different linguistic backgrounds into the area have made it less prevalent in Selangor.

In between these two areas where Malaccan Malay is spoken, a vastly different dialect of Malay is spoken, Negeri Sembilan Malay. Spoken mainly in the state of Negeri Sembilan and also in some parts of Malacca (mainly in Alor Gajah) and Selangor, this dialect arose as a result of significant Minangkabau migration into these areas starting as early as the 14th century. The emergence of this dialect is believed to be what split the Malaccan Malay dialect into two separate unconnected dialect areas instead of forming one continuous dialect chain.

== Phonology ==
=== Consonants ===
The consonant inventory of Malaccan Malay consists of 19 consonants.

		Labial	Denti-alv./ Alveolar	Post-alv./ Palatal	Velar	Glottal
Nasal		m	n	ɲ	ŋ	
Plosive/ Affricate	voiceless	p	t	t͡ʃ	k	ʔ
Plosive/ Affricate	voiced	b	d	d͡ʒ	ɡ	
Fricative	voiceless		s			h
Fricative	voiced				ɣ	
Approximant			l	j	w	

Notes:

- Prevocalic and intervocalic /r/ in Standard Malay correspond to /ɣ/ in Malaccan Malay.
- The /ar/ sequence of Standard Malay corresponds to /aw/ in Malaccan Malay, so kejar 'to chase' and lapar 'hungry' would be pronounced as kejau /kəd͡ʒaw/ and lapau /lapaw/ in Malaccan Malay instead of as /kəd͡ʒa(r)/ and /lapa(r)/ as in Standard Malay. According to Asmah (2015), this was caused by the elision of the /r/ and the subsequent diphthongization of the vowel /a/ to /aw/. Another analysis posits that the /r/ instead was simply replaced by the consonant /w/.
- In western Selangor, prevocalic and postvocalic /h/ are elided, causing hitam 'black' and tujuh 'seven' to be pronounced as tujo /tud͡ʒo/ and itam /itam/.

=== Vowels ===
The vowel inventory and distribution of Malaccan Malay is largely identical to that of schwa-variety Standard Malay pronunciation. This means word-final ⟨a⟩ as in luka 'scar' would be pronounced as schwa /ə/ and closed syllable-final ⟨i⟩ and ⟨u⟩ as in pelik 'weird' and masuk 'to enter' would be pronounced as /e/ and /o/ as in schwa-variety speech.

The only instance in which Malaccan Malay's vowel distribution differs from that of schwa-variety speech is with the /aw/ diphthong which, in Malaccan Malay, also occurs in places that would have /ar/ in Standard Malay (e.g. Malaccan Malay ulau /ulaw/ 'snake' ≙ Standard Malay ular /ular/).

Monophthongs of Malaccan Malay
	Front	Central	Back
Close	i		u
Mid	e	ə	o
Open		a	

Diphthongs of Malaccan Malay
Coda	/j/	/w/
/a/	/aj/	/aw/
/o/	/oj/	

== Vocabulary ==
Malaccan Malay contains a number of unique words not found or typically used in Standard Malay. Below is a non-exhaustive list of such words along with their Standard Malay equivalents:

Vocabulary Comparison
	Malaccan Malay	Standard Malay	English meaning
1	koweng	comot	smeared
2	gebau	selimut	blanket
3	gobok	almari	wardrobe
4	kepau	sepah	messy
5	kensal	tuala	towel
