= Malay orthography =

Writing systems used in Malaysia and Indonesia

The modern Malay and Indonesian alphabet (Brunei, Malaysia and Singapore: Tulisan Rumi, lit. 'Roman script / Roman writing', Indonesian: Aksara Latin, lit. 'Latin script') consists of the 26 letters of the ISO basic Latin alphabet. It is the more common of the two alphabets used today to write the Malay language, the other being Jawi (a modified Arabic script). The Latin Malay alphabet is the official Malay script in Indonesia (as Indonesian), Malaysia (also called Malaysian) and Singapore, while it is co-official with Jawi in Brunei.

Historically, various scripts such as Pallava, Kawi and Rencong or Surat Ulu were used to write Old Malay, until they were replaced by Jawi during Islamic missionary missions in the Malay Archipelago.

The arrival of European colonial powers brought the Latin alphabet to the Malay Archipelago. As the Malay-speaking countries were divided between two colonial administrations (the Dutch and the British), two major different spelling orthographies were developed in the Dutch East Indies and British Malaya respectively, influenced by the orthographies of their respective colonial tongues. The Van Ophuijsen Spelling System used in the Dutch East Indies and later Indonesia was based on the Dutch alphabet. It was replaced by the simpler Republican Spelling System in 1947.

In 1972, as part of the effort of harmonizing spelling differences between the two countries, Indonesia and Malaysia each adopted a spelling reform plan, called the Perfected Spelling System (Ejaan Yang Disempurnakan) in Indonesia and the New Rumi Spelling (Ejaan Rumi Baharu) in Malaysia.

Although the representations of speech sounds are now largely identical in Indonesian and other neighbouring Malay varieties, a number of minor spelling differences remain.

== Letter names and pronunciations ==
Enhanced Indonesian Spelling System (Indonesian: Ejaan Yang Disempurnakan, abbreviated as EYD), New Rumi Spelling (Malay: Ejaan Rumi Baharu).

Indonesian/Malay Latin alphabet
Number	1	2	3	4	5	6	7	8	9	10	11	12	13	14	15	16	17	18	19	20	21	22	23	24	25	26
Upper case	A	B	C	D	E	F	G	H	I	J	K	L	M	N	O	P	Q	R	S	T	U	V	W	X	Y	Z
Lower case	a	b	c	d	e	f	g	h	i	j	k	l	m	n	o	p	q	r	s	t	u	v	w	x	y	z

The Malay alphabet has a phonemic orthography; words are spelled the way they are pronounced, with a notable defectiveness: /ə/ and /e/ are both written as E/e. The names of the letters, however, differ between Indonesia and rest of the Malay-speaking countries; while Malaysia, Brunei and Singapore follow the letter names of the English alphabet, Indonesia largely follows the letter names of the Dutch alphabet, making its implementation more faithful to the actual phonemic values of each letter. The letters otherwise represent the same sounds in all Malay-speaking countries.

The letters F, Q, V, X and Z are not used in spelling native Malay/Indonesian words, the letters F and Z is also exclusively used in proper names only, e.g. Rizki or Fakfak. F and Z occur in loanwords from Arabic (e. g. fatah 'conquest, opening', zaman 'era, period, time') and from European languages (e. g. faktor 'factor', zoologi 'zoology'). V is used in loanwords from European languages (e. g. visa 'visa', provinsi 'province'). The letter Q is very rare: it is used for Arabic ﻕ in some loanwords, particularly related to religion: Qur'an, Al-Qur'an (spelling these words with the apostrophe is recommended by the Indonesian Ministry of Religion, the variants Quran and Alquran are deprecated; Malaysia uses Quran, Al-Quran), qari/qariah 'male/female Quran reader', qanun 'law established by Muslim sovereigns or by Aceh autonomous provincial government' (also qanun (instrument)). But many loanwords from Arabic words with ﻕ use k instead: makam 'tomb', mutlak 'absolute, complete'. Some words are spelled with q in Malaysia but with k in Indonesia: qasidah/kasidah 'qasida'. European loanwords use the letter k instead of q: kualiti (Malaysian)/kualitas (Indonesian) 'quality', frekuensi 'frequency'. The letter X is also very rare: it is used at the beginning of loanwords, e. g. xilofon 'xylophone', but replaced by ks at the middle and at the end of loanwords: taksi 'taxi', lateks 'latex', teks 'text' (some consonant clusters are regularly simplified at the end of loanwords: -st>-s, -nt>-n, -kt>-k).

Letter	Name (in IPA)		Sound		
Letter	Standard Indonesian	Malaysia, Brunei and Singapore	IPA		English equivalent
Letter	Standard Indonesian	Malaysia, Brunei and Singapore	Malaysia, Brunei, Singapore	Standard Indonesian	English equivalent
Aa	a (/a/)	e (/e/)	/a/		a as in father
Aa	a (/a/)	e (/e/)	/ə/ ~ /a/	-	a as in sofa
Bb	bé (/be/)	bi (/bi/)	/b/		b as in bed
Cc	cé (/t͡ʃe/)	si (/si/)	/t͡ʃ/		ch as in check
Dd	dé (/de/)	di (/di/)	/d/		d as in day
Ee	é (/e/)	i (/i/)	/ə/		e as in tolerant
Ee	é (/e/)	i (/i/)	/e/		e as in hey
Ee	é (/e/)	i (/i/)	/ɛ/		e as in get
Ff	éf (/ef/)		/f/		f as in effort
Gg	gé (/ge/)	ji (/d͡ʒi/)	/ɡ/		g as in gain
Hh	ha (/ha/)	héc (/het͡ʃ/, /heʃ/)	/h/		h as in harm
Ii	i (/i/)	ay (/aj/)	/i/		i as in machine, but shorter
Ii	i (/i/)	ay (/aj/)	/e/	/ɪ/	i as in igloo
Jj	jé (/d͡ʒe/)		/d͡ʒ/		j as in jam
Kk	ka (/ka/)	ké (/ke/)	/k/		unaspirated k as in skate
Ll	él (/el/)		/l/		l as in let
Mm	ém (/em/)		/m/		m as in mall
Nn	én (/en/)		/n/		n as in net
Oo	o (/o/)		/o/		o as in owe
Oo	o (/o/)		/ɔ/		o as in bought, but shorter
Pp	pé (/pe/)	pi (/pi/)	/p/		unaspirated p as in speak
Qq	ki (/ki/)	kiu (/kiu/ or /kju/)	/q/ ~ /k/	/k/	q as in Qatar
Rr	ér (/er/)	ar (/ar/ or /a:/)	/r/		Spanish rr as in puerro
Ss	és (/es/)		/s/		s as in sun
Tt	té (/te/)	ti (/ti/)	/t/		unaspirated t as in still
Uu	u (/u/)	yu (/ju/)	/u/		u as in rule, but shorter
Uu	u (/u/)	yu (/ju/)	/o/	/ʊ/	oo as in foot
Vv	fé (/fe/)	vi (/vi/)	/v/ ~ /f/	/f/	v as in van
Ww	wé (/we/)	dabel yu (/dabəlˈju/)	/w/		w as in wet
Xx	éks (/eks/)		/ks/		x as in box
Xx	éks (/eks/)		/z/	/s/	x as in xenon
Yy	yé (/je/)	way (/wai̯/)	/j/		y as in yarn
Zz	zét (/zet/)	zed (/zed/)	/z/		z as in zebra

* Many vowels are pronounced (and were formerly spelt) differently in Peninsular Malaysia and Sumatra (where Malay is native): tujuh is pronounced (and was spelt) tujoh, rambut as rambot, kain as kaen, pilih as pileh, etc., [e] and [o] are also allophones of /i/ and /u/ in closed final syllables in peninsular Malaysian and Sumatran. Many vowels were pronounced and formerly spelt differently that way also in East Malaysia, Brunei, and Indonesia.

In addition, there are digraphs that are not considered separate letters of the alphabet:

Digraph	Sound		
Digraph	IPA		Notes
Digraph	Malaysia, Brunei and Singapore	Indonesia	Notes
ai	/ai̯/		uy as in buy (ui)
au	/au̯/		ou as in ouch (ou)
ei	/ei̯/		ei as in survey
oi	/oi̯/		oy as in boy
eu	-	/ɘ/	In loanwords from Sundanese and Acehnese
gh	/ɣ/ ~ /x/	-	similar to Dutch and German ch, but voiced
kh	/x/		ch as in loch
ng	/ŋ/		ng as in sing
ny	/ɲ/		Spanish ñ; similar to ny as in canyon with a nasal sound
sy	/ʃ/		sh as in shoe

== Previous spelling systems ==
=== Pre-1972 British Malaya and Borneo/Brunei, Malaysia and Singapore orthography ===
Malaysia, Brunei and Singapore: 1927 Za'aba Spelling system
Upper case	A	Ă	B	C	D	E	Ĕ	F	G	H	I	J	K	L	M	N	O	P	Q	R	S	T	U	V	W	X	Y	Z
Lower case	a	ă	b	c	d	e	ĕ	f	g	h	i	j	k	l	m	n	o	p	q	r	s	t	u	v	w	x	y	z

=== Pre-1972 Dutch East Indies/Indonesia orthography ===
Indonesia: 1901 Van Ophuijsen Spelling System and 1947 Soewandi Spelling System
Upper case	A	B	C	D	E	Ē (pre-1947)	É	F	G	H	I	J	K	L	M	N	O	P	Q	R	S	T	Oe (1901)/U (1947)	V	W	X	Y	Z
Lower case	a	b	c	d	e	ē (pre-1947)	é	f	g	h	i	j	k	l	m	n	o	p	q	r	s	t	oe (1901)/u (1947)	v	w	x	y	z

==== Comparison table ====
Sound	Letter(s)			
Sound	1927 Za'aba (Malaysia, Brunei, Singapore)	1901 Van Ophuijsen, 1947 Soewandi (Indonesia)	1901 Wilkinson (Malaysia, Brunei, Singapore)	Post-1972 replacement (Malaysia, Brunei, Singapore, Indonesia)
/t͡ʃ/	ch (Note: The letter j and the digraph ch used to represent different sounds across the two spelling systems.)	tj	ch	c
/ð/	dh, dz	-	dz	d, z
/ə/	ă, ĕ	e	ĕ	e
/e/	e	é (pre-1947), e	e	
/i/ (monophthong)	i	ï (pre-1947), i	i	
/d͡ʒ/	j	dj	j	
/x/	kh	ch	kh	
/ɲ/	ny	nj	ny	
/θ/	th	-	th	s
/ʃ/	sh	sj	sh	sy
/u/	u	oe (pre-1947), u	u	
/j/	y	j	y	

== See also ==
- Jawi alphabet
- Congress Spelling System
- Javanese orthography
