= Malay phonology =

Sounds and pronunciation of Malay including Indonesian

Malay phonology is based on the pronunciation of several standard varieties of the pluricentric language of Malay as used officially as Standard Malay in Brunei, Malaysia, (Note: Also commonly called bahasa Malaysia (lit. 'Malaysian language') in Malaysia, although its English equivalent, "Malaysian", is less commonly used in English discourse among Malaysians.) and Singapore, and as Indonesian in Indonesia and Timor-Leste.

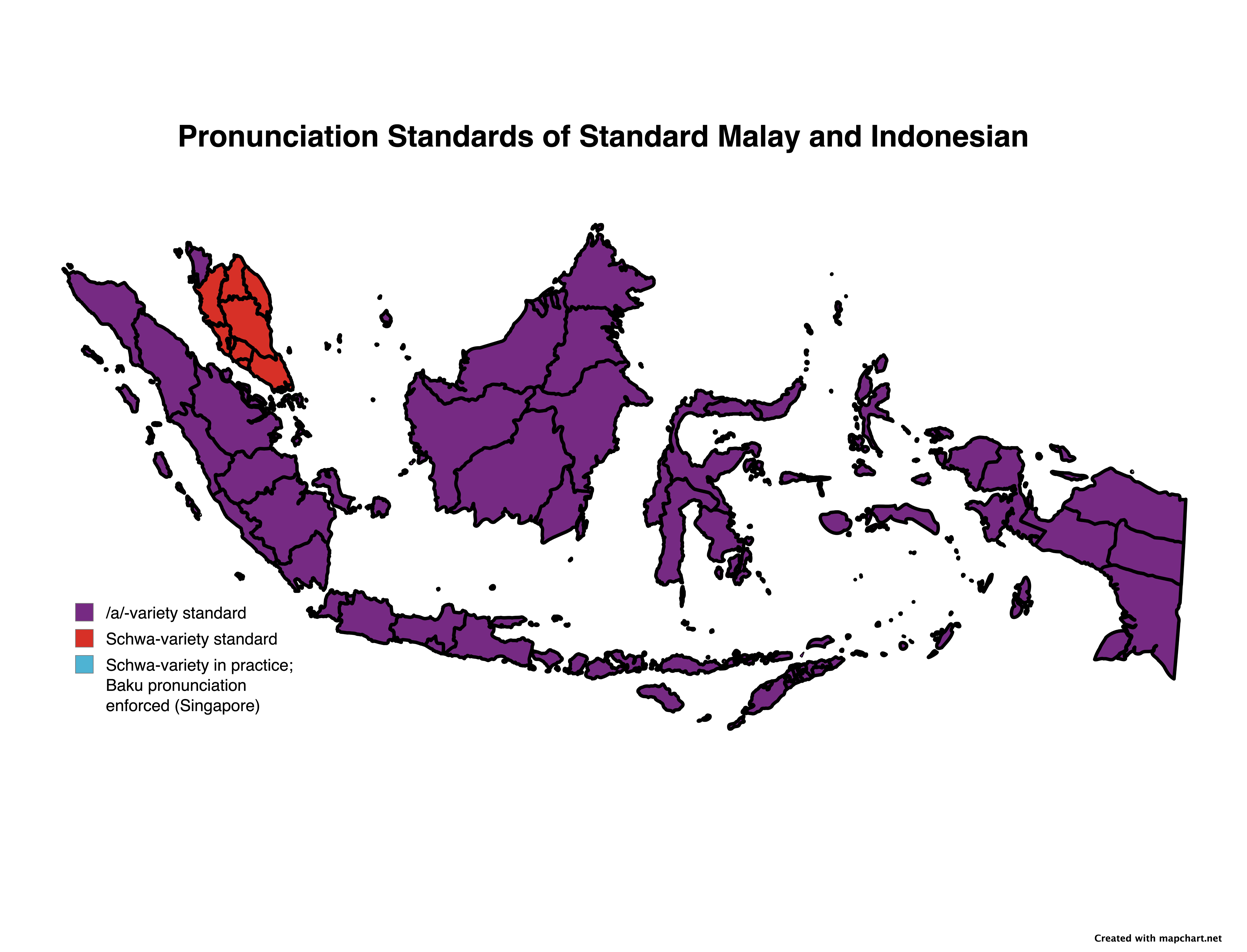
Distribution of the pronunciation standards of Standard Malay and standard Indonesian.

There are two main varieties of standard Malay pronunciation, /a/-varieties (kelainan-/a/) where word-final ⟨a⟩ as in the word buka 'to open' is pronounced as /a/ and word-final ⟨r⟩ as in the word sabar 'patient' is not silent, and schwa-varieties (kelainan-pepet; also called 'Johor-Riau pronunciation' owing to its origins) where word-final ⟨a⟩ is pronounced as schwa /ə/ and word-final ⟨r⟩ is silent except when a vowel-initial suffix is attached. This means buka and sabar would be pronounced as /buka/ and /sabar/ in /a/-varieties, but as /bukə/ and /saba(r)/ in schwa-varieties.

/a/-varieties are spoken in Brunei, East Malaysia, Indonesia, and northwestern Peninsular Malaysia (Kedah, Penang, Perlis), while schwa-varieties are spoken in the other parts of Peninsular Malaysia, including the Malaysian capital, Kuala Lumpur and in Singapore. Schwa-varieties predominate in the Malaysian media, while a separate artificial Baku (lit. 'standard' in Malay/Indonesian; also called 'Literary Standard Malay') pronunciation standard which follows a prescriptive 'pronounce as spelt' approach to pronunciation is officially used and enforced in Singapore. The Baku pronunciation standard is distinct from /a/-varieties but aligns with them in how word-final ⟨a⟩ and ⟨r⟩ are treated.

== Consonants ==
The consonants of Standard Bruneian Malay, Malaysian Malay and Indonesian are shown below. Non-native consonants that only occur in borrowed words, principally from Arabic, Dutch, English and Sanskrit, are shown in parentheses. Some analyses list 19 "primary consonants" for Malay as the 18 symbols that are not in parentheses in the table as well as the glottal stop [ʔ].

Consonant phonemes of Standard Malay and Indonesian
		Labial	Dental	Denti-alv./ Alveolar	Post-alv./ Palatal	Velar	Uvular	Glottal
Nasal		m		n	ɲ	ŋ		
Plosive/ Affricate	voiceless	p		t	t͡ʃ	k	(q)	(ʔ)
Plosive/ Affricate	voiced	b		d	d͡ʒ	ɡ		
Fricative	voiceless	(f)	(θ)	s	(ʃ)	(x)		h
Fricative	voiced	(v)	(ð)	(z)		(ɣ)		
Approximant				l	j	w		
Trill				r				

Orthographic note: The sounds are represented orthographically by their symbols as above, except:

- /ɲ/ is written as ⟨ny⟩ before a vowel and as ⟨n⟩ before ⟨c⟩ and ⟨j⟩.
- /ŋ/ is written as ⟨ng⟩.
- /ʔ/ is written as syllable-final ⟨k⟩ or an apostrophe ⟨'⟩.
- /tʃ/ is written as ⟨c⟩.
  - Before 1972, this sound was written as ⟨ch⟩ in Standard Malay and as ⟨tj⟩ in Indonesian.
- /dʒ/ is written as ⟨j⟩.
  - Before 1972, this sound was written as ⟨dj⟩ in Indonesian.
- /j/ is written as ⟨y⟩.
  - Before 1972, this sound was written as ⟨j⟩ in Indonesian.
- /ʃ/ is written as ⟨sy⟩.
  - Before 1972, this sound was written as ⟨sh⟩ in Standard Malay and as ⟨sj⟩ in Indonesian.
- /x/ is written as ⟨kh⟩.
  - Before 1972, this sound was written as ⟨ch⟩ in Indonesian.
- /ɣ/ is written as ⟨gh⟩.
  - This digraph corresponds to ⟨g⟩ in Indonesian.
- /q/ is written as ⟨k⟩ or ⟨q⟩.
- /ð/ is written as ⟨z⟩.
  - Before 1972, this sound was written as ⟨dh⟩ or ⟨dz⟩ in Standard Malay.
- /θ/ is written ⟨s⟩.
  - Before 1972, this sound was written as ⟨th⟩ or ⟨ts⟩ in Standard Malay.

Notes

- /p/, /t/, /k/ are unaspirated, as in the Romance languages, or as in English spy, sty, sky. In syllable codas, they are usually unreleased, with final /k/ generally being realised as a glottal stop in native words in Malaysian Malay but as velar or uvular stops [k̚ ~ q̚] in Bruneian Standard Malay. There is generally no liaison, that is, no audible release even when followed by a vowel in another word, as in kulit ubi 'tapioca skins' [ˈkulit̚ ˈʔubi], though they are pronounced as a normal medial consonant when followed by a suffix.
- /t/ is dental or supradental [t̪] in most varieties of Malay and in Indonesian, but not in Brunei Malay where it is alveolar.
- At prefix-stem boundaries, when the prefix ends in a vowel (e.g. ke- and di-) and the stem word starts with a vowel, a glottal stop [ʔ] is epenthesized as a way of avoiding vowel hiatus, so a word like diangkat 'to be lifted' (< di- + angkat 'to lift') would be pronounced as [di.ʔaŋ.kat].
- At stem-suffix boundaries:
  - When the stem ends in /u, i/ and a vowel-initial suffix is added, a homorganic glide, respectively [w, j] is epenthesized between the stem and the suffix. If the stem instead ends in /a/, a glottal stop [ʔ] is inserted. This means rayuan 'complaint' (< rayu 'to send a complaint' + -an) and hentian 'a stop' (< henti 'to stop' + -an) would be pronounced as [ra.ju.wan] and [hən.ti.jan] with the epenthesized [w] and [j], while cubaan 'attempt' (< cuba 'to try' + -an) would be pronounced as [t͡ʃu.ba.ʔan] with the epenthesized [ʔ]. This applies to when the stem ends in the diphthongs /au̯, ai̯, oi̯/ as well so a word like pakaian 'clothes' (< pakai 'to wear' + -an) is pronounced as [pa.kai̯.jan].
  - When the stem ends in any consonant with the exception of /r/ (and also /l/ according to some) and a vowel-initial suffix is added, according to Tajul (2000) and Suraiya (2021), the consonant is geminated. This results in pilihan 'option' (< pilih 'choose' + -an) being pronounced as /pilihhan/ [pi.leh.han ~ pi.lɪh.han]. When the stem ends in /k/ as in tindakan 'action' (< tindak 'act' + -an), the /k/ is phonologically geminated resulting in /tindakkan/, but as /k/ in the syllable coda is pronounced as a glottal stop [ʔ], phonetically, there is no geminate in the derived term, with the word being pronounced as [tin.daʔ.kan].
- The glottal stop /ʔ/ may be represented by an apostrophe in Arabic-derived words such as Al Qur'an. In some words like diangkat 'to be lifted' [di.ʔaŋ.kat] that are derived from vowel-initial words with a vowel-ending prefix, the glottal stop is not reflected in writing.
- For some speakers, /h/ is only pronounced clearly between like vowels, as in dahan 'tree branch'. For these types of speakers, elsewhere, it is a very light sound, and is frequently silent, as in hutan ~ utan 'forest', sahut ~ saut 'answer', indah ~ inda 'beautiful'. The exception to this tendency is initial /h/ from Arabic loans such as hakim 'judge'.
- /r/ varies significantly across dialects. In addition, its position relative to schwa is ambiguous: kertas 'paper' may be pronounced [krəˈtas] or [kərəˈtas]. The trill /r/ is sometimes reduced to a single vibration when single, making it phonetically a flap [ɾ], so that the pronunciation of a single /r/ varies between trill [r], flap [ɾ] and, in some instances, approximant [ɹ], possibly as a result of English influence in Malaysia and Singapore. In word-final position, ⟨r⟩ is audible in /a/-varieties and in the Baku pronunciation standard, but silent in schwa-varieties.
  - In schwa-varieties, word-final ⟨r⟩ is pronounced when a vowel-initial suffix is attached so while cabar (to challenge) may be pronounced as [t͡ʃa.ba] with the ⟨r⟩ silent, when the -an suffix is added to get cabaran 'challenge', the word is pronounced [t͡ʃa.ba.ran] with the ⟨r⟩ not silent. This has led some analyses to refer to the silent word-final ⟨r⟩ as a 'floating /r/' which requires that the pronunciation of cabar in schwa-varieties be phonemically transcribed as /t͡ʃa.ba(r)/ rather than as /t͡ʃa.ba/ to indicate the presence of the floating /r/. This floating /r/ is also found in the prefixes per- /pə(r)/ and ber- /bə(r)/.
  - Due to the influence of Baku pronunciation and spelling, in schwa-varieties, word-final ⟨r⟩ may be pronounced even in situations where it usually isn't. This can be heard, for instance, in the schwa-variety speech of some RTM broadcasters.
- Voiced stops do not occur in final position in native words. In loanwords, /b/ and /d/ are generally devoiced in final position (sebab 'cause' [səˈbap̚], masjid 'mosque' [ˈmasdʒit̚]) to conform with the native phonological structure. Some pronunciation guides consider this devoicing nonstandard and prescribe to pronounce final b and d as written, i.e. voiced.
- /f/, /v/, /z/, /ʃ/, /ð/, /θ/ and /q/ only appear in loanwords. Some speakers pronounce /v/ in loanwords as [v], otherwise it is [f]. [z] can also be an allophone of /s/ before voiced consonants, although this is rare. Since /ð/ and /z/ are written identically in Malay, as with /θ/ and /s/ and /q/ and /k/, /ð/, /θ/ and /q/ tend to only occur in speakers who speak the source languages the words are borrowed from (e.g. Arabic and English) and are aware of the original pronunciations of the words.
- The affricates are variously described as post-alveolar [tʃ]/[dʒ] or alveolo-palatal [tɕ]/[dʑ]. Some varieties are described with palatal [cç]/[ɟʝ].
- Hoogervorst (2017) argues that initial /j/ and /w/ did not exist in Old Malay and were respectively substituted with /dʒ/ and /b/ until the instilling of learning Arabic through eventual spread Islamic education amongst local populations.

Loans from Arabic:

- Phonemes which occur only in Arabic loans may be pronounced distinctly by speakers who know Arabic, otherwise they tend to be substituted with native sounds.

Table of borrowed Arabic consonants
Distinct	Assimilated	Example
/θ/	/s/	Selasa 'Tuesday'
/ð/	/z/	izin 'permission'
/ðˤ/	/z/, /l/	zohor, lohor 'noon prayer'
/dˤ/	/d/, /l/	reda, rela 'willing'
/x/	/k/, /h/	khabar خَبَرْ [ˈkabar ~ ˈhabar], kabar [ˈkabar] 'news'
/ɣ/	/ɡ/ (Indonesian)	logat 'dialect' (compare Malay loghat)
/q/	/k/	makam 'grave'
/ħ/	/h/	hakim حَاكِم [hakim] 'judge'
/ʕ/	/ʔ/	saat سَاعَة [sa.ʔat] 'second'

=== Nasal assimilation ===
Important in the derivation of Malay verbs and nouns is the assimilation of the nasal consonant at the end of the derivational prefixes meng- /məŋ/, a verbal prefix, and peng- /pəŋ/, a nominal prefix.

The nasal segment is dropped before sonorant consonants (nasals /m, n, ɲ, ŋ/, liquids /l, r/, and approximants /w, j/). It is retained before and assimilates to obstruent consonants: labial /m/ before labial /p, b/, alveolar /n/ before alveolar /t, d/, post-alveolar /ɲ/ before /tʃ, dʒ/ and /s/, velar /ŋ/ before other sounds (velar /k, ɡ/, glottal /h/, all vowels). (Note: This is the argument for the nasal being underlyingly /ŋ/: when there is no place for it to assimilate to, it surfaces as /ŋ/. Some treatments write it /N/ to indicate that it has no place of articulation of its own, but this fails to explain its pronunciation before vowels.)

In addition, following voiceless obstruents, apart from /tʃ/ (that is /p, t, s, k/), are dropped, except when before causative prefix per- where the first consonant is kept. This 'phoneme loss rule' manifests as a consonant mutation, often mnemonically termed as kaidah KPST ('KPST principle') in Indonesian.

root	meaning	meng- derivation	meaning	peng- derivation	meaning
masak	cook	memasak	cooking	pemasak	cook (n)
nanti	late	menanti	waiting	penanti	one who waits
lawan	fight	melawan	fighting	pelawan	fighter
rampas	confiscated	merampas	snatch	perampas	confiscator
beli	buy	membeli	buying	pembeli	buyer
dukung	support	mendukung	supporting	pendukung	supporter
jawab	answer	menjawab	replying	penjawab	answerer
gulung	roll	menggulung	rolling	penggulung	roller
hantar	send	menghantar	sending	penghantar	sender
ajar	teach	mengajar	teaching	pengajar	teacher
isi	volume	mengisi	filling	pengisi	filler
pilih	choose	memilih	choosing	pemilih	chooser
tulis	write	menulis	writing	penulis	writer
cabut	pull out	mencabut	pulling out	pencabut	puller
kenal	notable	mengenal	knowing (a person)	pengenal	identifier
surat	letter	menyurat	correspond	penyurat	correspondent

== Vowels ==
It is usually said that there are six vowels in Standard Malay and Indonesian. These six vowels are shown in the table below. However, other analyses set up a system with other vowels, particularly the open-mid vowels /ɛ/ and /ɔ/.

Vowel phonemes of Standard Malay and Indonesian
	Front	Central	Back
Close	i		u
Mid	e	ə	o
Open		a	

Notes

- As mentioned at the top of the page, one main source of variation in standard Malay pronunciation is in whether final ⟨a⟩ in open final syllables of root morphemes (for example buka 'to open') is pronounced as /a/ or as schwa /ə/. The former quality is employed by '/a/-varieties', found in Indonesian and those of Brunei, Sabah, Sarawak and northwestern Peninsular Malaysia (Kedah, Penang, Perlis), and the latter is employed by 'schwa-varieties' which is found in all the other parts of Peninsular Malaysia including the Malaysian capital, Kuala Lumpur and partly in Singapore. In schwa-varieties, ⟨a⟩ of the penultimate syllable is also modified if it is followed by ⟨a⟩, as in usaha [u.sə.hə] 'effort'. This final ⟨a⟩ difference is neutralized to /a/ when a suffix that starts with a vowel is added on, so the word bacaan 'act of reading' (< baca 'to read' + -an) is pronounced as [ba.t͡ʃa.ʔan] in both /a/ and schwa-varieties even though the word baca by itself would be pronounced as [ba.t͡ʃə] in schwa-varieties.
  - In schwa-varieties, as exceptions, final ⟨a⟩ in certain words are still pronounced as /a/. For example, bola 'ball' and juta 'million' are pronounced [bo.la] and [d͡ʒu.ta], not *[bo.lə] and *[d͡ʒu.tə]. Included in words of this type are recent borrowings, such as carta [t͡ʃa(r).ta] from English 'chart', and coinages that end with ⟨a⟩, such as tadika [ta.di.ka] 'kindergarten', which is a portmanteau of taman didikan kanak-kanak 'children's education park'.
  - In poem recitals and in singing, speakers of schwa-varieties often switch to an /a/-variety-type accent. That is, unless it is more regional in form. For example, Ghazal, which originated in Johor (in the context of Malaysia), is usually performed with schwa-variety pronunciation. Likewise, Boria, which originated in Penang, is typically performed with the /a/-variety pronunciation of the region. On the other hand, Syair, a traditional form of Malay poetry, is usually recited in the pronunciation variety of the speaker's background.
- One other difference between /a/ and schwa-varieties (although a minor one) is in the qualities of the /e/ and /o/. In /a/-varieties, /e/ and /o/ are opener, approaching the qualities of [ɛ] and [ɔ] so that words like belek 'to inspect' and botol 'bottle' would be pronounced as [bɛlɛʔ] and [bɔtɔl] in /a/-varieties while they are pronounced as [beleʔ] and [botol] in schwa-varieties.
- According to Adelaar (1992), standard Malay /i, u/ and /e, o/ do not contrast in closed-final syllables and can experience non-phonemic lowering of various degrees, as long as they are not higher than the vowel in the penultimate syllable if that vowel is /i, e, u, o/:
  - In Bruneian Standard Malay, in agreement with Adelaar (1992), they can have mid or even open realisations as long as they are not higher than the vowel in the preceding syllable. This means giling 'to roll' and burung 'bird' can be pronounced as [gilɪŋ ~ gileŋ ~ gilɛŋ] and [burʊŋ ~ buroŋ ~ burɒŋ], while geleng 'shake' and borong 'buy in bulk' can only be pronounced as [geleŋ ~ gelɛŋ] and [boroŋ ~ borɔŋ] and not as *[ɡelɪŋ] and *[borʊŋ].
  - In Indonesian, closed final syllable /i/ and /u/ often only get realised as [ɪ] and [ʊ] while closed final /e/ and /o/ often get realized as [ɛ] and [ɔ].
  - In schwa-varieties, according to Mukhlis & Wee (2021), closed final syllable ⟨i, u⟩ are pronounced the same as ⟨e, o⟩ as /e, o/ except in some loanwords such as aiskrim 'ice cream' /aiskrim/ and kasus 'case' /kasus/ and a few native words for some speakers such as putus 'to snap' /putus/, while according to Asmah (2015), closed final syllable ⟨i, u⟩ are pronounced as /e, o/ only before silent word-final ⟨r⟩ whereas before other consonants, they are lowered [i̞, u̞] but do not merge with /e, o/, with a merger in these environments according to her being indicative of Johor dialectal speech rather than standard schwa-variety speech.
  - In Baku pronunciation, no allophonic lowering of closed-final /i, u/ occurs.
- Assuming Adelaar's (1992) view above that /i, u/ and /e, o/ do not contrast in closed-final syllables, the vowels [e] and [o] must still be accorded phonemic status, as they would still contrast with [i] and [u] in penultimate positions with minimal pairs such as bilik 'room' and belek 'to inspect' and burung 'bird' and borong 'to wholesale'.
- When /i, u/ appear next to a vowel of a different colouring, an approximant [j] or [w] can be epenthesized in between those two vowels, so that words like cium 'kiss' and bau 'odour' would be pronounced as [t͡ʃijom ~ t͡ʃijʊm] and [bawu]. This epenthesization is sometimes represented in writing too with an inserted ⟨y⟩ or ⟨w⟩ so that the two aforementioned words would be spelt as ciyum and bawu instead.
- The vowels of [e], [ɛ], and [ə] are commonly written without diacritics as ⟨e⟩. The vowel [ɛ] is allophone of [e], while [ə] is not. The diacritics are only used to indicate the correct pronunciation, for example, in dictionaries. In Indonesian, the vowels are marked with diacritics as [e] ⟨é⟩, [ɛ] ⟨è⟩ and [ə] ⟨ê⟩ from 2015 to 2022 and as [e], [ɛ] ⟨e⟩ and [ə] ⟨ê⟩ since 2022. A different system represents [e], [ɛ], and [ə] as ⟨e⟩, ⟨é⟩, and ⟨ě⟩ respectively. In Malay, [e] and [ə] are represented by ⟨é⟩ and ⟨e⟩, otherwise respectively known as e taling and e pepet. Indonesian also uses the vowel [ɘ] (spelled eu) in some loanwords from Sundanese and Acehnese, e. g. eurih, seudati, sadeu.
- Word-final [e] and [o] are rare in Malay, except for loanwords, like teko 'teapot' (from Hokkien 茶鈷 tê-kó͘), toko 'small shop' (from Hokkien 土庫 thó͘-khò͘), semberono/sembrono 'careless' (from Javanese sembrana), gede (Javanese of big), konde (from Javanese kondhe, bulbous hairdo or hair extension on the back of the head), kare (Indonesian term for curry, variation of kari, from Tamil kaṟi), mestizo (from Spanish), kredo 'creed' (from Latin credo), risiko 'risk' (from Dutch risico), and non-Malay Indonesian names, like Manado and Suharto.
  - In schwa-varieties, word-final [e] and [o] frequently occur as realizations of word-final ⟨ir, er⟩ and ⟨ur, or⟩ where the ⟨r⟩ is silent so words such as alir 'to flow' and leher 'neck' and bubur 'porridge' and kotor 'dirty' are pronounced as [ale] and [lehe] and [bubo] and [koto] with word-final [e] and [o].
- [ɑ] is an occasional allophone of /a/ after emphatic consonants, and including /r/, /ɣ/, and /q/ from Arabic words. Example: qari [qɑri].
- Some words borrowed from European languages have several notes:
  - Some words borrowed from European languages have the vowels [ɛ] and [ɔ], such as pek 'pack' [pɛk] and kos 'cost' [kɔs]. Words borrowed earlier have a more nativized pronunciation, such as pesta 'fest', which is pronounced [pestə]. Some systems represent [ɔ] as ⟨ó⟩.
  - Some words borrowed from European languages reflect the language origin, generally Dutch (for Indonesian) and English (for Standard Malay), specifically as vowels of [e], [ɛ], and [ə] are commonly written without diacritics as ⟨e⟩. For example, the word presiden 'president' is pronounced as /prɛˈsidɛn/ in Indonesian and /prɛˈsidən/ in Standard Malay which reflect on /prezi'dɛnt/ in Dutch and /ˈpɹɛzɪdənt/ in English.

Malay Pronunciation Standards according to Mukhlis & Wee (2021)
	Example	Pronunciation		
	Example	Johor–Riau (Piawai)	Northern Peninsular	Baku & Indonesian
⟨a⟩ in final open syllable	⟨kereta⟩	/ə/	/a/	/a/
⟨i⟩ in final closed syllable with final ⟨n⟩ and ⟨ng⟩	⟨salin⟩	/e/	/i/	/i/
⟨i⟩ in final closed syllable with other final consonants	⟨itik⟩	/e/	/e/	/i/
⟨u⟩ in final closed syllable with final ⟨n⟩ and ⟨ng⟩	⟨agung⟩	/o/	/u/	/u/
⟨u⟩ in final closed syllable with other final consonants	⟨lumpur⟩	/o/	/o/	/u/

=== Diphthongs ===
Some analyses claim that Malay has three native diphthong phonemes only in open syllables; they are:

- /ai̯/: kedai 'shop', pandai 'clever'
- /au̯/: kerbau 'buffalo'
- /oi̯/: dodoi, amboi

Others assume that these "diphthongs" are actually a monophthong followed by an approximant, so ⟨ai⟩ represents /aj/, ⟨au⟩ represents /aw/, and ⟨oi⟩ represents /oj/. On this basis, there are no phonological diphthongs in Malay.

Words borrowed from Dutch or English with /eɪ/, such as Mei 'May' from Dutch and survei 'survey' from English, are pronounced with /e/ as this feature also happens to English /oʊ/ which becomes /o/. However, Indonesian introduced forth diphthong of /ei̯/ since 2015, such as in ⟨Méi⟩ 'May' /mei̯/.

Diphthongs are differentiated from two vowels in two syllables, such as:

- /a.i/: e.g. rai 'celebrate' [ra.i], kain 'cloth' [ka.en] ~ [ka.ɪn]
- /a.u/: bau 'smell' [ba.u], laut 'sea' [la.ot] ~ [la.ʊt]

Two vowels that could form a diphthong are actually pronounced separately:

- when the two vowels belong to a closed syllable, i.e. a syllable that ends with a consonant. E.g. a + i in kain 'cloth' are pronounced separately [ka.en] ~ [ka.ɪn], because the syllable ends with an "n" consonant — and thus is a closed syllable.
- when the word would be only one-syllable long if pronounced with a diphthong. E.g. a + u in bau 'smell' are pronounced separately [ba.u], because a diphthong would result into a single-syllable word.
- when the two syllables belong to two different morphemes. E.g. a + i in gulai 'to sweeten' are pronounced separately as [gu.la.ʔi], because the word is made out of two morphemes: gula 'sugar' + -i (transitive/causative verb-forming suffix), distinct from gulai (kind of curry) [ɡu.lai̯].

Even if it is not differentiated in modern Latin spelling, diphthongs and vowel sequences are differentiated in Jawi orthography, where a vowel hiatus is indicated by the symbol hamzah ⟨ء⟩, for example: لاءوت laut ('sea').

== Stress ==
There have been multiple contradictory accounts of stress in Malay, with some arguing for penultimate stress and others for final stress. Native speakers have difficulty in identifying a stressed syllable, and instrumental investigation finds that there is no stress in Malay, neither phonemic nor predictable. However, to an English speaker, standard Malay words spoken in isolation are typically perceived as having penultimate stress, unless the penultimate vowel is a schwa /ə/, in which case the perceived stress shifts to the final syllable in disyllabic words, and to the antepenultimate syllable in longer words. Some suffixes shift stress, some do not.

== Rhythm ==
The classification of languages based on rhythm can be problematic. Acoustic measurements suggest that Malay has more syllable-based rhythm than British English, even though doubts remain about whether the syllable is the appropriate unit for the study of Malay prosody.

== Syllable structure ==
Most of the native lexicon is based on disyllabic root morphemes, with a small percentage of monosyllabic and trisyllabic roots.

Syllables are consonant–vowel–consonant (C)V(C), where the V is a monophthong and the final C may be a semivowel (/w/ or /j/ – see the discussion of diphthongs above), some other sonorant, a voiceless plosive, the native fricative /s/, or a glottal: /m n ŋ, p t k, s, r l, j w, ʔ h/.

== Baku pronunciation in Malaysia and Singapore ==
In an effort to further standardize Malay across political boundaries after having done so in other aspects such as with spelling with the 1972 spelling reform, the artificial Baku standard of pronunciation which follows a 'pronounce as spelt' guide to pronunciation was introduced and started being implemented in Malaysia in the year 1988. Starting in 1993, schools were ordered to use it in lessons and examinations, and students were only allowed to answer oral tests with Baku pronunciation. This effort ceased in 2000 with a government circular ordering its replacement in schools in favour of 'common pronunciation' (sebutan biasa). The Malaysian Minister of Education later said that this move was done because Baku pronunciation was 'different from the pronunciation commonly used by the people of this country', although some believe it had more political motivations as one of the biggest proponents of Baku pronunciation at the time, Anwar Ibrahim, had just been sacked from his position as Deputy Prime Minister just two years earlier in 1998.

Singapore started using the Baku standard for official purposes in 1993. Ever since then, there have been various protests from Malay Singaporeans, calling for the return of the Johor-Riau standard as the official standard for standard Malay pronunciation. One prominent critic of the use of the Baku standard was the late Berita Harian editor Guntor Sadali, who noted that 'members of the Malay community generally find that Sebutan Baku (Baku Pronunciation) is very awkward'. Studies analysing the Standard Malay speech of Singaporean students, teachers and political leaders found that speakers generally speak with a 'hybrid accent' when speaking Standard Malay, mixing Johor-Riau and Baku pronunciation features. This pronunciation-mixing is particularly common in spontaneous speech where speakers are unable to monitor their speech as well as compared to when they are reading off a text.
