= Dewan Bahasa dan Pustaka =

Malaysian language regulator and publisher

Institute of Language and Literature
- Dewan Bahasa dan Pustaka or DBP ديوان بهاس دان ڤوستاک
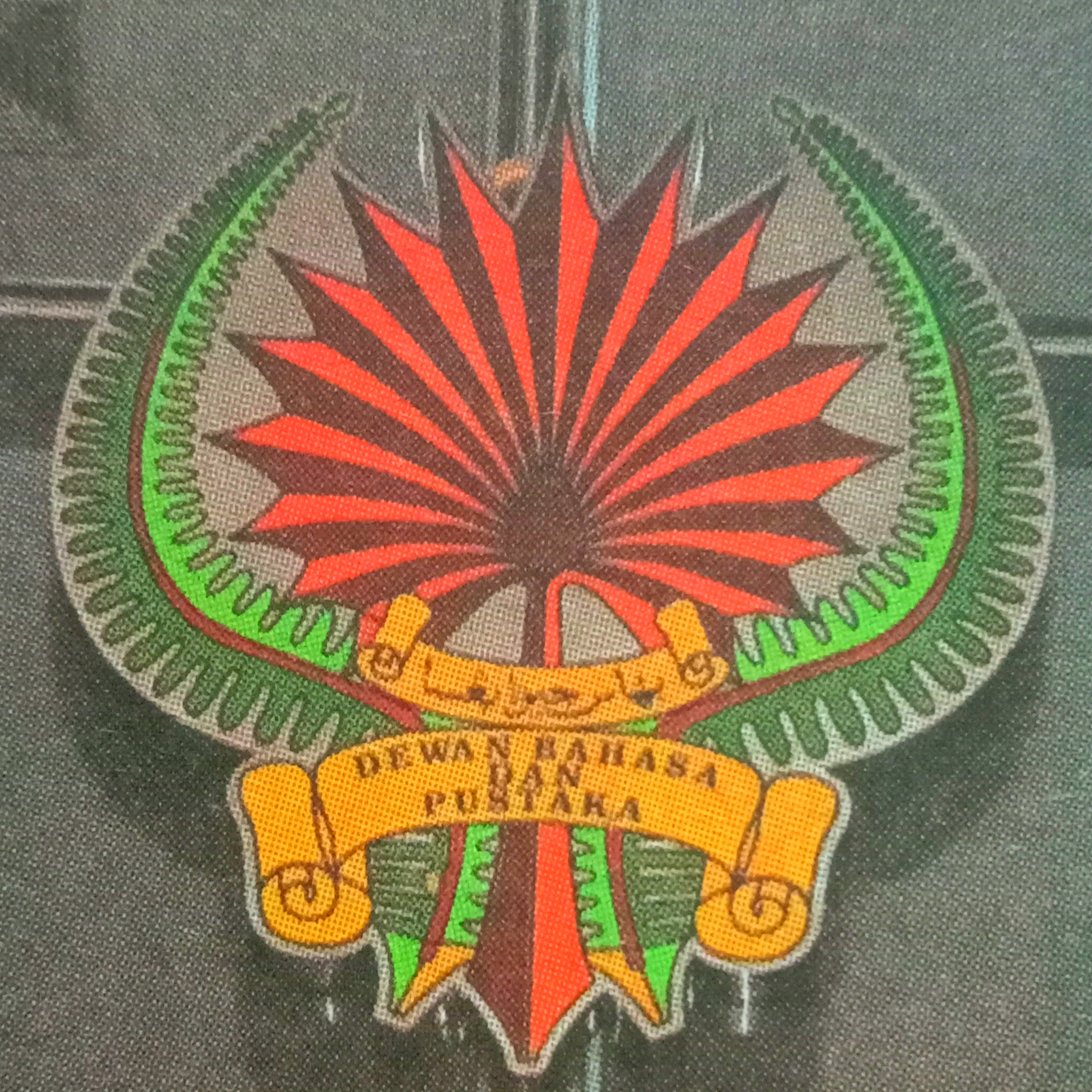
- The seal of the Dewan Bahasa dan Pustaka

Agency overview
- Formed: 22 June 1956
- Preceding agency: Balai Pustaka
- Type: Regulating and co-ordinating Malay language and literature in Malaysia
- Jurisdiction: Malaysia
- Headquarters: Dewan Bahasa and Pustaka Tower, Jalan Dewan Bahasa, Bukit Petaling, 50460 Kuala Lumpur
- Motto: بهاس جيوا بڠسا; Bahasa Jiwa Bangsa (The Language is the Soul of the Nation)
- Employees: 900+
- Annual budget: RM 60.52 million (2024)
- Minister responsible: Fadhlina Sidek, Minister of Education
- Deputy Minister responsible: Wong Kah Woh, Deputy Minister of Education
- Agency executives: Mohd Anwar Rethwan, Chairman; Hazami Jahari, Director-General
- Website: www.dbp.gov.my

Footnotes
- Dewan Bahasa dan Pustaka on Facebook

Dewan Bahasa dan Pustaka (English: Institute of Language and Literature, Jawi: ديوان بهاس دان ڤوستاک), abbreviated DBP, is the government body responsible for coordinating the use of the Malay language and Malay-language literature in Malaysia.

== History ==
DBP Malaysia was established as Balai Pustaka in Johor Bahru on 22 June 1956, It was placed under the purview of the then Malayan Ministry of Education.

During the Kongres Bahasa dan Persuratan Melayu III (The Third Malay Literary and Language Congress) which was held between 16 and 21 September 1956 in both Singapore and Johor Bahru, Balai Pustaka was renamed Dewan Bahasa dan Pustaka. Royal Prof Ungku Abdul Aziz Ungku Abdul Hamid was instrumental in setting up the institution.

In 1957, DBP moved from Johor Bahru to Kuala Lumpur. Through Ordinan Dewan Bahasa dan Pustaka 1959, DBP was granted a charter with its own Board of Governors. With the charter, DBP has the power to form policies regarding the Malay language, responsible to spread the language and is able to go into book publishing business.

On 31 January 1962, DBP moved to its own building at Jalan Lapangan Terbang Lama (now Jalan Dewan Bahasa). The building's architect was Lee Yoon Thim and the prominent mural was by Ismail Mustam. Three other offices were established in Bukit Mertajam (1999), Kota Bharu (1999) and Johor Bahru (2003). The institution celebrated its 50th anniversary in 2006.

=== Takeover of Borneo Literature Bureau ===
Not long after the World War II 1940s to late 1960s, Crown officials of Sarawak founded the Borneo Literature Bureau (BLB) responsible for collecting and writing down the oral literature of many indigenous Bornean languages, Iban especially. Such efforts bolstered a sense of pride as it also lead to explorations of native philosophy and epistemology.

DBP opened offices in Kota Kinabalu and Kuching in 1977, taking over the role of BLB. Soon after that, there were witness accounts of DBP burying all BLB published books; however, some books were found and rescued. It was later alleged that all the books were burnt. Initially, DBP officials insisted on publishing works in national language (Malay language) or other vernaculars. However, soon after that DBP stated that they cannot publish books in regional languages because this would be against its own policy and is not economically sound in a small market of readers. Regarding the allegation that books of BLB were burnt, former Sarawak state DBP deputy director said that old books were written off or given away when it was expired, no longer needed, or there were overstocks. In 2024, DBP denied that the books were burnt by the agency. It maintained that all the 1,077 BLB books were still preserved in storage. Meanwhile, the Sarawak DBP Director maintained that more than 1,000 BLB books are preserved in Sarawak branch of DBP and is available to the public.

== Dictionary and other publications ==
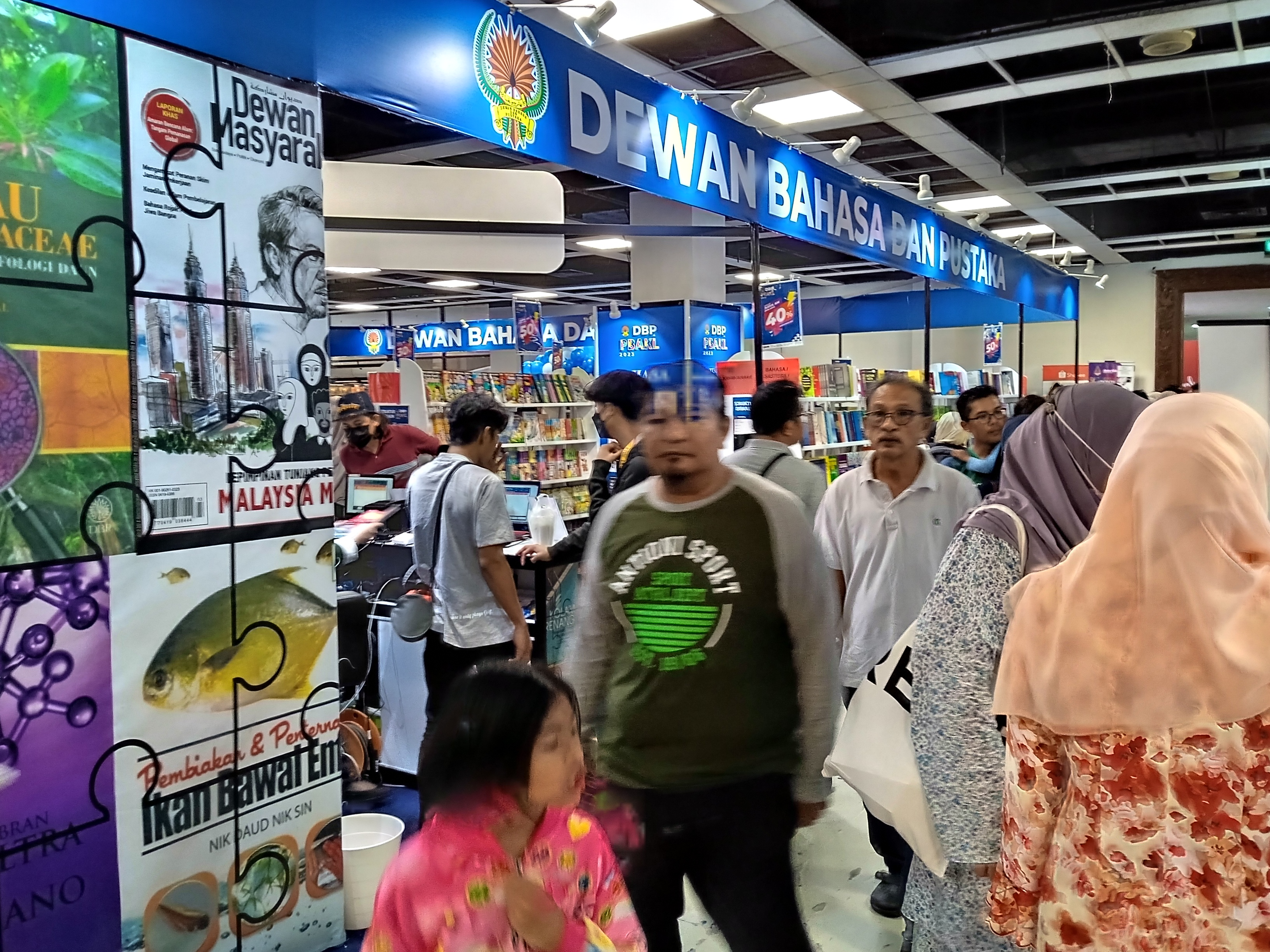
Dewan Bahasa dan Pustaka kiosk at PBAKL 2023.

DBP publishes the Kamus Dewan, for many years the prestigious dictionary of the Malaysian national language. The dictionary is not only descriptive, but rather it is also prescriptive, as it represents the results of the efforts of DBP to adapt the Malay language to accommodate the challenges of technology and science. DBP's role in developing and regulating the language may be likened to that of similar government bodies in other countries, for example the Académie Française.

It also processes many books, mainly work books and novels.
