= Ratu Teluwaih Jinih =

Teluwaih Jinih
- Formation: 2008; 18 years ago
- Type: Beauty pageant
- Headquarters: Mukah, Sarawak
- Location: Malaysia
- Official language: Bahasa Malaysia; Melanau; Sarawak Malay
- Parent organization: Melanau Mukah Association

Teluwaih Jinih (Malay: Wanita Cantik; English: Beautiful Lady) is a local beauty pageant based in Mukah, Sarawak. Began in 2008, it is the centerpiece of the Mukah Kaul Festival, which usually lasts a week.

The current Teluwaih Jinih is Sharvel Sebastian from Mukah. She was crowned by outgoing titleholder, Joshelynnia Jackery on 1 May 2026 at Kala Dana Beach, Mukah. This marks the second time in the pageant history that a district has won twice consecutively.

== Background ==
Teluwaih Jinih literally means "beautiful lady" in the Melanau language and is one of the main event during Kaul Mukah festival. The pageant is open for participants of Melanau descent ages 18 to 30 and is held to find the icon for Melanau women aside from promoting and enliven the festival itself. The competition has the concept of showcasing the traditional Melanau attire and contemporary attire that is prepared by the participants themselves and was conceived specially to promote the Melanau traditional attire to those people who never knew about the Melanau culture. From 2023 edition onward, the evening gown segment was added to showcase the gown made by Sarawakian designers.

Besides than promoting the culture, the competition itself also provide Melanau's women a chance and opportunities to showcase their abilities, talents and knowledge as well as to discover modelling talents among its participants. The competition is applicable to those of the Melanau race (pure or mixed), from or outside Mukah and organized by the Sri Ritma Borneo Mukah Culture Club and Melanau Mukah Association.

== Titleholders ==
Edition	Ratu Teluwaih Jinih	Age (Note: Ages at the time of the pageant)	Represented	Date
2026	Sharvel Iris Sebastian Umat	22	Mukah	1 Mei 2026
2025	Joshelynnia Josefinna Jackery	19	Mukah	24 April 2025
2024	Catherine Budin	26	Dalat	18 July 2024
2023	Eunice Vanessa Francis	20	Miri	29 April 2023
~~2022~~	Pageant cancelled due to COVID-19 pandemic			
~~2021~~	No pageant was held due to the COVID-19 pandemic			
~~2020~~	Pageant cancelled due to the COVID-19 pandemic			
~~2019~~	No pageant			
2018	Alicia Faustina Juran	22	Kuching	26 April 2018
2017	Racheal Chia	17	Miri	26 April 2017
~~2016~~	No pageant			
2015	Hilda Melissa Setia	24	Dalat	24 April 2015
2014	Quyyns Evysia Waysia	20	Kuching	26 April 2014
2013	Wawa Kassim		Dalat	28 April 2013
2012	Ayu Kasputri		Kuching	27 April 2012
2011	Madellina Bujang	23	Miri	27 April 2011
2010	Juliet Ono		Sibu	26 April 2010
2009	Geroldyien Ginda	18	Mukah	26 April 2009
2008	Connilia Tu	17	Mukah	26 April 2008

== List of Runner-ups ==
Edition	1st Runner-Up	2nd Runner-Up	3rd Runner-Up	4th Runner-Up
2026	Rohadatul Arissa Abdullah; Mukah	Nurul Dhabitah Sebli; Dalat		
2025	Yvonne Natasya Bell; Mukah	Elmeldha Dellalynno Stalin; Mukah	Alexzandra Garnett; Mukah	Nur Azatul Hanim Jeffereen; Mukah
2024	Emassuria Scholyend Samsuhidi; Mukah	Intan Hayanie Muzzammil; Dalat	Norfazura Abdullah Mohamad Salim; Bintulu	Ann Eleanor Michael Umat; Mukah
2023	Iman Annemarie Sulaiman; Kuching	Criselda Yap; Dalat	Patricia Vivina Cosmas; Miri	Charmaine Chan William; Kuching
~~2022~~	Pageant cancelled due to the COVID-19 pandemic			
~~2021~~	No pageant was held due to the COVID-19 pandemic			
~~2020~~	Pageant cancelled due to the COVID-19 pandemic			
~~2019~~	No pageant			
2018	Catherine Budin	Zetty Morshidi	Nor Fitrah Izatul	Joecyline Neomy
2017	Natalie Abdullah	Felicia Juran	Not awarded	
~~2016~~	No pageant			
2015	Aida Suyong	Siti Hajar Morni	Not awarded	
2014	Karmila Yahdi	Aida Suyong	Not awarded	
2013	No data			
2012	No data			
2011	Nuraini Hasnul	Noraini Amin	Not awarded	
2010	No data			
2009	No data			
2008	No data			

== List of Districts by Number of Wins ==
District	Total of Win(s)	Year(s)
Mukah	4	2008, 2009, 2025, 2026
Dalat	3	2013, 2015, 2024
Kuching	3	2012, 2014, 2018
Miri	3	2011, 2017, 2023
Sibu	1	2010
