= Melanau calendar =

Calendar

The Melanau calendar (Malay: Bulan Melanau) is a calendar used by the Melanau people of Borneo. Its year consists of 12 months. The first month, Pengejin, signifies the celebration of the Kaul festival (a giving of thanks for the preceding year, with prayers for the year ahead). Each month in the Melanau calendar consists of 30 days. It is guided by the constellations, natural phenomena and guardian spirits. Each month is named for occurrences during the month or events which are supposed to have occurred during that particular month, according to legend. The rise and fall of the Sun, the Moon and the stars determine the time for planting, harvesting, fishing, building, travel and marriage.

== Melanau universe ==
The Melanau concept of the universe is a multilayered one, in which the territories of all should be respected and a balance maintained. Hence, it is important to be aware of one's surroundings: changes in the weather, the wind, the tides and the position of the constellations. The Melanau calendar is a guide for daily activities such as fishing, planting, harvesting, homebuilding and marriage, because the calendar is guided by the constellations and the ways of nature, spirits and God.

== Months ==
Gregorian month	Melanau month
March	Pengejin (Month of the spirits)
April	Pengelawah Umik (Month of cloudy water)
May	Pengelawah Ayeng (Month of clear water)
June	Paka Umik (Month of the lesser stars)
July	Paka Ayeng (Month of the greater stars)
August	Pelepa (Month of plenty)
September	Pegalan (Month of the North Star)
October	Suwah (Month of the waves)
November	Pidai (Month of the discoloured sky)
December	Penangaih (Month of revival)
January	Pemalei (Taboo month)
February	Pengesiseng (Month of the gills)

Pengejin

This month coincides with the Gregorian month of March. During this month it is windy; light rain showers fall during the early part of the month. The wind gradually strengthens, the sun moves north and the moon replaces the original position of the sun. Fish are plentiful in forest ponds, as they search for food; afterwards, they again go into hiding. Bulan Pengejin marks the beginning of the year. Since it is difficult for the Melanau to work outdoors because of the strong wind, they spend their time indoors cleaning the tools of their trades. At the end of the month, the Melanau purify themselves and call the fish from the beaches and river mouths in a ceremony known as Kaul. The Melanau build a large swing (known as a Tibow); during its construction they sing the tibow song, seeking the blessings of their guardian gods for plentiful flowers, bountiful harvests of fruits and fish and the removal of illness and evil. They send offerings (known as Seraheng) out to sea to appease the gods and invite them to the feast. After the feast, leftover food and drink is left by the shore for the guardians spirits to take with them; nothing is kept.

Pengelawah Umik

This second month coincides with the month of April. During Pengelawah Umik, it is said that all the fish will come down to the sea; the sea turns a greenish color, a call to the fish that it is time to surface. For the Melanau, this month begins the fishing season. Melanau fishermen were formerly known for their barong panau, a fishing sailboat which could go out to sea for weeks on end and doubled as a travel and trade boat. The barong panau is no longer used, since the skills to build them have been lost. A picture of the boat may be found a Brooke-era postage stamp.

Pengelawah Ayeng

The third month coincides with the month of May, when the emerald-greenish sea color first observed in Pengelawah Umik reaches the shore and the fishing season reaches its peak. Towards the end of this month, the sea loses its opaque green color and the sea floor will be visible from the surface; fishing becomes more challenging at the end of the first fishing season, which concludes at the beginning of Paka Umik, when winds and rain make fishing impossible.

Paka Umik

The fourth month coincides with the month of June, when the Seven Sisters appear in the skies. According to legend the west wind blows hard, to arrange the stars in the sky. During this month the Melanau go into the forest and begin the planting season, cutting large trees and vines and planting their crops. The farmers will continue their jungle-clearing work until the beginning of the next month, Paka Ayeng.

Paka Ayeng

The fifth month coincides with July. The Seven Sisters are high in the sky, and the Three Stars appear lower in the sky. The wind blows with gale force; all farming and fishing activities cease for the month (due to the strong winds) until the next month, Pelepa.

Pelepa

The sixth month coincides with August. The Three Stars replace the Seven Sisters, rising high in the sky. The wind drops; the sea is calm and the second fishing season begins before the long monsoon (suloh), when no work can be done due to wind and heavy rain. This fishing season lasts until the beginning of the next month, Pegalan.

Pegalan

The seventh month coincides with September. The sea remains calm, but little fishing is done since the fish are spawning. Pegalan is named for the Pegalan (North) Star, which is high in the sky in the evening. Legend has it that this is the month when the Melanau find it difficult to "swallow their saliva" (look for food). Marriage is taboo during this month, since it is believed it would lead to difficulty making a living.

Suwah

The eighth month coincides with October. During Suwah, the ground seems to rise like waves; according to Melanau belief this is caused by fish swimming back to the ocean, their fins resembling waves. Suwah marks the third (and final) fishing season for the year; it is also the time to start planting rice, sago palm and other crops. In Melanau tradition, as the earth grows so will the crops that are planted.

Pidai

The ninth month, coinciding with November, is the beginning of the monsoon season (suloh). Strong winds begin to blow, shifting the location (it is believed) of the sun and moon (called bulan tenggara, the southeast moon). It is the end of the fishing season; in the morning the sea is calm, but by afternoon the waves will be high.

Penangaih

The tenth month coincides with December. It is the time when rains come, allowing flowers to blossom and fruits to bear in the forest.

Pemalei

The eleventh month coincides with January. Legend has it that long ago a shaman was beheaded by his wife. His head disappeared from the house (becoming the Taboo Star) and the month is named for the killing of the shaman. During this month all activity (marriage, fishing, planting and homebuilding) is taboo, and Pemalei is regarded as a month of misfortune.

Pengesiseng

Pengesiseng coincides with the month of February. Strong winds bring heavy rain, blowing flowers off trees and uprooting them; floodwaters then bring them to the sea, where they are pushed ashore by huge waves. The wind blows branches and fronds of the coconut, sago palms and other trees, opening them to resemble the gills of a fish (hence its name). Pengesiseng marks the end of the Melanau year.
