= Jerunei =

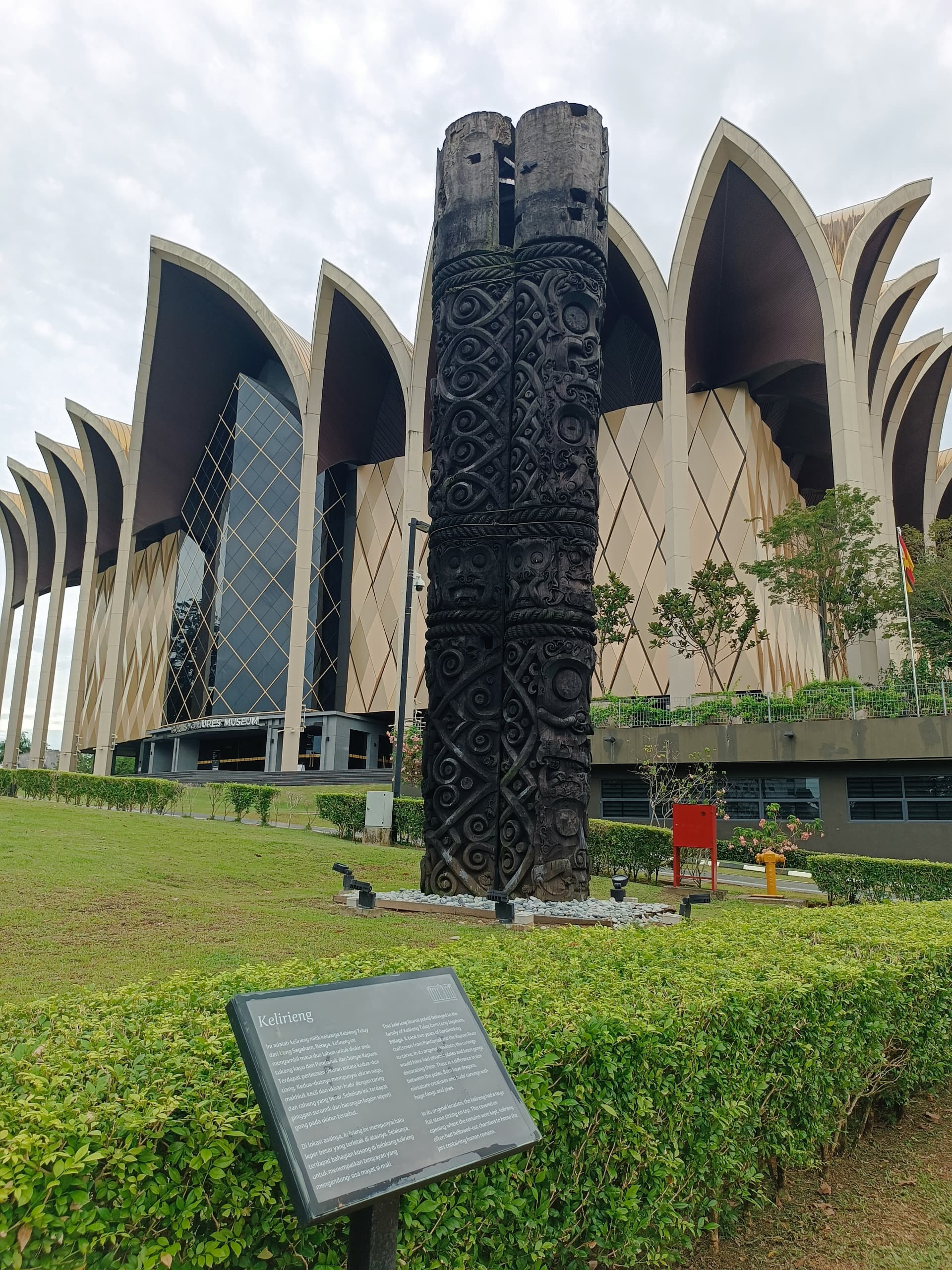
Kilirieng on display at the Borneo Cultures Museum, Kuching

Jerunei or kilirieng is a totem pole historically set up by the indigenous people across Sarawak, Malaysia, as part of burial ceremonies, especially among the Melanau and Kajang ethnicities.

== Structure ==
The jerunei is made of ironwood, being chosen for its durability and availability within the downstream Melanau settlements. Jerunei can be either carved with spirit (antu) illustrations or not, with the latter called kilirieng. Jerunei consists of an upper, middle and bottom parts. The upper part has a compartment for an urn containing the bones of the deceased, and sometimes attached with a female slave. The middle and bottom layers would also be fitted with remains. The jerunei is thought to be similar in style with corresponding wooden totem poles among the Kayan and Kenyah ethnicities in Kalimantan, Indonesia.

Constructing a jerunei takes months or years. During the construction duration, the kins of the deceased take effort to cover up the construction costs.

== Ceremony ==
In a jerunei ceremony, a hole will be dug out to place a male slave as sacrifice, for which he will be crushed as the jerunei is being dropped onto him, and it is believed that he will be the deceased's guardian in the afterlife. In some occasions, a female slave was tied up at the upper part and then left into starvation, and was also believed to later become a guardian in the afterlife.

== History ==
Initially, the jerunei was built as a burial totem for the local upper class as a display of status, given its large cost. However, as the local middle class expands and feudal power decays, the jerunei ceremony became more widespread and open to anyone with the financial means to do so.

The jerunei ceremony was done in accordance to the local likow worldview. However, the occasion became less widespread as Islam and Christianity were introduced and spread across Borneo in general. In 1842, the colonial White Rajah, James Brooke, banned the practice that he deemed as inhumane, although it was still practiced until the last recorded ceremony in 1880.
