= Kaul festival =

Melanau annual cleansing festival

- Official name: Pesta Kaul
- Observed by: Melanau people in Sarawak, Malaysia
- Significance: Historically celebrated as a religious ceremony to appease the spirits of the sea, land, forest and farm making it the most important festival in the Melanau traditional calendar.
- Date: Third week in April
- Frequency: Annual

Kaul (or Pesta Kaul) is a Melanau annual "cleansing" when traditionally, uninvited spirits and other bad influences were escorted out of the village by a flotilla of boats, and ceremonial offerings of food, cigarettes and betel nut were set on the Seraheng (decorated pole) at the river mouth.

The word "kaul" means "coming together" in Melanau language.

== The Beginning of Kaul ==
Originating from the animistic beliefs traditionally held by the Melanau people, Kaul is held annually in Bulan Pengejin (The month of the Spirits) of the Melanau Calendar, which is usually in the end of April, as a purification and thanks giving to appease the spirits of the sea called Ipok. It coincides with the end of the Northeast monsoon, once a time of hardship when the sea was too rough to fish and the villages often suffered from flooding. Traditionally, Villages would be palei or taboo for days before Kaul. No one was allowed to leave or enter, and people underwent purification ceremonies during Kaul. The celebration of Kaul concluded with a communal picnic at the river mouth, followed by a return to the village and again three days of prescribed restrictions.

== The Serahéng ==
The festival would start with offerings of traditional food in a special offering basket or "serahéng" which would be placed on the beach at a chosen site near the river mouth. If there were leftovers it would also be left near the seraheng site.

== The Celebration of Kaul ==
The Father of the Kaul (Bapa Kaul) would sing them mantras to that effect to start the Kaul(KAWUL). Then they would celebrate them in a grand feast where all the people would bring with them food and drink to eat at a huge picnic by the river mouth and the beaches. They would build huge swings or 'tibou' for them to play with the spirits. They would also send offerings in the form of 'seraheng', an arrangement created with the leaves of the sago palm, the staple food of the Melanau. They would play all sorts of games on the beach for the whole day. They would leave whatever food that is left on the beaches and the river mouth for the spirits to feast upon at the end of the day when the festival is done for the day. It is taboo to bring the food back as it is for them who have guarded them and provided for them all their lives. otherwise, they would be cursed.

== The Spiritual Meaning of Kaul ==
Kaul - celebrated in the Melanau month of Pengejin to thank the Ipok (spirits/guardians) for a bountiful year past and a prayer for a good year ahead. The Melanaus belief is animistic and they believe that the world is protected and guarded by the various spirits, such as Ipok Guun (the guardian of the jungle), Ipok Talun (forest), Ipok Sungai (rivers), Ipok Pangai (wind) and Ipok Daat (sea). During this time, they would honour them for what they were given for the year and ask them for their good will for the coming year. They would sing their praises and thank them for the harvest given to them in the past and pray that they would grant them protection and give them a bountiful harvest in the year to come. In up-river Melanau towns such as Dalat and Medong, there are also all kinds of water sports including traditional canoe races with as many paddler as can fit into the boat and, in more modern times in the richer towns, power boat races. All the while they are accompanied by a larger boat containing a traditional gong orchestra.

== Kaul as the Melanau New Year ==
Bulan Pengejin (The month of the Spirits) is the first month of the Melanau Calendar (Bulan Melanau), which coincides with the end of the northeast monsoon season between March and April of the Gregorian calendar. For many societies the month January signifies a renewal of life. Hence the Spirit of celebration for the regeneration while discarding the old and worn out. On the contrary, the month January coincides with the eleventh month of melanau calendar called Bulan Pemalei (The month of Taboo.) This Month is to remind the tragic killing of a great shaman (a bebayuh) in ancient times. Hence all activities such as Marriage, fishing, planting or any activities of livelihood are not allowed during this month. It is regarded as a month of ill fortune. Therefore, New Year’s Day on 1 January is actually celebrated on the Melanau month of ill fortune. The Melanau however celebrate their New Year on Bulan Pengejin (The month of the Spirits) which coincides with the month of March. Kaul Festival is also celebrated to welcome the New Year.

== The Tibau ==
The Tibau is a death-defying 20-foot high swing, in which youths dive from a high bamboo scaffolding and catch a swinging rope as it reaches the height of its arc. First one, then two and eventually eight young men hang in a clump from the giant swing as it soars above the beach. Pesta Kaul is a colorful festival with a flotilla of highly decorated boats, beach games and Melanau food. Traditionally, during the monsoon, the river mouths were closed.

== See also ==
- Teluwaih Jinih, a beauty pageant competition held during the Kaul Festival.
