= Melanau language =

Austronesian language spoken in Malaysia and Brunei

Melanau
- Central Melanau
- Native to: Malaysia, Brunei
- Region: Sarawak and neighbouring Brunei
- Ethnicity: Melanau people
- Native speakers: (110,000 cited 2000)
- Language family: Austronesian: Malayo-Polynesian; North Bornean; Melanau–Kajang; Melanau

Language codes
- ISO 639-3: Variously: mel – Central Melanau dro – Daro-Matu Melanau sdx – Sibu Melanau
- Glottolog: cent2101 Central daro1239 Daro-Matu sibu1258 Sibu

Melanau is an Austronesian language spoken in the coastal area of the Rajang delta on northwest Borneo, Sarawak, Malaysia and Brunei. There are several dialects—Mukah-Oya, Balingian, Bruit, Dalat, Lawas, Igan, Sarikei, Segahan, Prehan, Segalang, and Siteng.

== Phonology ==
=== Consonants ===
Melanau has the following consonants.

		Bilabial	Coronal	Palatal	Velar	Uvular	Glottal
Nasals		m	n	ɲ	ŋ		
Plosives and affricates	voiceless	p	t	tʃ	k		ʔ
Plosives and affricates	voiced	b	d	dʒ	ɡ		ʔ
Fricatives			s				h, ɦ
Lateral			l				
Trills			r			ʀ	
Semivowels		w		j			

=== Vowels ===
Melanau has the following vowels.

	front	central	back rounded
High	i		u
Mid	ɛ	ə	ɔ
Low		a	

Sounds /i a u ɔ/ can have allophones of [ɪ æ~ʌ ʊ ɒ].

== Orthography ==
=== Vowels and diphthongs ===
- a – [a]
- aa – [aː]
- e – [ɛ/ə]
- i – [i]
- o – [ɔ]
- u – [u]
- ai – [ai]
- au – [au]
- ei – [ei]
- ou – [ou]
- ui – [ui]

=== Consonants ===
- b – [b]
- c – [t͡ʃ]
- d – [d]
- g – [g]
- h – [h, ɦ]
- j – [d͡ʒ]
- k – [k]
- l – [l]
- m – [m]
- n – [n]
- ng – [ŋ]
- ny – [ɲ]
- p – [p]
- r – [r/ʀ]
- s – [s]
- t – [t]
- w – [w]
- y – [j]
