= Melanau people =

Ethnic group from Sarawak, Malaysia

Melanau people; Tenawan Melanau / A-likou
A-Likou
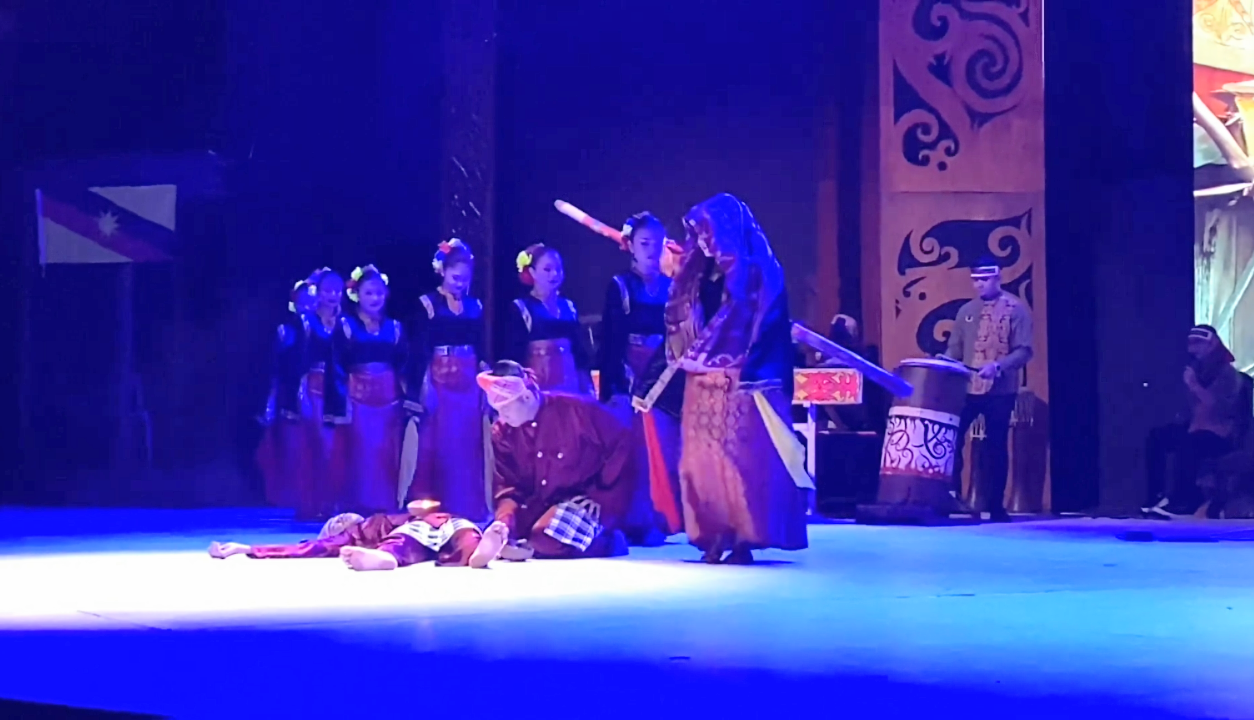

Total population
- 135,681 (2020 census)

Regions with significant populations
- Malaysia (Sarawak)

Languages
- Melanau; Sarawak Malay; Standard Malay; English

Religion
- Islam 73.14%, Christianity 18.99%, Animism 6.24%, Others 1.63%

Related ethnic groups
- Dayaks; Sarawakian Malays; Bruneian Malays

The Melanau (Malay: Orang Melanau, Melanau: Tenawan Melanau) or A-Likou (meaning River people in Mukah dialect) are an ethnic group indigenous to Sarawak, Malaysia, and also present in West Kalimantan, Indonesia. They are among the earliest settlers of Sarawak. They speak the Melanau language, which is a part of the North Bornean branch of the Malayo-Polynesian languages.

== Origins ==
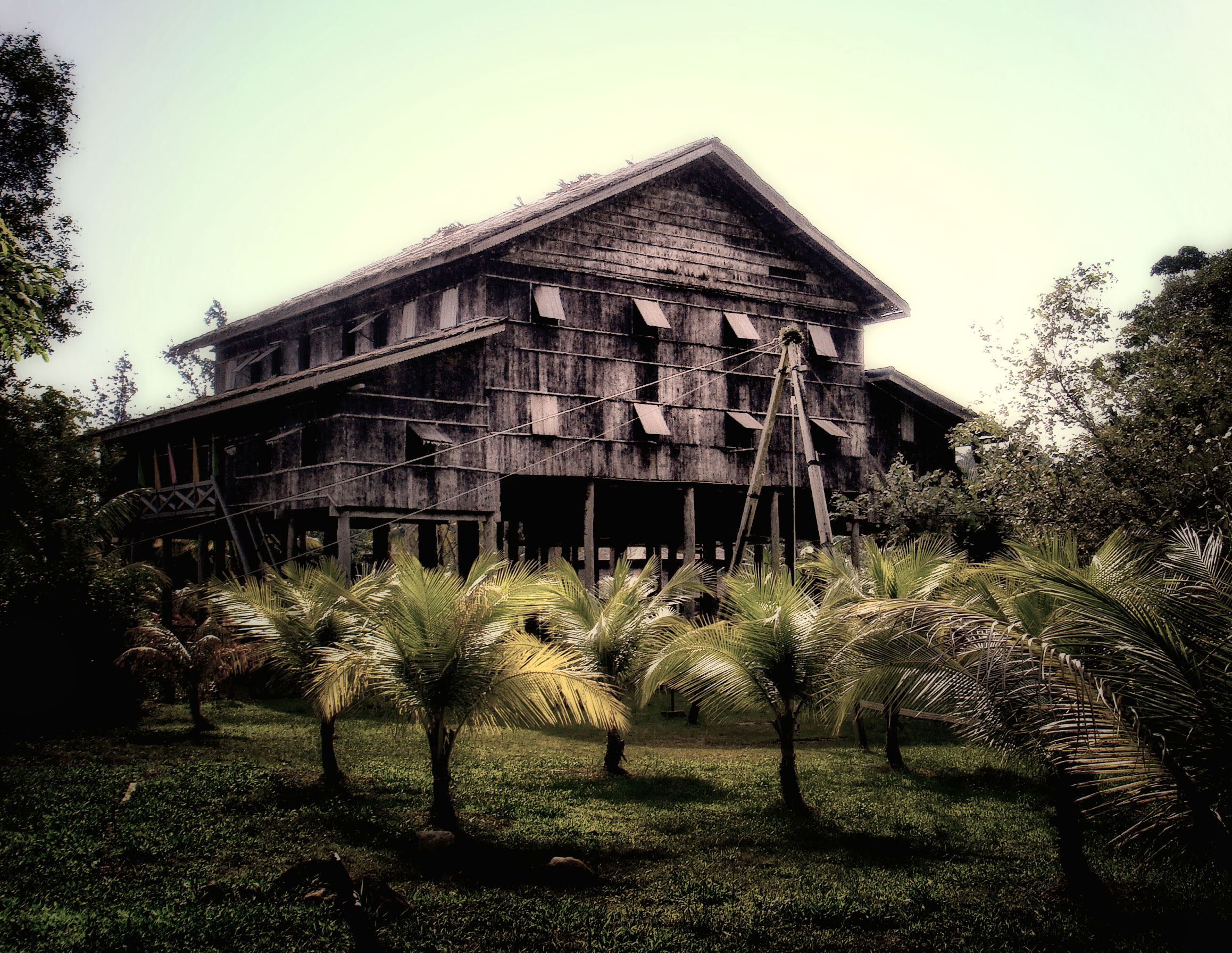
The traditional Melanau tall house. There are only few left standing in Sarawak.

In the 19th century, the Melanaus settled in scattered communities along the main tributaries of the Rajang River in Central Sarawak. They prefer to be known as Melanau or A-Likou. For most Melanau, the word 'Dayak' is inappropriate for them as it was a word used by the Westerners for the inhabitant of Borneo, while the Melanau people already had their own identity and culture as A-Likou (Melanau). Melanau or problematic Kajang-speaking tribes such as the Sekapan, the Rajang, the Tanjung, and the Kanowit gradually moved and assimilated into Dayak migrations settling in the Rajang. The Melanau people were regarded as a sub-group of the purported Klemantan people.

Today the Punan (or Punan Bah) people are also closely linked to the last riverine dwelling Melanau communities previously inhabiting the middle and upper Rejang tributaries. The Kajang language is kept relatively alive by the isolated Sekapan communities Kapit division of Sarawak.

The Melanau are considered among the earliest settlers in Sarawak. The name Melanau was not used by the Melanau to refer to themselves until recently. They call themselves a-likou meaning 'people of the river'. Legend has it that the name Melanau was given by the Malays of Brunei to the inhabitants of the coastal swamp flats and riverbanks of central Sarawak which might signify "coast-dweller". This legend cannot be considered a viable origin of the name since the name Malano has been used to refer to the region in historical records of writings and maps of Western, Chinese, and Javanese sources even before the establishment of Brunei Kingdom and the arrival of Malays to Borneo from Sumatra.

Eda Green, writing in 1909, referred to "... the Milanes, whose girls are as fair as any Europeans and the belles of Borneo."

== History ==
Throughout history, places where the Melanaus traditional areas were described as either their local places such as Mukah, Igan, etc., or by the wider state or region name Malano.

=== Prehistory ===
Before the Melanaus are known today as the ethnic name, the origins are vague as written records were not a common norm among the natives of Borneo. However, the linguistic evidence survived till today and ancient culture is preserved up till 19th century. The shared ancient culture of hanging coffin & burial poles (Kelidieng or Jerunei or Lejeng) between Melanaus and some orang ulu tribes such as Punan Bah, Kejaman, Sekapan etc. is a proof of the historical origin of the Melanau people. Not only that, the linguistic fondness to these tribes also is another clue of the bigger ethnic lost family link. The culture of Jerunei is found in areas of Melanaus such as Mukah, Dalat etc. and in Punan areas of Tatau, Belaga etc. and as far as East Kalimantan and South Kalimantan. Evidence of ancient Melanau burial site are known to the archeological society in Niah, Sekaloh This group of ancient people (split and broken today to smaller groups of Melanau, Kejaman, Sekapan, Punan Bah etc.) are one of the earliest and original people to settle in the island of Borneo. However, due intense direct influence from the Bruneian Malay Kingdom since 13th century, the culture and lifestyle of the coastal dwelling Melanaus today are highly similar to Malays on the exterior.

=== 7th century ===
The earliest existence of a polity at the mouth of the Rejang river is Kin-li-fo-che (shortened as Kin-fo) in Chinese records of I Ching which was already known in the 7th century. This Malanau empire covers North Borneo (Sabah), Sarawak, and Brunei. JL Moens mentioned Fo-che-pou-lo to be in the same location. On Mercator map of 1587 also locates the chief ports on the west coast of Borneo (Brunei) Malano and Puchavarao (Fo-che-pou-lo).

=== 12th–13th century ===
Zhao Rukuo or Chau Ju Kua wrote Zhu Fan Zhi, a collection of descriptions of countries and various products from outside China, and it is considered an important source of information on the people, customs and in particular the traded commodities of many countries in South East Asia and around the Indian Ocean during the Song dynasty which he finished around 1225. One of the nations is Sha Hua Kung which is similar to Sawaku, a name used to describe Sarawak by Majapahit in Kakawin Negarakertagama.

"..again in a south-easterly direction (from this country?) there are certain islands inhabited by savage robbers called Ma-lo-nu.. "

Furthermore, the translator/author Friedrich Hirth & W.W. Rockhill also suggest this is referring to either Borneo or Sumatra. There is a need for further study regarding this description. Zhao had not travelled outside of China, thus many entries of Zhu Fan Zhi took information from an older work from 1178, Lingwai Daida by another geographer, Zhou Qufei.

Among the earliest historical records of Melanau is from the Chinese records, Dade Nanhai Zhi between the 12th to 13th centuries. It mentions the places under the Fu Ni kingdom that covers Melanau areas of Igan, Tutong & Bintulu;

“Xiao Dong Yang's territory under the power of Fu Ni state includes Ma Li Lu (Manila), Ma Ye (Luzon), Mei Kun, Pu Duan (Panay), Su Lu (Sulu), Sha Hu Zhong (Marudu), Ya Chen (Igan), Odjuton (Tutong) and Wen Du Ling (Bintulu)."

The Maragtas Code, a document purported to be based on written and oral sources of which no copy has survived in the Philippines, tells the History of Panay from the first inhabitants and the Bornean immigrants. It tells about the migration of ten datus from Borneo to Panay due to the strangling and oppressive rule of Datu Makatunao. Haven, they found in Madiaas which were inhabited by the Negritos in whom Datu Puti bought the island in what is the Panay island in the Philippines today It is believed that Makatunao described is Raja Tugau, a well-known king figure in Melanau oral literature and also in Bruneian literature of Syair Awang Semaun. The quality of the evil king persisted and the document is dated in 1225 according to Prof. Henry Otley Beyer but such dates are contested by other scholars in the field of history Until today, people of Panay celebrate Ati-Atihan, a festival tracing back its historical footprint to these 10 datus.

=== 14th century ===
Malano was also, one of the vassal states under Majapahit kingdom as described by Mpu Prapanca in Kakawin Negarakertagama (pupuh 14) in 1365;

"Kadandangan, Landa Samadang dan Tirem tak terlupakan, Sedu, Barune (ng), Kalka, Saludung, Solot dan juga Pasir, Barito, Sawaku, Tabalung, ikut juga Tanjung Kutei, Malano tetap yang terpenting di pulau Tanjungpura."

Following Hayam Wuruk's death in 1389, Majapahit power entered a period of decline with conflict over succession. This window of opportunity gives local kingdoms to flourish.

Syair Awang Semaun which tells the establishment of the Brunei Kingdom is an epic poem passed down from generations. There are many versions of the manuscripts of at least 6 believed to be written into a manuscript in the 19th century. The poem mentions the conquest of 14 brothers establishing a kingdom. Their territorial expansion begins with conquering the Melanau areas which were under the power of Tugau and his allies covering from Sambas to Hulu Sungai Brunei.

=== 17th century ===
A Dutch report by Blommart in 1609 mentioned that the Kalka, Saribas and Melanau chiefs had revolted and defected to Sambas which was previously under the Brunei empire:

“Teyen on the river Lauwe, Sadong in Borneo Proper (the eastern boundary of Sarawak,) Mampawa and Borneo were the best places for trade. At Sambas, tidings were received that the people Calca, Seribas, and Melanuge had fallen away from Borneo (Brunei), and placed themselves under the power of the king of Johore (Sambas). These were places of large trade, where much gold, benzoar, pearl, and other rare articles were found.”

It is estimated that around 1730, under Sultan Hussin Kamaluddin of Brunei regained control over the countries from Sarawak Proper from Sambas including the Melanau areas.

=== 19th century ===
When James Brooke was granted the title Rajah of Sarawak in 1841, the territories of Melanau people from the Rejang river to Bintulu was still under the Brunei kingdom. When a long conflict between the Pangiran Dipa and Pangeran Matusin in Mukah was reaching its peak, it resulted led to a crisis point for James Brooke. Events like blockage of sago supply from Melanau regions to the factories in Kuching and the killing of Charles Fox and Henry Steele became a point for Sir James Brooke to obtain from Sultan Abdul Momin the permission to interfere in 1857. Furthermore, the pirate activities in the Melanau areas carried out by the Sakarang and Saribas were diminishing the livelihood of the Melanaus as well as other local communities In Spencer St James account of the piratical activities;

"It is evident, from the remains of the deserted towns and villages that we saw in their districts, that the population was formerly much greater than we found it during our expeditions to protect their industrious people. We heard of almost monthly attacks on one or other of their villages, and a few weeks passed without the Milanows having to add many to the list of their murdered relatives."

Finally, in 1861, the Sultan gave a lease to James Brooke the territories between Samarahan river to Tanjung Kidurong.

Since the 14th century, the Melanaus have never been united under their racial political entity and controlled by Brunei for about 500 years and the White Rajahs for about 100 years. This contributed to the disparity in the language differences among the Melanau people who were widespread along the coastline of Northwest Borneo. Yet the Melanau language has retained much of its authenticity making it separable from the Malay language despite heavy influence from the Malay language itself.

== Divisions ==
Grouping-wise, the Melanaus can be classified into the following;

- Melanau Matu-Daro
- Melanau Bruit
- Melanau Seduan
- Melanau Dalat
- Melanau Oya
- Melanau Igan
- Melanau Mukah
- Melanau Belawai-Rajang
- Melanau Balingian
- Melanau Miri
- Melanau Bintulu
- Melanau Segan

The largest group is the Matu-Daro. Each group has its characteristic dialect, but they all share the same cultural and linguistic background. An exception is the Melanau Bintulu dialect, which can hardly be understood by speakers of other dialects and is thought by many linguists to hardly fit into the Melanau language grouping. This tribe is also known as "Vaie" whose language is very similar to Punan Lovuk Pandan and Punan Bah. Their early establishment were from Lavang and Segan riverine areas.

The Melanau languages have been divided into the following five groups

- Central, consists of dialects ranging from Mukah-Oya, Dalat, Balingian, Bruit, Igan, Segalang, Segahan, Siteng and Prehan.
- Matu-Daro
- Kanowit-Sungai Tanjong
- Sibu, consists of dialects from Seduan and Banyok.
- Seru (extinct)
- Kapit

Another Melanau group worth mentioning and including is the Melanau Igan. They live in kampungs by the Igan River, e.g. Kampung Skrang, Kampung Tengah, Kampung Hilir, that border the Mukah – (Matu-Daro) district. The main language is Melanau. However, some speak a local Malay dialect. This group of Melanau is probably all Muslim. They have mainly adopted Malay culture while preserving some aspects of Melanau culture. It is believed that this group was originally Malays who settled in the area. However, intermarriage with Melanaus over many generations produced new generations who considered themselves Melanau.

Similar to the Igan Melanaus ancestral beginnings, many Melanaus who had migrated to different areas in Sarawak experienced the same transformation. A group of Matu Melanaus settled in the Bintawa area in Kuching after World War 2. However, their offspring, even though mostly Melanaus by blood, normally do not speak the language and are considered Malays. However, as a point of interest, the new secondary school built in Bintawa, Kuching in 2007 is named SMK Matu Baru. Many areas in Greater Kuching, notably in the neighbourhoods of Petra Jaya, Lundu, Samarahan and Santubong do have a significant Melanau population. In addition, Sibu, Miri and Bintulu are also places or towns where there is a significant Melanau population.

However, the 'Bin' which means "son of" and 'Binti' which means "daughter of" as given in all their names (be they are Muslim, Christian, or "Likou") had probably confused the census workers (read the following paragraph). One of the reasons the Muslim Melanau 'migrated' to become Malay is that during the registration of birth of the newborns, they are automatically being assumed as Malay if the parents don't inform the registration officer of their racial preference.

== Population ==
Percentage population of Melanau in Sarawak, according to 2020 census, based on state constituencies.

According to the statistics from the state's statistics department, in 2014, there are 132,600 who consider themselves Melanau, making it the fifth-largest ethnic group in Sarawak (after Iban, Chinese, Malays, and Bidayuh).

Even though a minority in Sarawak, Melanau forms a large part of Sarawak's political sphere, 5 out of 6 of Yang di-Pertua Negeri of Sarawak is of Melanau ethnicity including the 7th Yang di-Pertua Tun Pehin Abdul Taib Mahmud and 2 out of 6 of Chief Ministers of Sarawak are ethnic Melanau.

The population dynamics of the Melanau people are as follows:

Year	1876	1939	1947	1960	1970	1980	1991	2000	2010	2020
Population	30,000 (Note: estimation)	36,772	35,560	44,661	53,234	75,126	96,000	109,882	123,410	125,581

== Culture, religion and economy ==
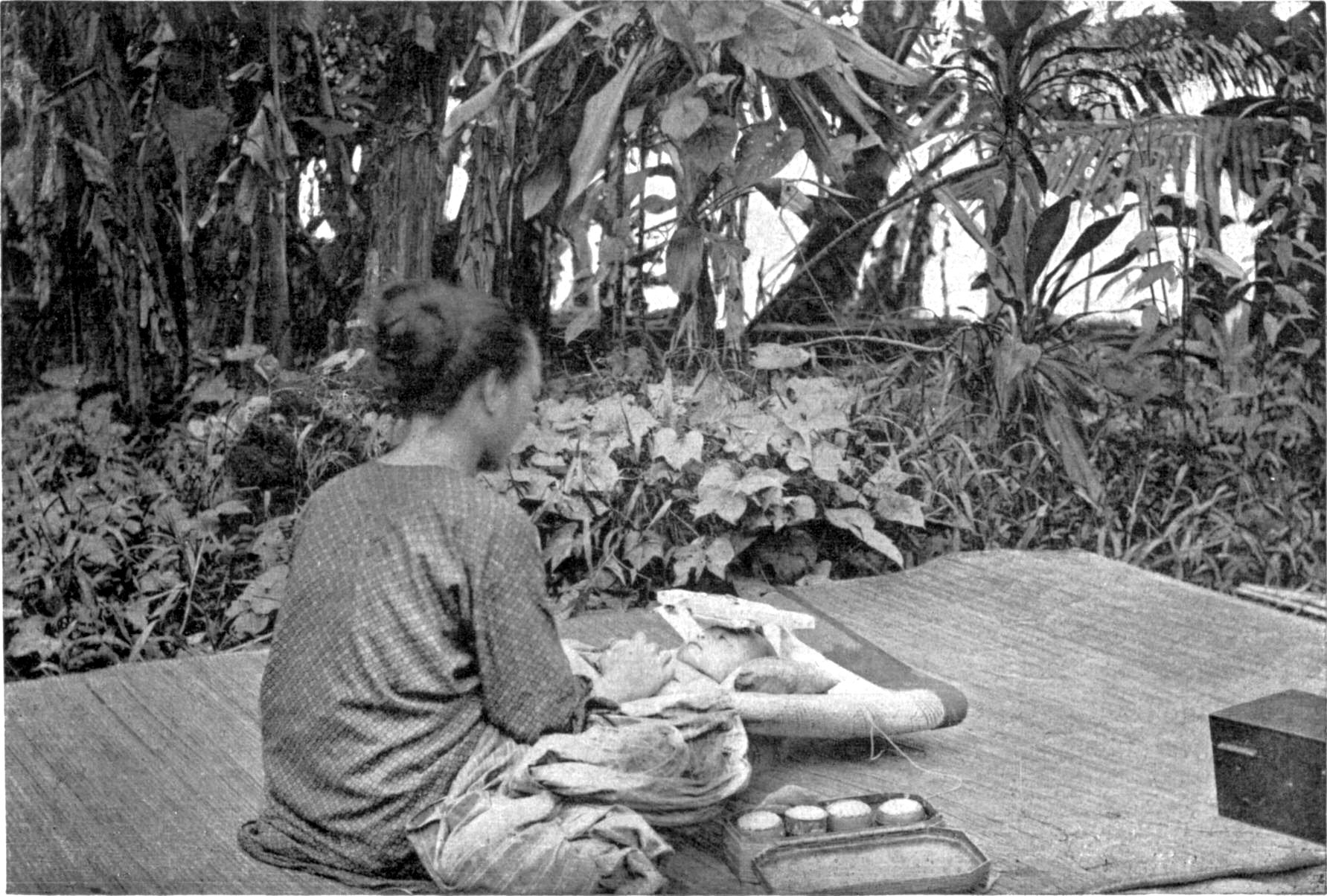
When a Melanau child is about a month old its head is placed in a wooden device called Tadal, the object of which is to flatten the forehead and so make the face as near the shape of a full moon as possible. The pressure is applied only while the child is asleep. 1912.

The Melanau were traditionally fishermen as well as padi and sago farmers. The Melanaus from Paloh were described by Spencer St John are salt producers in the 19th century. Some were skilled boat builders. They used to live in tall stilt and longhouses, but nowadays, they live in Malaysian kampung-style houses (individual & separated houses). Because of religious similarity, the majority of Melanaus live socially and culturally like the rest of the Malays in Malaysia.

The Melanau are one of the rare ethnic groups in Malaysia to have a population that remains more or less constant in numbers. This is because the Muslim Melanaus that have migrated to bigger towns in Sarawak have "automatically" become "Malays", especially during the National Census Operation as their names (and many times the language the elders use with their children at homes) are indistinguishable from those of the local Sarawak Malays. This has helped the Malay population of Sarawak to have significantly increased in the census.

Most Melanaus have a 'Bin' (son of) and 'Binti' (daughter of) in their names similar to the Malays and it is also likely that the Christian Melanaus too were designated as Malays in the census.

The 2010 Malaysian Population Census showed the Melanaus population in Sarawak, Malaysia was about 123,410. They make up the 5th largest ethnic group in Sarawak, after the Ibans, Chinese, Malays, and Bidayuh. The continuous inter-marriage between the Melanau and other races in Malaysia has also caused the disappearance of the Melanau identity. Data from some private research estimated that the actual Melanau population (in Malaysia and outside Malaysia) is much higher.

Being migrants in the early days, Melanaus are found almost everywhere in Sarawak. Sadly, though their children know their roots, many of them cannot speak or even understand their Melanau language. Intentionally or unintentionally, many of them have registered themselves as other races, mostly as Malays. In some cases, their parents, both Melanaus, prefer to speak Malay or English to their children. This language trend is mainly found in the towns and cities in Sarawak. There has been little effort done to preserve the Melanau dialects and to teach the current Melanau generation continuous usage of their dialects.

The gradual disappearance of the Melanau cultures and dialects is further aggravated by the absence of qualified Melanau staff members handling the documentation on the Melanau culture and history in the 'Majlis Adat Istiadat' department in Sarawak. This department is involved in the preservation and documentation of the cultures and histories of the various ethnic groups in Sarawak. The Melanau are slowly being absorbed into other cultural groups. The Melanau Kaul festival will only serve as a reminder of the Melanau Pagan ritual.

=== Religion ===
Religions of Melanaus
Religion	Percent
Islam	73.14%
Christianity	18.99%
Folk religion	6.24%
Other religions	0.2%
No religion / Unknown	1.43%

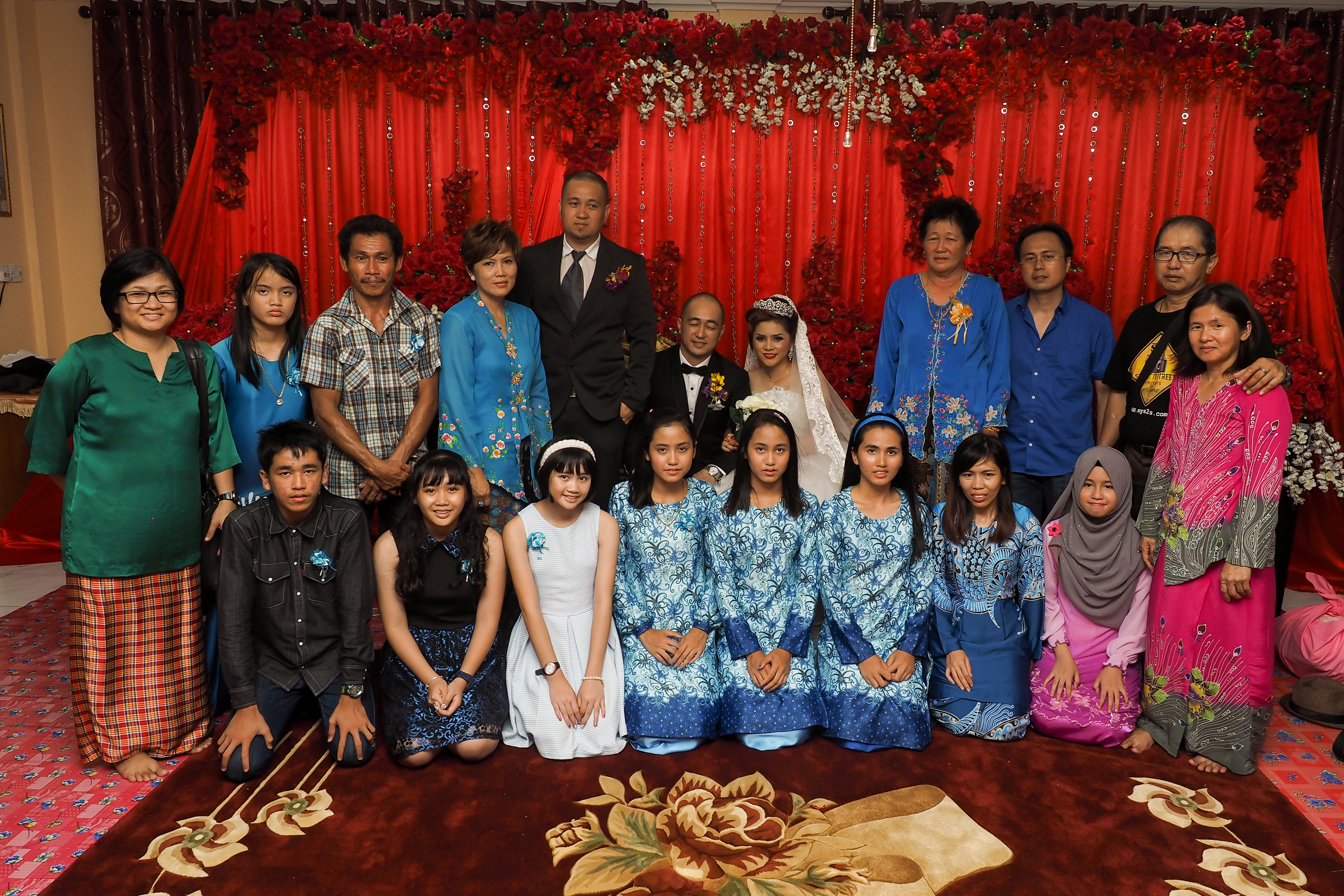
A Melanau family portrait during a wedding ceremony.

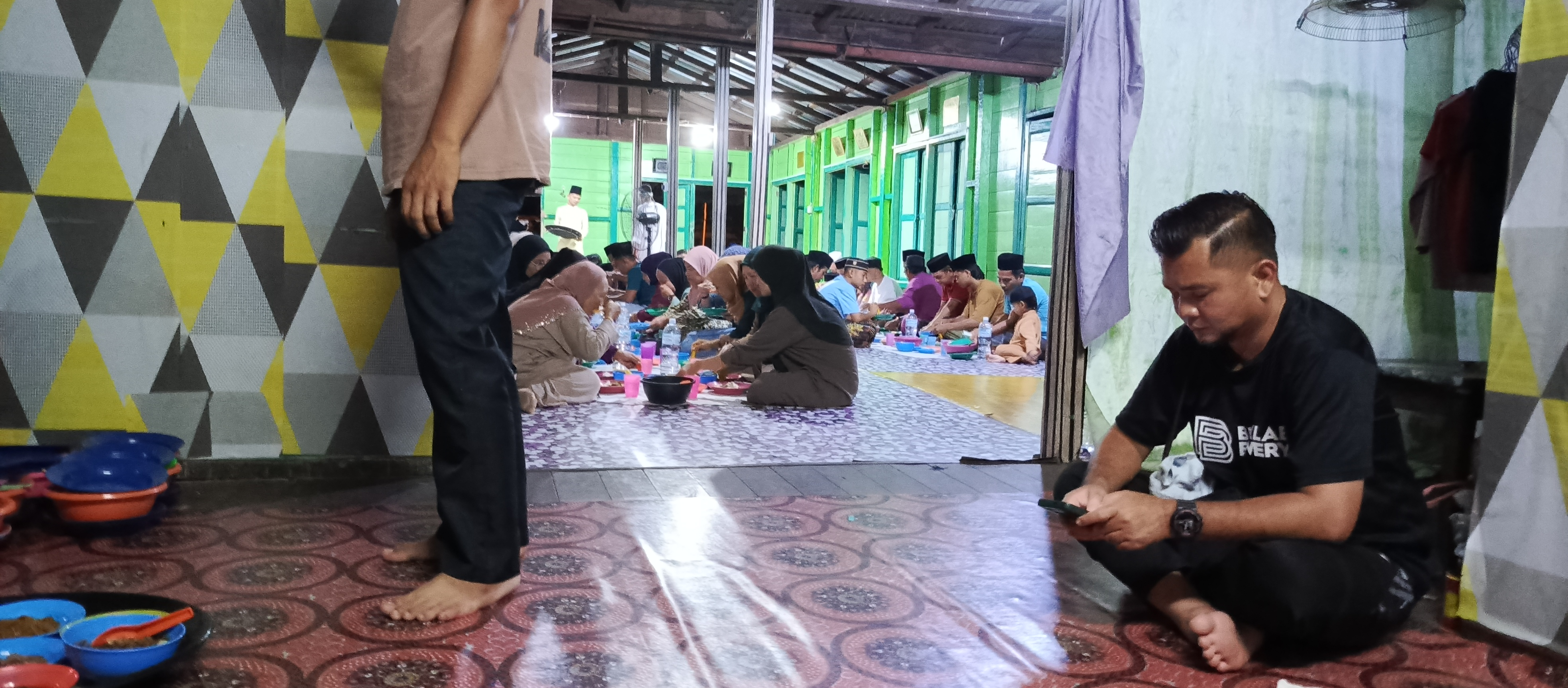
Tahlil is performed to remember the deceased. Kampung Bawang, Matu

While originally animists, the majority of the Melanaus are now Muslim, although some of them, especially among the Melanau Mukah, and Dalat are Christian. Nonetheless, many still celebrate traditional rites such as the annual Kaul Festival. Despite their different beliefs and religions, the Melanaus, like other East Malaysians (Sabah and Sarawak) are very tolerant of each other and are proud of their tolerance. One can still come across a Melanau family with different children in the family embracing Christianity and Islam while their parents still have strong animist beliefs.

=== Food ===
The Melanaus have unique food such as jungle ferns, umai, fresh fish products, and siet, (edible sago palm weevil larva). There is a variety of sago-based dishes such as the linut, sago balls, and the famous tebaloi, also known as sago and coconut biscuits.

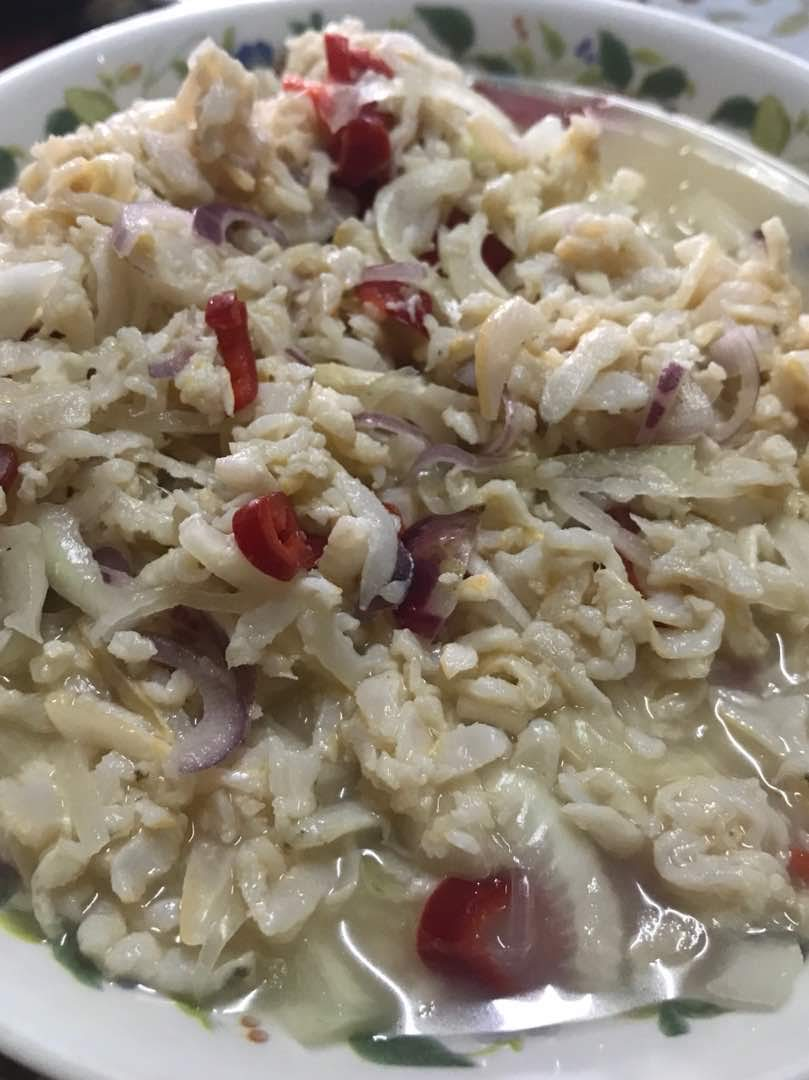
Umai, a dish of sliced raw fish with a mixture of onions, chillies, salt and lime juice.

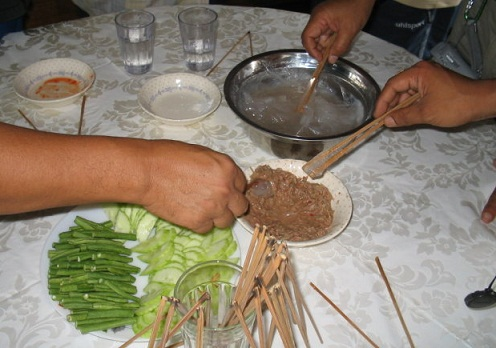
Linut - a sticky concoction made from sago starch.

== Melanau calendar ==
The Melanau have their own calendar which begins in March. The New Year is celebrated during the Kaul Festival.

== In popular culture ==
- The film, Sumpahan Jerunei (Curse of the Jerunei), a local horror film which was released in 2023 and revolves around burial ritual of the Melanau nobility back in the 13th century. The movie was filmed in many areas in Sarawak, including Mukah, Siburan and Santubong.
