= Alena Murang =

- Lipang
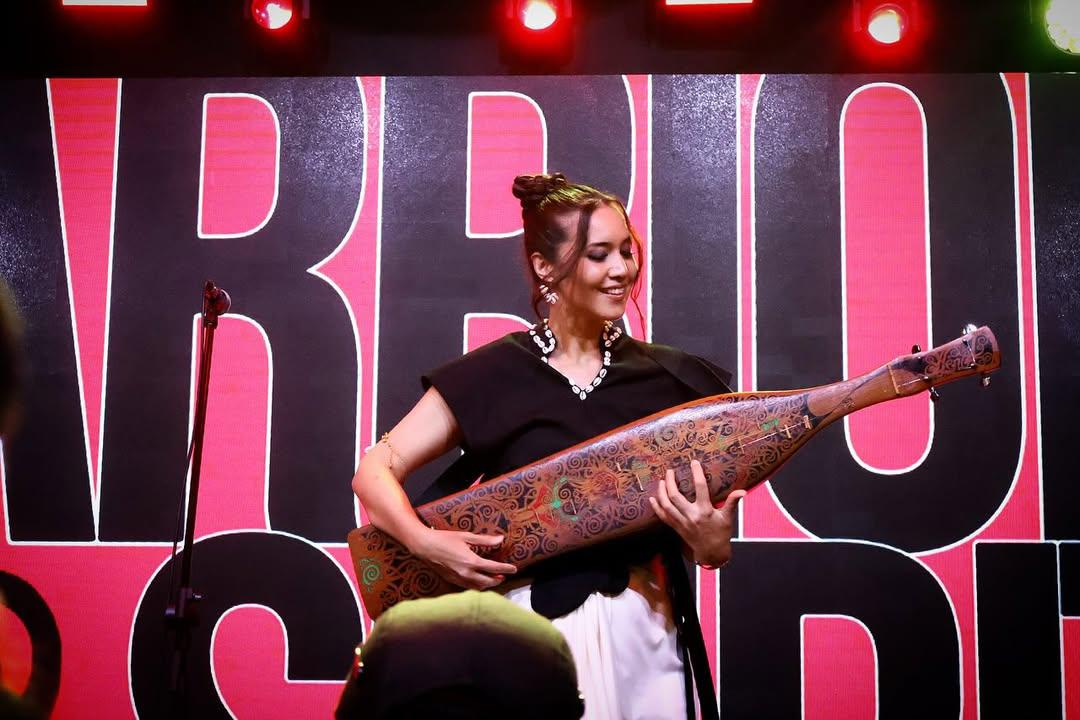
- Alena Murang in Borneo Native Festival 2026
- Born: Alena Ose' Murang; 1989 (age 36–37); Kuching, Sarawak, Malaysia
- Education: University of Manchester (BSc)
- Occupations: Singer; lyricist; composer; music producer; visual artist
- Years active: 2016–present
- Height: 180 cm (5 ft 11 in)
- Musical career
- Genres: World; Folk; Rock
- Instruments: Vocals; sape
- Label: Wind Music (2020–present)
- Website: www.alenamurang.com

Alena Murang (born 1989) is a Malaysian singer-songwriter, sape player, visual artist and educator who sings in endangered languages including Kelabit and Kenyah. She is one of the first women to play the sape, a lute instrument from Borneo traditionally (pre-1930s) reserved for male healers.

== Early life and background ==
Murang was born in Kuching, Sarawak to her retired civil servant father Datu Ose Murang, of Kelabit heritage and an anthropologist mother, Datin Dr. Valerie Mashman who is an Englishwoman of Italian descent. She started playing the sape at the age of 10, learning from renowned sape master Matthew Ngau Jau. She graduated with a First Class BSc (Hons) management degree from the Manchester Business School, University of Manchester. She went on to work in management consulting at PricewaterhouseCoopers, focusing on environmental sustainability, before leaving to study visual arts for a year in Singapore. Prior to pursuing music full-time, she worked as strategy manager for not-for-profit organization, Teach for Malaysia.

On June 10, 2024, she received a certificate confirming her Sarawakian native status from the Malaysian government, which allows her to inherit native land.

== Career ==
Murang made her debut as an artiste in 2016 with the release of EP, Flight. She never formally studied music, but has been learning the dance, songs, and music from her elders. She has performed at many renowned world music festivals including the SXSW (USA), Colors of Ostrava (Czech Republic), Paris Fashion Week (France), Rudolstadt-Festival (Germany), OzAsia Festival (Australia), and Rainforest World Music Festival (Malaysia). She was a youth representative at the UNESCO Youth Forum in Paris, and UNESCO Asia-Pacific for her work in intangible cultural heritage.

She was listed in Tatler Asia's list of Most Influential Malaysia in 2021, and Gen.T Malaysia in 2018 & 2019. In March 2023, she held her first painting exhibition Colours of the Highlands at the Hoan Gallery at La Promenade Mall, Kuching.

In May 2024, in collaboration with Sabahan singer-songwriter Velvet Aduk, she released the track "Bejugit Betanda Menari" (Dance Dance Dance) for the annual Gawai Dayak holiday. On September 7, she participated in The Sounds of Borneo, a concert with the Malaysian Symphony Orchestra featuring solo artists such as Murang, Velvet Aduk, and Marsha Milan.

In 2025, during the launching of Sarawak Biodiversity Policy Statement and Master Plan, she was appointed as Sarawak's Biodiversity Ambassador. At the Expo 2025, Alena is featured as one of Malaysia's iconic figures at the Malaysia Pavilion.

== Discography ==
=== Studio albums ===
- Flight (EP) (2016)
- Sky Songs (2021)

=== Singles ===
Singles

Year	Title	Ref(s)	Notes
2022	"Many Tomorrows"		The song and music video is a collaboration with the Society for Cancer Advocacy and Awareness Kuching (SCAN) in conjunction with World Cancer Day.
2025	"Borneo Rain"		The song was recorded in Kelabit, Malay and instrumental versions, and was released in time for the International Mother Earth Day.
2025	"Jaga Alam"		The song was released in connection with World Biodiversity Day and the Gawai Dayak festivities.
2026	"Sekunuh Kamih"		The song is a tribute to the oral traditions of the Kelabit people of Borneo. Spanning three generations, the track features rare 1980s cassette recordings of Alena’s family alongside ancient warrior epics.

Collaboration

Year	Title	Artist(s)	Album	Ref(s)
2024	"War Cry"	Marsha Milan and Velvet Aduk	Single	
2024	"Bejugit Betanda Menari"	Velvet Aduk	Single	
2024	"Anun Bala"	Sauljaljui, Mathew Ngau Jau	Single	

=== Concerts, showcases and tours ===
==== Solo ====
- Live in Kuala Lumpur : Alena Murang Sky Songs, Petaling Jaya Performing Arts Centre (PJPAC), Petaling Jaya (2023)

==== As headliner ====
- Pentas Seni Merdeka: Muzik Dan Tarian Borneo Malaysia, Jalan Raja, Kuala Lumpur (2022)
- Sounds of Borneo (with Marsha Milan and Velvet Aduk, accompanied by Malaysian Philharmonic Orchestra), Petronas Philharmonic Hall, Kuala Lumpur (2024)
- Borneo Beatz Live in KL (in conjunction with the Borneo Native Festival 2025), Pasar Seni, Kuala Lumpur (2025)
- The Crocker Range Festival, Dataran Keningau, Keningau (2025)

==== As supporting act ====
- Rainforest World Music Festival, Sarawak Cultural Village, Kuching (2016, 2021, 2022, 2024)
- The Roar for Life Virtual Concert, Virtual (2020)
- 2021 World Music Festival @Taiwan, Taipei Dajia Riverside Park, Taiwan (2021)
- Te Aratini: Festival of Indigenous and Tribal People, Dubai Expo, United Arab Emirates (2021)
- OH!Tenang with Alena Murang, Gurney Plaza, Penang (2024)
- ESTRANGED Apa Khabar Teman?, Persada Johor International Convention Centre, Johor (2024)
- Ombak Festival, Desaru Coast, Johor (2024)

== Filmography ==
Film and television
Year	Title	Role	Ref(s)	Notes
2019	Small Island Big Song: An Oceanic Songline	Herself		A musical cinematographic project featuring over a hundred musicians across 16 island nations of the Pacific and Indian Oceans.
2019	Iman Untuk Bulan	Bulan		Television movie for Astro First.
2022	Roads To Our Heritage	Key cast and writer		A six-part documentary journey of the companionship of Sabah rock band Estranged together with Alena Murang and Dr. Nadia Widyawati from Universiti Teknologi MARA music faculty discovering the heritage of traditional instrument across Sabah and Sarawak.

== Awards and accolades ==
Year	Award	Category	Nominated work	Result	Ref(s)
2020	Buenos Aires Music Video Festival	Best International Video	Midang Midang	Nominated	
2020	Buenos Aires Music Video Festival	Best Styling	Midang Midang	Won	
2021	UK's International Music Video Awards	Best Asia & Pacific Music Video	Warrior Spirit	Won	
2021	UK's International Music Video Awards	Best Costume	Warrior Spirit	Honorable Mention	
2021	Los Angeles Film Awards	Special Jury Award	Warrior Spirit	Won	
2021	Rome International Movie Awards	Best Music Video	Warrior Spirit	Won	
2021	New York International Film Awards	Best Music Video	Warrior Spirit	Won	
2021	New York International Film Awards	Best Ethnographic Film	Warrior Spirit	Won	
2021	Buenos Aires Music Video Festival	Best World Music Video	Warrior Spirit	Won	
2026	Global Music Awards	Outstanding Achievement	Sekunuh Kamih	Silver (silver)	
