= Borneo Native Festival =

- Venue: Central Market, Kuala Lumpur
- Organised by: Kuala Lumpur Arts Enthusiasts Association
- Goal: To promote culture and diversity of East Malaysia coinciding the celebration of Kaamatan and Gawai Dayak

Borneo Native Festival (BNF) is an annual cultural festival held in Malaysia since 2022. The festival is organised by the Kuala Lumpur Arts Enthusiasts Association (Sukaseni) to promote the diversity of the culture in East Malaysia.

It is held in Central Market, Kuala Lumpur annually, while in 2026, Dayabumi Complex has become another venue of the event.

== Background ==
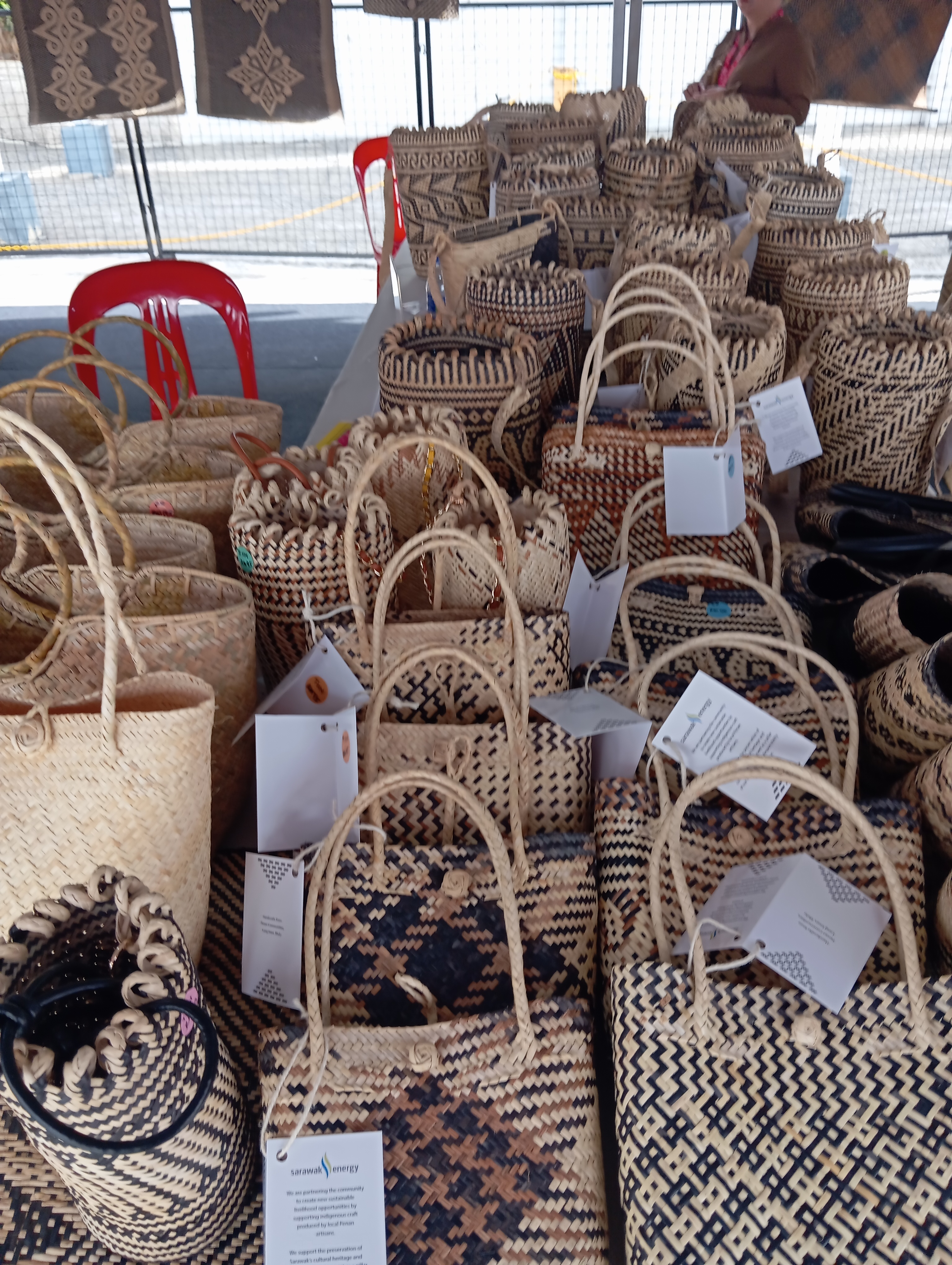
Handicrafts sold in one of the booth in Borneo Native Festival 2026

The organizers stated that the establishment of the festival was motivated by the presence of a significant Sarawakian and Sabahan community in Kuala Lumpur. The event was created to promote Bornean cultural products, including textiles, rattan crafts, food, and beverages, while also introducing aspects of the Kaamatan and Gawai Dayak celebration to the broader Malaysian public. While the festival is held on dates which approaches these two celebrations, it is also reported that the festival is incorporating the element of Regatta Lepa and Pesta Kaul.

Apart from promoting these products, the festival promotes Bornean music through performances by artists from Sabah and Sarawak. Programmes featured at the event include traditional indigenous music like sape' and dance as well as contemporary musical performances, reflecting the diversity and modern development of Bornean cultural expression.

This event also features a cultural parade showcasing traditional attires from various ethnics of Borneo which is held from Dataran Merdeka to Central Market.

== Dates ==
Year	Date	Ref
2022	20-22 May	
2023	19-21 May	
2024	24-26 May	
2025	23-25 May	
2026	22-24 May	

== Gallery ==
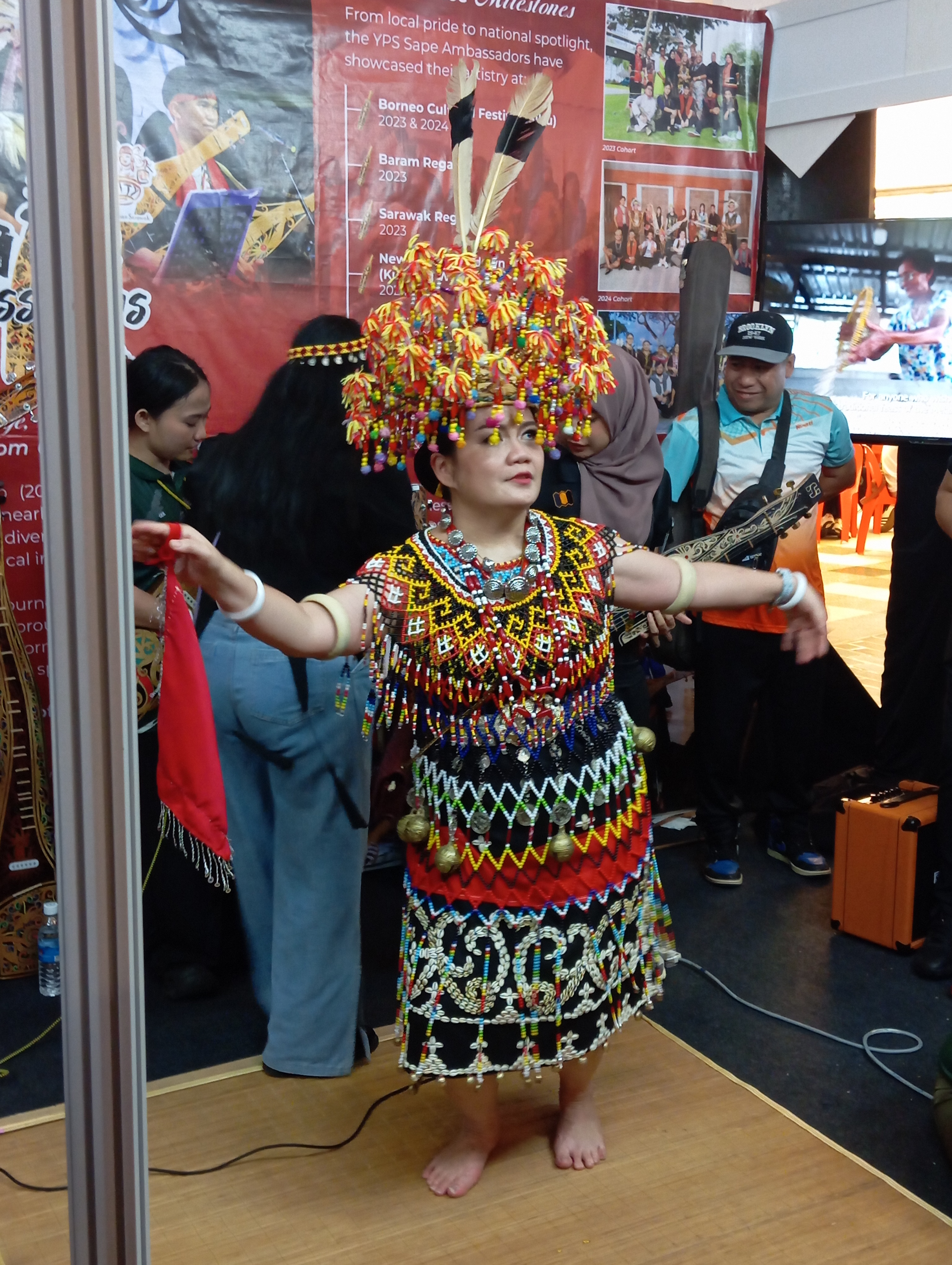
A lady in Ngepan Batang Rajang, a traditional female Iban attire from Rajang River area, dancing in a booth during Borneo Native Festival 2026.

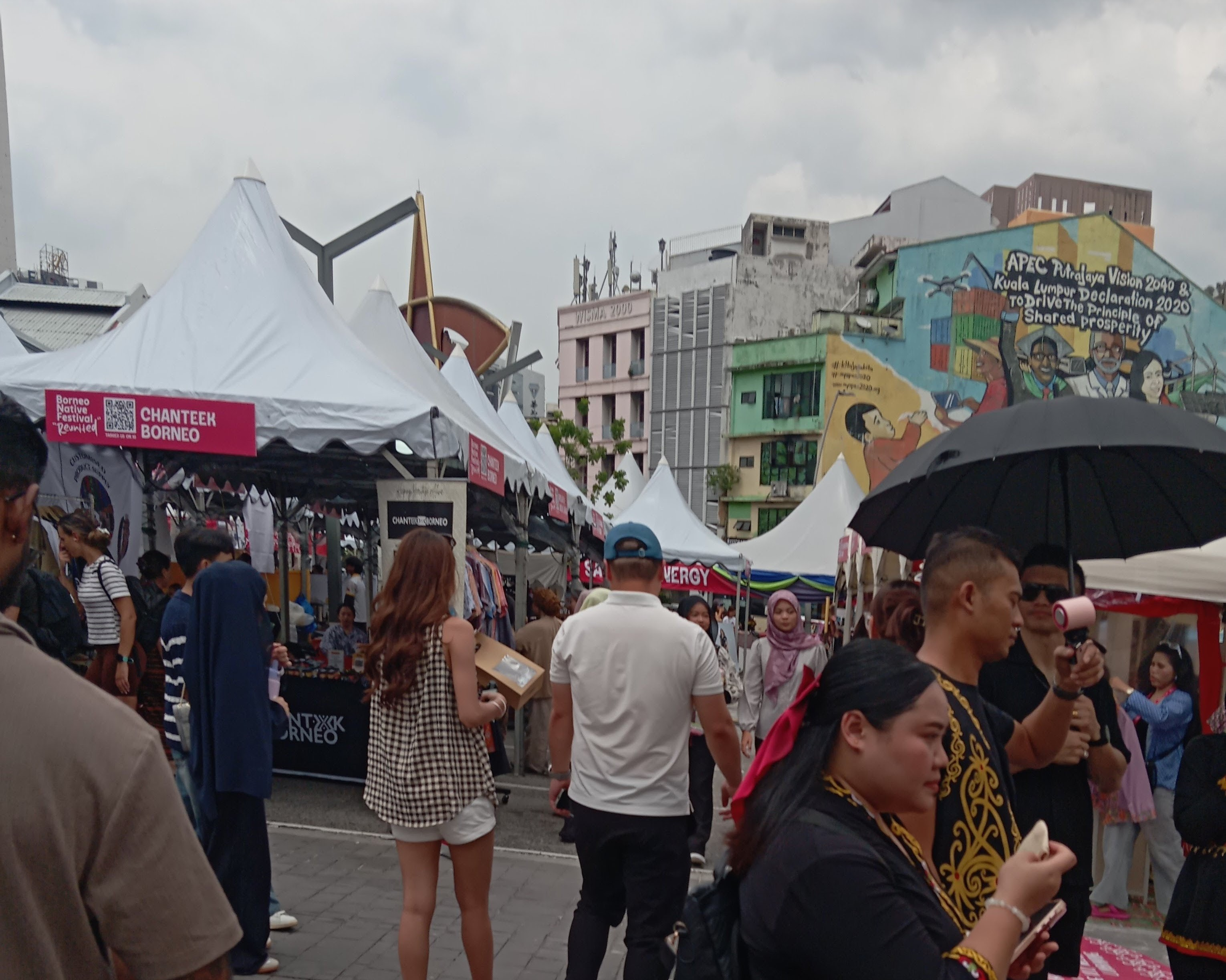
Several stalls in the Central Market, Kuala Lumpur during Borneo Native Festival 2026

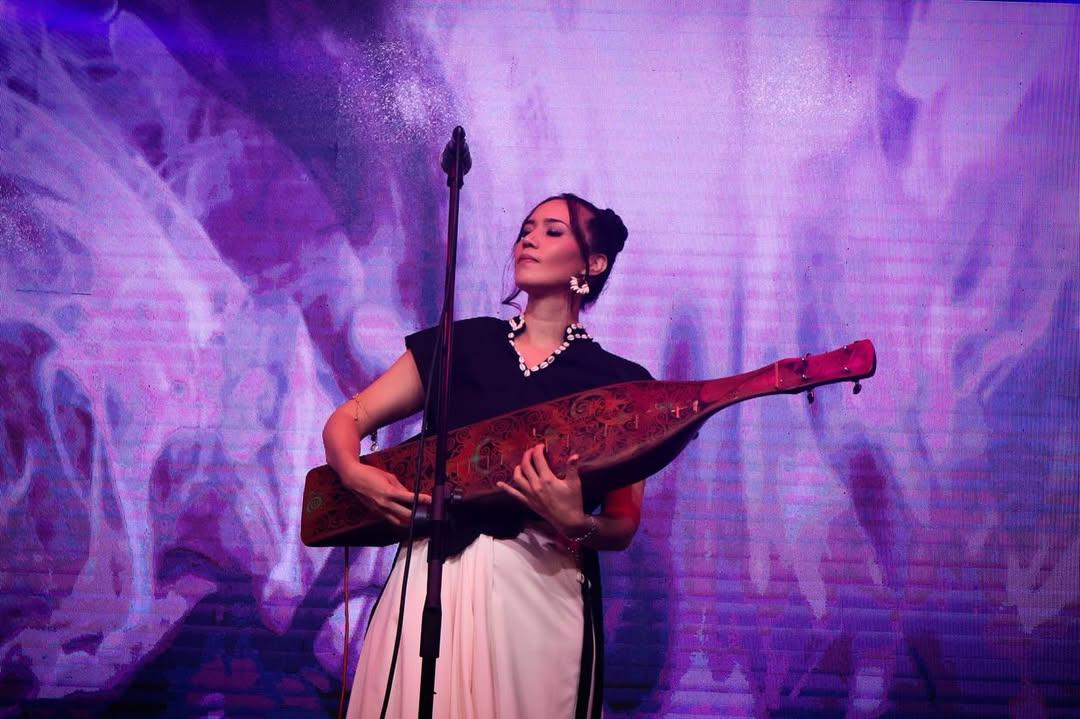
Alena Murang performing sape' during Borneo Native Festival 2026
