= Sapek =

Sapek may refer to:

- Sapeh, a traditional lute of the Kenyah and Kayan peoples of Indonesia
- Sapeque or Vietnamese cash, coinage historically used in Vietnam
