= Borneo Jazz Festival =

Jazz festival in Malaysia

Coordinates: 4°24′10″N 113°59′36″E

Borneo Jazz Festival Festival Jazz Borneo
- Status: Active
- Genre: Music Festivals
- Frequency: Annually
- Venue: ParkCity Everly Hotel (2006-2017); Coco Cabana, Marina Bay (2018-present)
- Locations: Miri, Sarawak, Malaysia
- Country: Malaysia
- Years active: 2006-present
- Organiser: No Black Tie
- Website: http://jazzborneo.com/

Borneo Jazz Festival is a 2-night festival of 4 performances in each night by local and international jazz musicians at Parkcity Everly hotel in Miri, Sarawak. The festival is one of the longest running Jazz festival in the region. The 2019 edition of the festival will be held on 19 to 21 July.

== History ==
Borneo Jazz Festival was started in 2006. The event is organised by the Sarawak Tourism Board, endorsed by Tourism Malaysia and is jointly supported by the Ministry of Tourism and Culture, Malaysia and Ministry of Tourism, Sarawak. The festival was formerly known as Miri International Jazz Festival before it was renamed to Borneo Jazz Festival in 2011.

The Borneo Jazz is wholly owned by Sarawak Tourism Board and organised by No Black Tie.

== Programme ==
In 2018 the festival introduced Borneo Jazz Talent Search as part of their musical outreach programme. For 2019 edition, the festival’s music outreach will expand to include the Borneo Jazz DJ Search.

== Performers ==
Lineups of the festival since 2014 are:

Year	Lineups	Attendance	Venue
2008	2008 performers: inventielke (Netherlands); havana sax (Cuba); diamond dave and the doodaddies (Australia); -		
2014	2014 performers: Anthony Strong (United Kingdom); Brassballett (Germany); Diana Liu (Malaysia); Iriao (Georgia); JuncOFunc (Malaysia); Mario Canonge (Martinique); Vocal Sampling (Cuba); YK Samarinda (Indonesia)	8,000	ParkCity Everly Hotel
2015	2015 performers: Anthony Strong (United Kingdom); Dirty Dozen Brass Band (New Orleans, USA); Lluis Caloma (Spain); Jump 4 Joy (Sweden), Mo’ Blow–Gimme The Boots (Germany); Shafiee Obe and All The Best (Sarawak); The Doodaddis (Australia); The Nylons (Canada)	4,000	ParkCity Everly Hotel
2016	2016 performers: USM Mini Big Band (Malaysia) (Youth Programme); Klazz Brothers & Cuba Percussion; Raw Earth (Singapore); API (Malaysia/India); O Sister! (Spain); Funkatorie (Malaysia); Yuichiro Tokuda (Japan); Manou Gallo Groove Orchestra (Ivory Coast/Belgium); The Rad Trads (New York, USA)	TBA	ParkCity Everly Hotel
2017	2017 performers: Fluorescent Collective (Italy, Malaysia, USA, India); The Cape Jazz Band (South Africa); Delgres (Guadeloupe, France); CaboCuba Jazz (The Netherlands); Michael Simon’s Asian Connection (Malaysia, Taiwan, The Netherlands); Laila Baili (Canada); Idang Rasjidi Syndicate (Indonesia); Osaka Monaurail (Japan)	TBA	ParkCity Everly Hotel
2018	2018 performers: Tony Lakatos (Germany); Christ Stalk (France); Grzegorz Karnas Formula (Poland); Roby Lakatos (Belgium); Cecilia Brunori (Italy); Denis Chang (Canada); QSound (USA); Isao Miyoshi (Japan); Gaoyang Li (China); Jeremy Monteiro (Singapore); Datuk Zainal Abidin (Malaysia); Michael Veerapen (Malaysia); Dasha Logan (Malaysia); Bihzhu (Malaysia); Mei Lin Hii (Malaysia); Elvira Arul (Malaysia); Pete Kallang (Malaysia); Zee Avi (Malaysia)	TBA	Coco Cabana, Marina Bay, Miri
2019	2019 performers: Alberto Marsico Trio (Italy); Alina Ramirez (Mexico); Arabyrd (Sarawak, Malaysia) - BORNEO HIP HOP; Asyraf Hardy (Sarawak, Malaysia)- BORNEO HIP HOP; Benzooloo (Sabah, Malaysia)- BORNEO HIP HOP; Chanda Rule (USA); Christy Smith (USA); Clinton Chua (Sarawak, Malaysia); Dasha Logan (Malaysia); Diego Borotti (Italy); DJ Maestro (Netherlands); Fox Capture Plan (Japan); Gideon Yogan (Malaysia); IRESON (Mexico); Jasmine Chen (China); Jay Jackson (USA); Joe Balanjiu Jr (Malaysia); Joe Flizzow (Malaysia); Julian Chan (Malaysia); Julian Chan Jazz Orchestra (Malaysia); Kirk Lightsey Trio (USA/ Malaysia); Lewis Pragasam (Malaysia); Marques Young (USA); Michael Veerapen (Malaysia); NJWA (Malaysia); Pete Kallang (Sarawak, Malaysia); Rainbow Children (Malaysia); Robo Jupiter (USA); Zed Peace (Brunei)- BORNEO HIP HOP	TBA	Coco Cabana, Marina Bay, Miri

== Attendance ==
The festival attendance has grown steadily from 3,000 spectators in 2006 to 8,000 spectators in 2014.
