= Plaza Aurora =

Shopping mall in Kuching, Sarawak, Malaysia

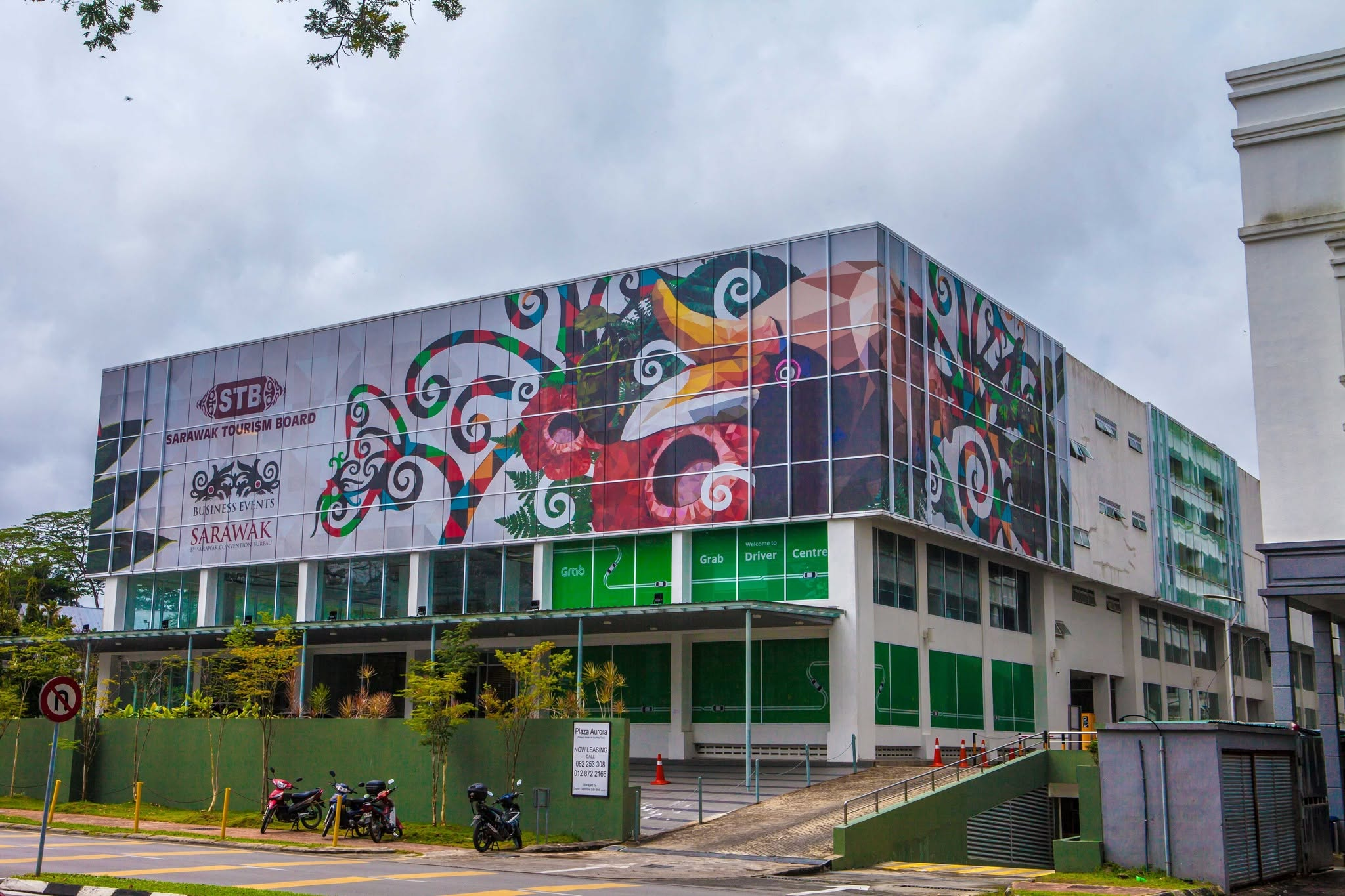
- Plaza Aurora, featuring Sarawak Tourism Board office (2024)
- Location: Kuching, Kuching Division, Sarawak, Malaysia
- Coordinates: 1.5560°N 110.3445°E
- Address: 12B, Jalan McDougall, Taman Budaya, 93000 Kuching, Sarawak, Malaysia
- Opened: 1981; 45 years ago
- Renovated: 2012; 14 years ago
- Previous names: Kuching Plaza
- Owner: Kuching Plaza Sdn. Bhd.
- Floors: 4 (shoplots)
- Website: https://facebook.com/p/Plaza-Auora-61569958349446/

Plaza Aurora (formerly Kuching Plaza) is a commercial complex located on Jalan McDougall in Kuching, Sarawak, Malaysia, owned by Kuching Plaza Sdn. Bhd..

Completed in 1981, Kuching Plaza was the first shopping mall in Kuching to install escalators. The building was initially constructed with three storeys and later expanded to four. The mall was once noted for its sales of advanced computer software. However, due to poor maintenance, its popularity declined significantly within about a decade, and it was fully closed by the late 1990s.

In 2012, the complex underwent major renovation works by MinWee Architect. It reopened in 2017 under the new name Plaza Aurora (merged between Kuching Plaza and Aurora Hotel (former name of Merdeka Palace Hotel & Suites)). During 2018, Sarawak Tourism Board relocated its office to Plaza Aurora, establishing it as a one-stop tourism centre.

== Gallery ==
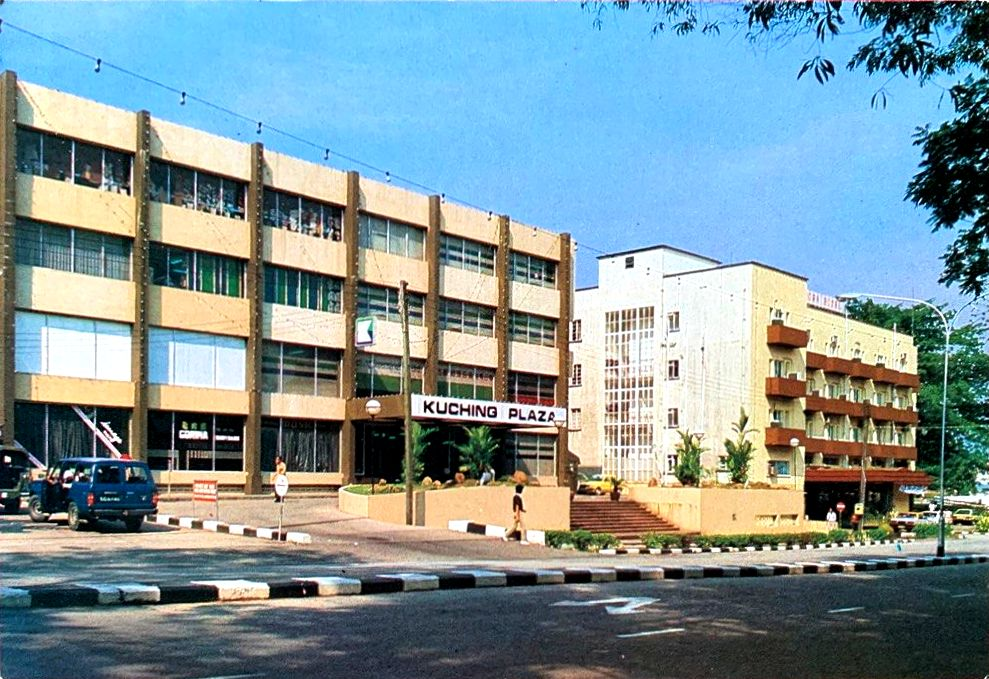
Kuching Plaza (left) and Aurora Hotel (right) (1980s)
