= Sarawak Tourism Board =

Agency of Sarawak State Government

- Lembaga Pelancongan Sarawak

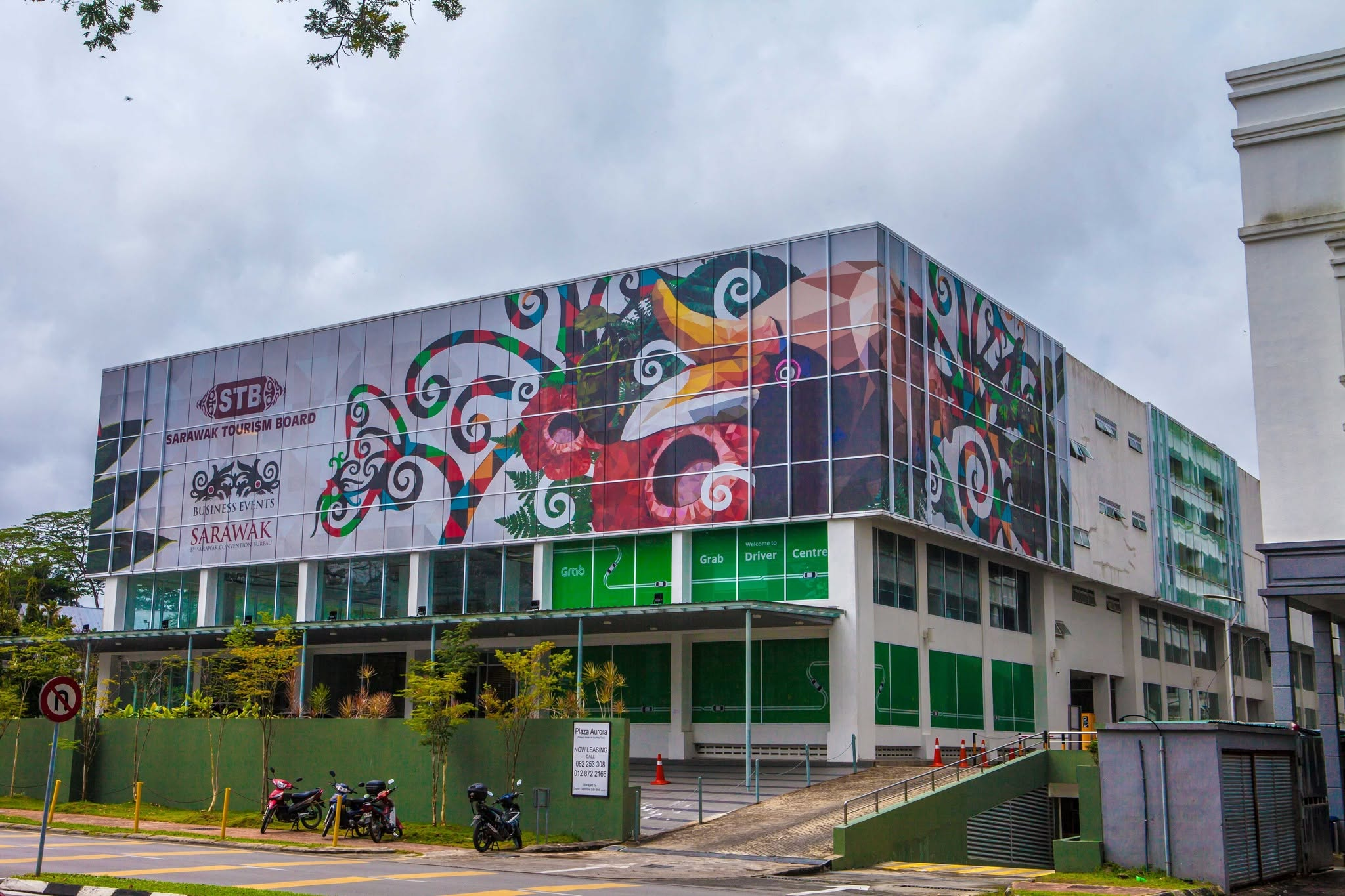
- Sarawak Tourism Board office (2024)

Agency overview
- Formed: 12 November 1994; 31 years ago
- Jurisdiction: Government of Sarawak
- Headquarters: Level 4, Plaza Aurora, Jalan McDougall, 93000 Kuching, Sarawak
- Agency executives: Dennis Ngau, Chairman; Sharzede Datu Salleh Askor, CEO
- Parent agency: Ministry of Tourism, Creative Industry and Performing Arts Sarawak
- Website: www.sarawaktourism.com

The Sarawak Tourism Board (STB; Malay: Lembaga Pelancongan Sarawak), or generally known as Sarawak Tourism, is an agency of the Sarawak State Government operating under the purview of the Ministry of Tourism, Creative Industry and Performing Arts. Its primary responsibility is the marketing and promotion of tourism for the state.

== History ==
Sarawak Tourism Board (STB) was established on 12 November 1994 under the Sarawak Tourism Board (Incorporation) Ordinance. It began operations on 15 June 1995 with the official launching beamed via a video conference in Kuching and officiated by the then-Chief Minister of Sarawak, Abdul Taib Mahmud. At the time it began operations, the STB's office is located at Wisma Satok. The board's primary task is to increase tourist arrivals to Sarawak, while plays a pivotal role in promoting the state as a premier tourist destination and managing its tourism-related activities. It also actively promoting the state as a meeting and conference destination.

Later, the STB began to initiate new marketing ideas to promote Sarawak's image abroad and taking a three-pronged approach to promote Sarawak by emphasising the state's culture, adventure and nature. On 11 November 1995, the STB went online with the launching of its Internet Worldwide Web-site, which has garnered a total of 1,600 visitors. The STB also spent RM5 million to promote Sarawak overseas as well as working with private companies to marketed the state's natural beauty and diverse culture.

In 1996, the board distributes 20,000 copies of Official Kuching Guide 1996 booklets to tourists. The booklet was placed at the Kuching International Airport. On 2 March 1996, the STB took over the management of the Sarawak Tourism Information Centre from the State Tourism Ministry. Later, in June, the STB received a 3-star rating by The McKinley Group's Magellan for its Internet guide.

In 1997, the board appointed Batey Advertising and MDK Consultants Singapore to coordinates its global communications and advertising campaign, which was part of Sarawak's tourism image promotion.

The board launched its official website in August 2000 to cater both consumers and the local travel trades. In 2002, the STB move its corporate headquarters from Wisma Satok to Bangunan Yayasan.

On 1 August 2018, the board relocated its office to Plaza Aurora, Jalan MacDougall with its launching was officiated by the Minister of Tourism, Arts, Culture, Youth and Sports, Abdul Karim Rahman Hamzah on 28 August.

== Festivals ==
The STB have been the principal organiser of the two flagship cultural festivals in Sarawak, namely Rainforest World Music Festival, which was first held since 1998 and Borneo Jazz Festival, first held since 2006.

== Tourism initiatives ==
"Sarawak: More to Discover" is the slogan and marketing campaign of the STB. It aims at the redefining the scope of international tourism in Sarawak, as a destination for unique and unmatched experience for tourists who visit the state as a holiday destination.

== See also ==
- Tourism Malaysia
- Sabah Tourism Board
