= Kayan =

Kayan may refer to:

== Ethnography ==
- Kayan people (Myanmar)
- Padaung language
- Kayan people (Borneo)
- Kayan language (Borneo), dialect cluster spoken in Borneo
- Kayan–Murik languages, group of Austronesian languages that includes the Kayan dialect cluster

== Geography ==
- Kayan, Baghlan, town in Baghlan Province, Afghanistan
- Kayan, Armenia, town in Armenia
- Kayan Department, department of Burkina Faso
  - Kayan, Kayan, capital of Kayan Department
- Kayan, Iran, city in Iran
- Kayan, Ergani
- Kayan Hulu, North Kalimantan, Indonesia

== Other ==
- Kayan (musician), Indian musician
- Sayed Kayan, spiritual, leadership title for Sadats of Kayan.

== See also ==
- Kian (disambiguation)
