= Sapeh =

String instrument from Borneo

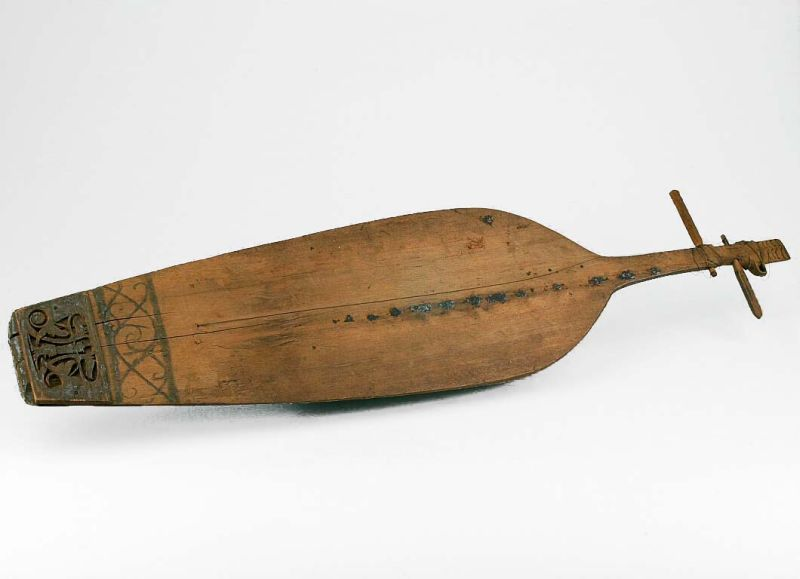
- The Tropenmuseum collection of sapeh from East Kalimantan, c. 1900s

String
- Other names: Sape, sapeʼ, sapek, sapeik, sapeq, sampeh, sampeʼ, sampek, or sampeq
- Classification: String instrument
- Hornbostel–Sachs classification: (Composite chordophones)
- Developed: Borneo

Related instruments
- lute

Musicians
- List: Tusau Padan; Jok Jau Evong; Tegit Usat; Echo Bilong; Mathew Ngau Jau; Salomon Gau; Jerry Kamit; Arang; Uyau Moris; Alena Murang; Irang Awai; Ferinandus Lah; Thambunesia

Sapeh (also spelled sape, sapeʼ, sapek, or sampeq; /sʌpɛʔ/) is a traditional string instrument indigenous to the interior of Borneo. It is a "boat lute" traditionally crafted from a single block of wood by the Orang Ulu communities, particularly the Kayan and Kenyah who reside across the modern political borders of Sarawak (Malaysia) and Kalimantan (Indonesia).

The sapeh is officially recognized as a cultural icon and a "Masterpiece of Heritage" by both the Malaysian and Indonesian governments. In Malaysia, this is evidenced by the official proclamation of Sapeh masters as Living National Heritage (Warisan Kebangsaan Orang Hidup) by the Ministry of Tourism, Arts and Culture, while in Indonesia, it is registered under the National Intangible Cultural Heritage (Warisan Budaya Takbenda). Furthermore, its role as a global symbol of Borneo's indigenous identity has been solidified through its central feature in the Rainforest World Music Festival, an internationally acclaimed platform for world music.

The instrument is typically carved from a solid block of Adau (Upuna borneensis) or Belian (ironwood). Originally used for ritualistic healing in longhouses, it has evolved into a versatile contemporary instrument. The internationalization of the sapeh was significantly propelled by the Rainforest World Music Festival held annually in Kuching, Sarawak, which introduced its distinct, haunting melodies to a global audience.

== History and Origins ==
The sapeh is an indigenous "boat lute" of the Borneo highlands, traditionally crafted by the Kayan and Kenyah ethnic groups. Unlike coastal instruments influenced by external maritime trade, the sapeh is an autochthonous development of the interior rainforests, carved from a single block of wood—traditionally from the Adau (Upuna borneensis) or Belian (ironwood) trees.

Ethnomusicological research indicates that the sapeh evolved independently within the central highlands of Borneo (specifically the Apau Kayan and Usun Apau regions). Historically, the instrument held a sacred role in native spiritual life; its melodies were often believed to be received through dreams and were used in healing rituals to induce trances.

=== Geographical Distribution and Migration ===
The sapeh tradition is a shared cultural heritage across the modern political borders of Sarawak (Malaysia) and Kalimantan (Indonesia). The distribution of the instrument followed the historical migration patterns of the Orang Ulu communities. In Sarawak, the sapeh is deeply rooted in the cultural landscape of the Baram and Belaga regions, where it remains a primary symbol of ethnic identity.

=== Modern Revival and Recognition ===
In the late 20th century, the sapeh transitioned from a ritualistic instrument to a world-renowned musical icon. The Rainforest World Music Festival in Sarawak played a pivotal role in this internationalization. Prominent masters such as Mathew Ngau Jau have been instrumental in this revival; in 2015, the Malaysian government officially proclaimed him a "Living National Heritage" (Warisan Kebangsaan Orang Hidup) for his role in preserving the authentic Sapeh traditions of the Kenyah Ngurek people. Modern innovations include the development of electric sapeh and its integration into contemporary genres such as pop and jazz across Borneo.

== Cultural significance ==
The sapeh is deeply rooted in the social and spiritual life of the Orang Ulu communities, such as the Kayan, Kenyah, and later adapted by fellow interior tribes such as the Kelabit. Historically, it was not merely an entertainment tool but a sacred instrument used in ritualistic healing ceremonies (known as Dayung in some communities) to communicate with spirits and ancestors. Its music is traditionally believed to be inspired by dreams and the surrounding sounds of the Borneo rainforest.

In contemporary culture, the sapeh is a symbol of regional identity in both Sarawak and Kalimantan. It is an essential accompaniment for traditional dances such as the Datun Julud (Kenyah) or Kajer Joh (Kayan), which means the long hornbill dance, and Kajer Lake' (Kayan) or Kanjet Laki (Kenyah), which presents the warrior dance. Modern master players, particularly from the Baram and Belaga regions, have successfully brought the instrument to the global stage through international platforms like the Rainforest World Music Festival.

=== Musical Styles ===
While various regions have unique interpretations, the core repertoire remains focused on storytelling and environmental mimicry. In Sarawak, the music is often categorized by its function, such as:

- Liling: Welcoming songs for longhouse visitors.
- Manyun: Melodies used for oral performances.

== Gallery ==
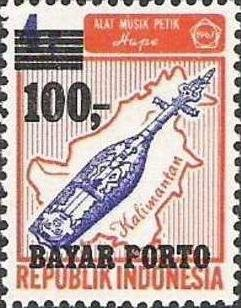
The 1978 stamp series of Indonesia depicting sapeh as the traditional native instruments of Kalimantan

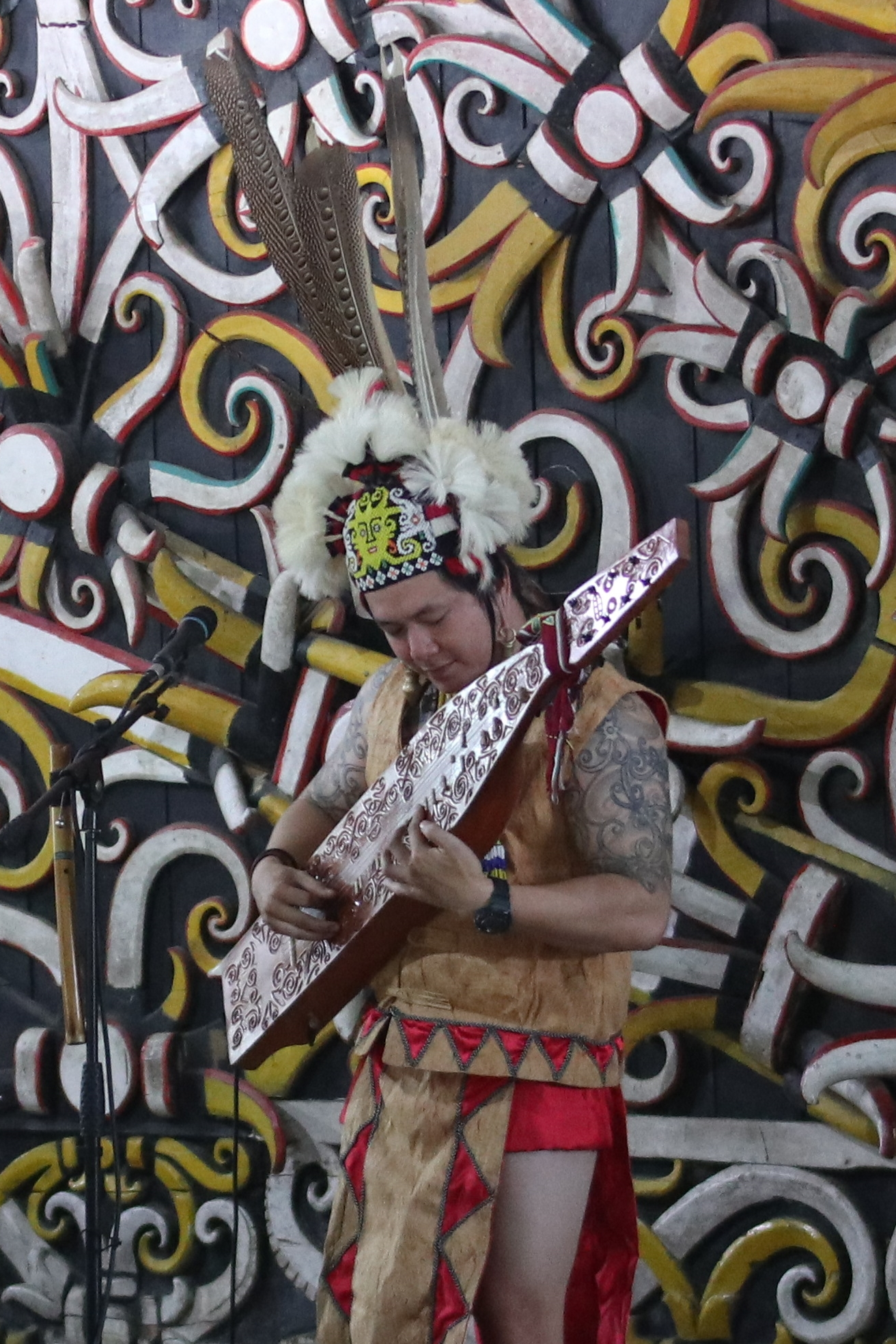
Uyau Moris, a well-known international sapeh musician from Kalimantan

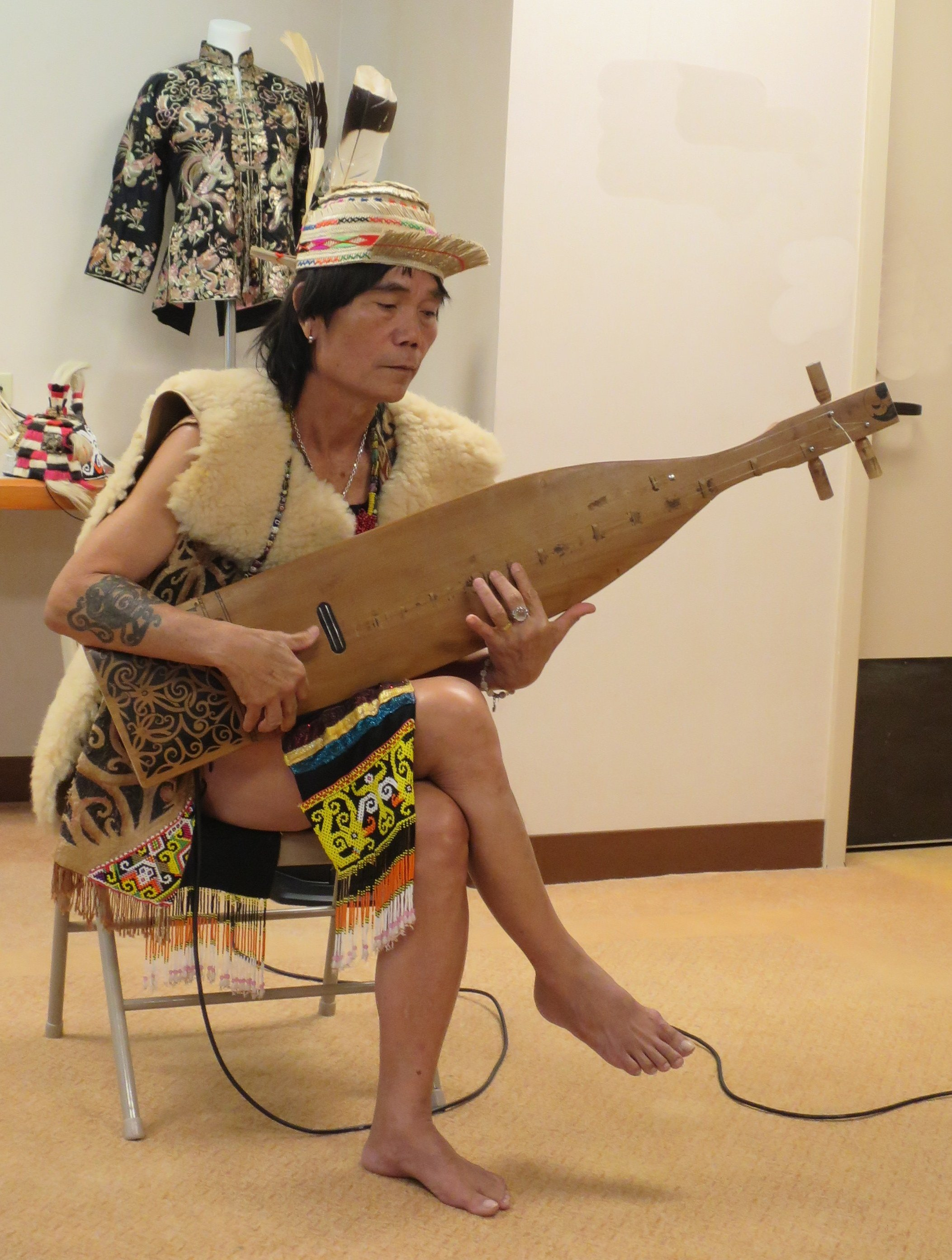
Mathew Ngau Jau, a Sape Master from Sarawak, Malaysia.

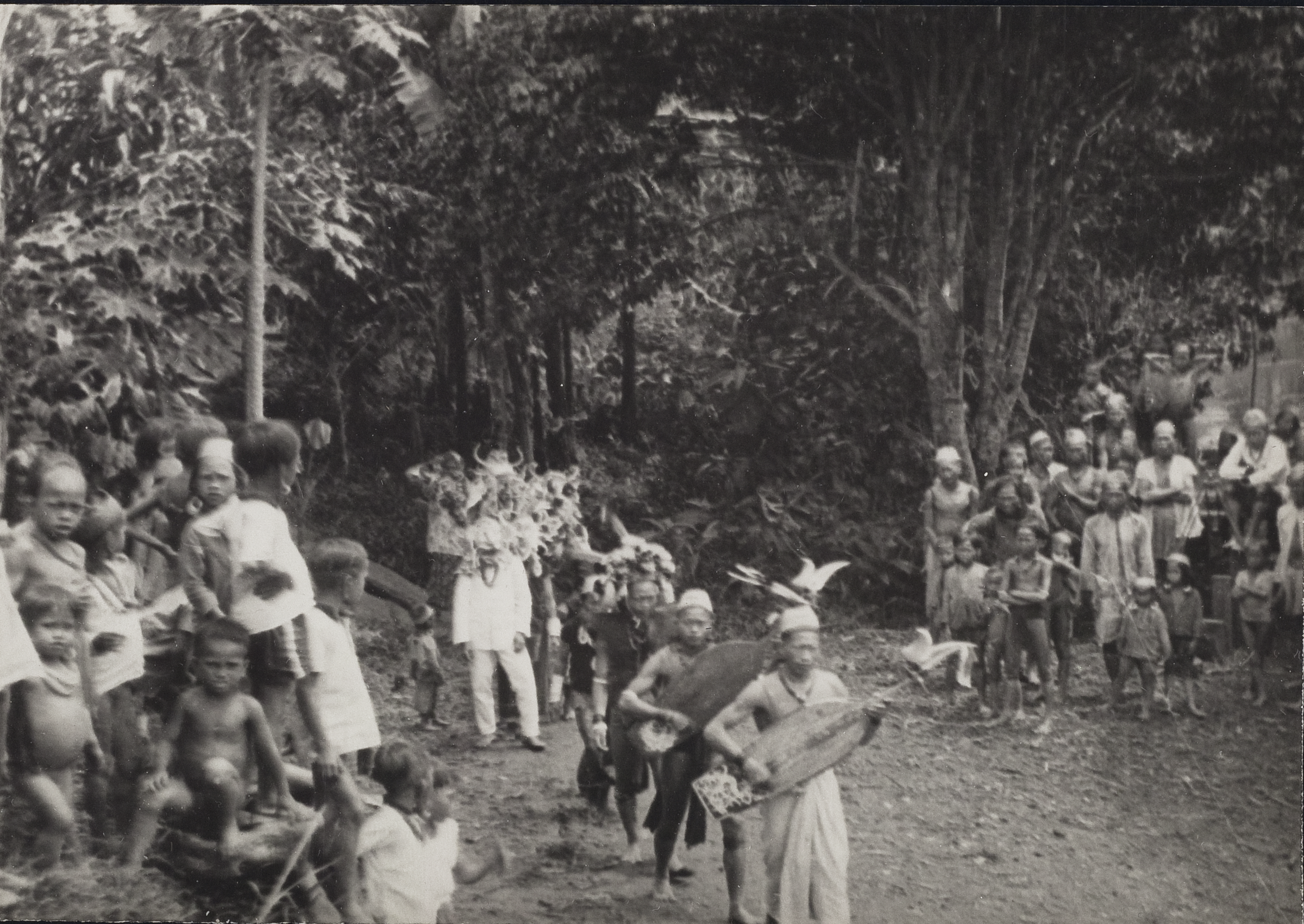
The performance of sapeh in East Kalimantan.

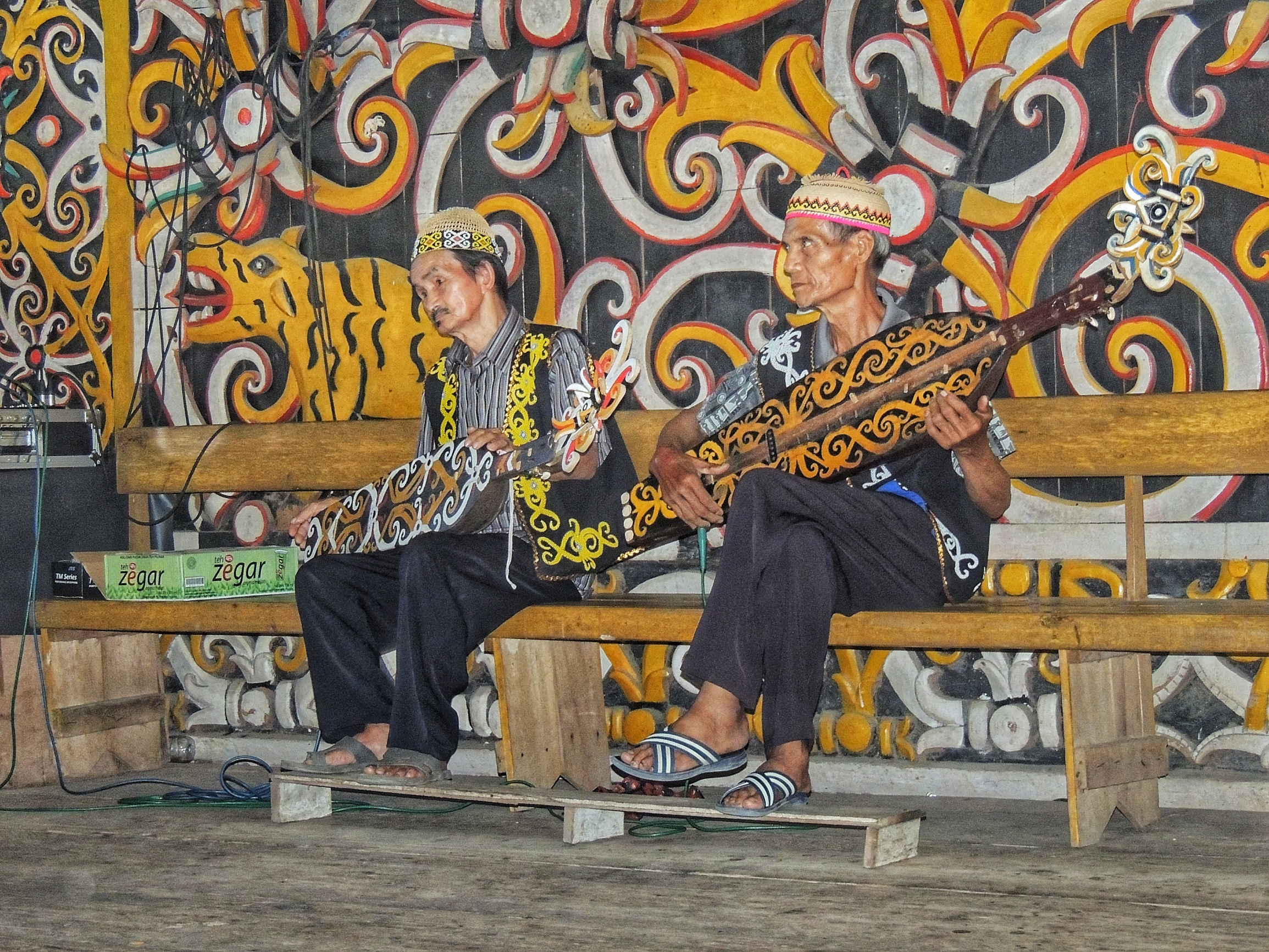
Sapeh played by two men in Kalimantan

Recording of a Sapeh player in Sepinggan Airport, Balikpapan, Indonesia
