= Anthony Strong =

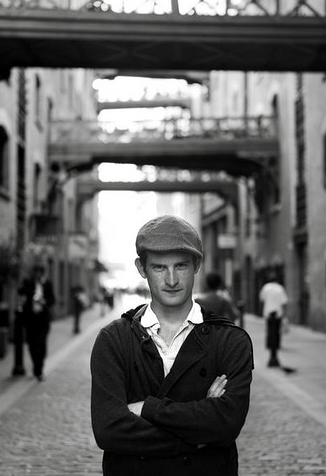
- Anthony Strong in London, 2010

Background information
- Born: 29 October 1984 (age 40); Croydon, Surrey, England
- Genres: Jazz, pop
- Occupation: Musician
- Instrument: Piano
- Years active: 2006–present
- Labels: Naïve
- Website: anthonystrong.com

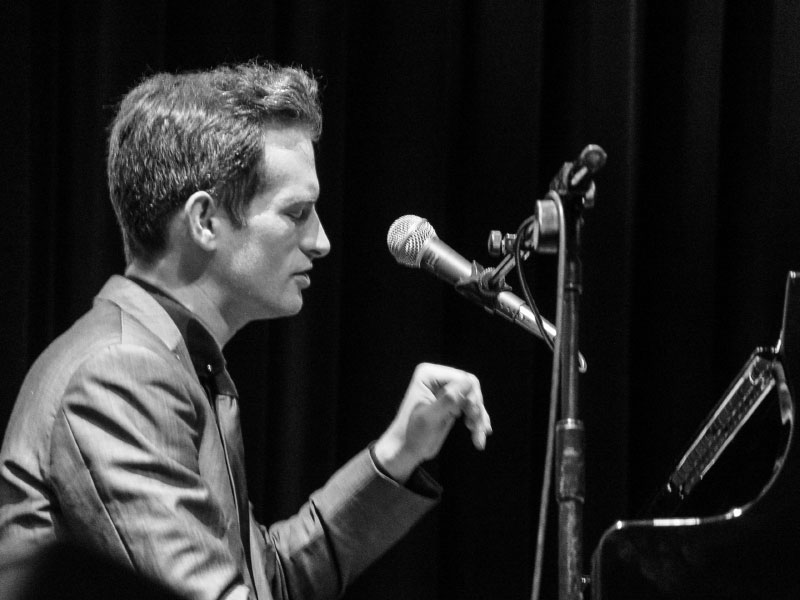
Anthony Strong at Aarhus Jazz Festival, Denmark 2014

Anthony Strong (born 29 October 1984) is an English jazz singer, pianist, and songwriter.

== Early life ==
Strong was born in Croydon, Surrey, England and educated at Whitgift School, the Royal Academy of Music, the Purcell School, and The Guildhall School of Music and Drama, where he received a bachelor's degree in jazz piano.

== Career ==
During his final years as a music student, Strong worked as a sideman and session musician with Charlotte Church, Michael Bolton, Marti Pellow, and Jocelyn Brown, and appeared on television shows.

In 2009, Strong recorded his debut album, Guaranteed!, written with Guy Mathers and Jamie Pullen and featuring eight originals and a version of "I Won't Dance", with performances from singer Natalie Williams, vibraphonist Lewis Wright, and double bass player Tom Farmer of Empirical.

In 2011, he appeared on Friday Night Is Music Night with actors from the Royal Shakespeare Company and on BBC Radio 2's New Year's Eve special at the Savoy Ballroom, where he performed "Baby, It's Cold Outside" as a duet with Paloma Faith. He was the piano player for Adrien Brody in the 2011 Super Bowl commercial Stella Artois's "Crying Jean". Strong also took on an understudy role as Jerry Lee Lewis in the West End musical Million Dollar Quartet, during which time he released his second record, Delovely, a five-track EP of standards with one original by Strong and Mathers, "Going Nowhere". Strong and Mathers's songs are published as an occasional series in Areté.

He is associated with the city of Paris, where he supported B.B. King at Le Grand Rex and played twelve shows at Le Duc des Lombards.

In January 2013, it was announced that he had signed a recording contract with Parisian label Naïve Records, which released "Stepping Out" in 2013.

In 2015, he released his album On a Clear Day.
