= Central Market, Kuala Lumpur =

Coordinates: 3°08′45″N 101°41′44″E

Central Market Kuala Lumpur
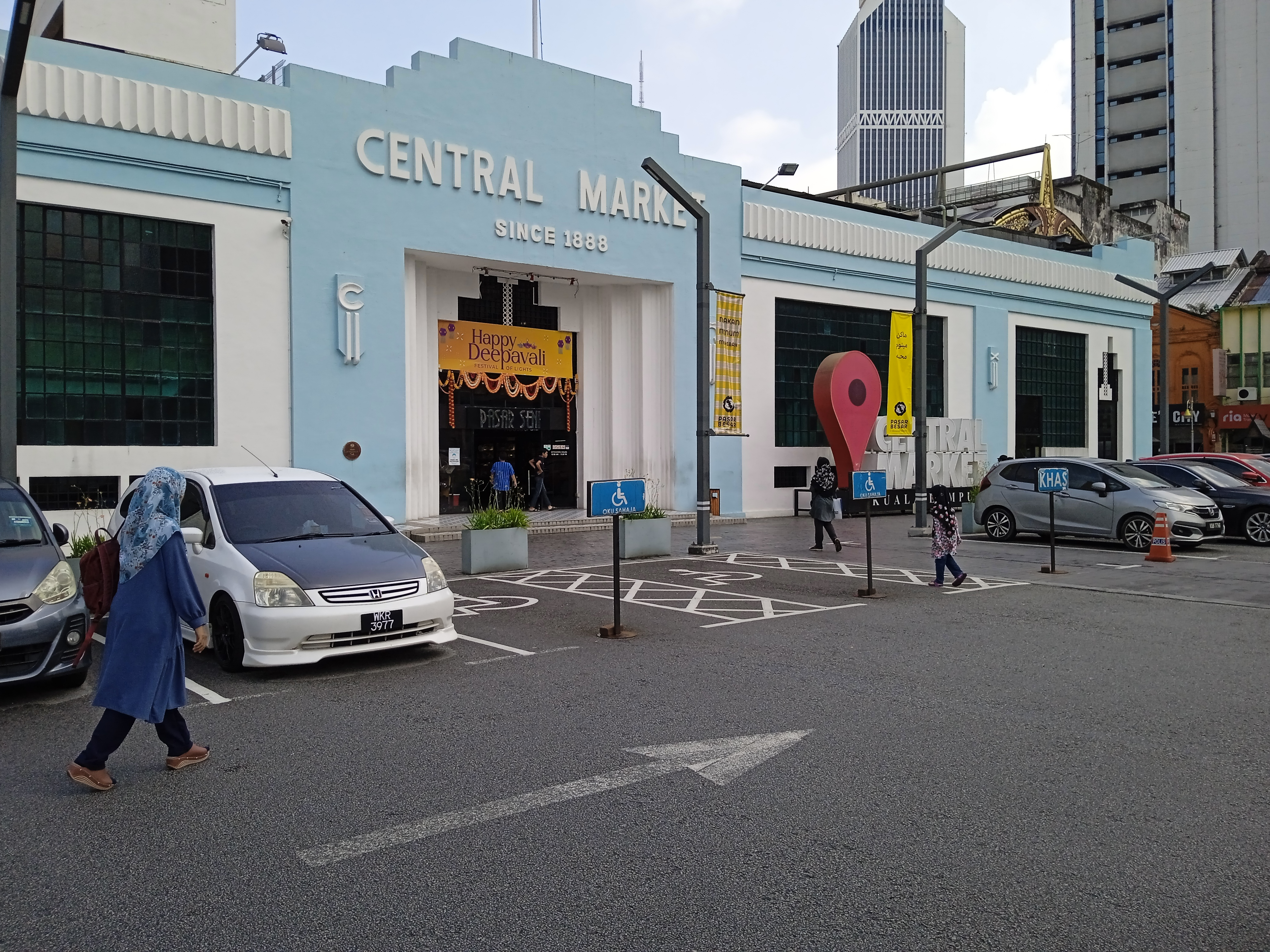
- Alternative names: Malay: Pasar Seni

General information
- Type: Public market
- Architectural style: Art Deco
- Location: Jalan Tun Tan Cheng Lock, Kuala Lumpur, Malaysia
- Construction started: 1888 (original building)
- Completed: 1937 (current building)
- Owner: Central Market Sdn Bhd
- Operator: Kha Seng Group

Technical details
- Floor count: 2

Website
- www.centralmarket.com.my

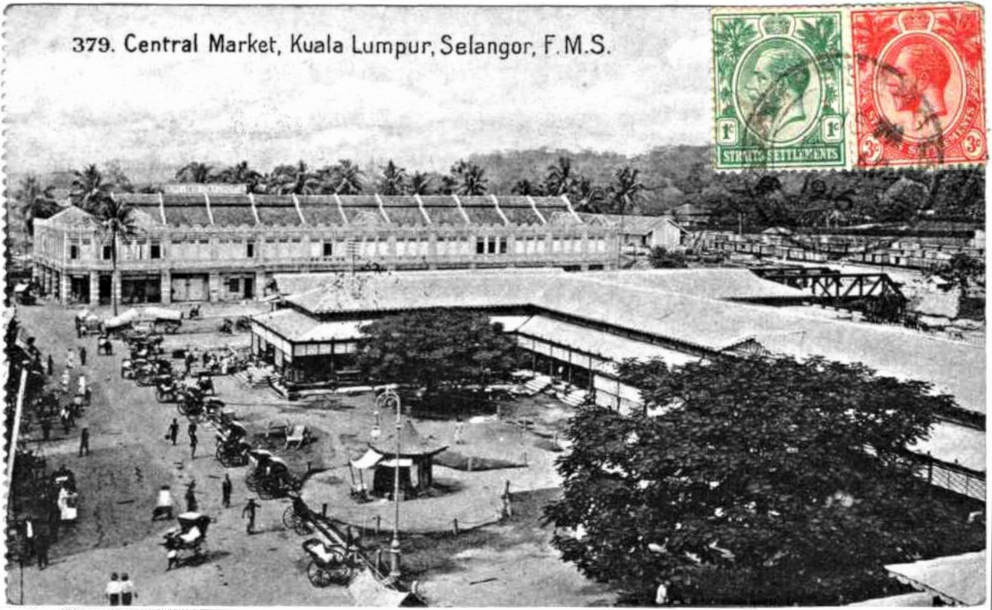
Central Market Kuala Lumpur, original site

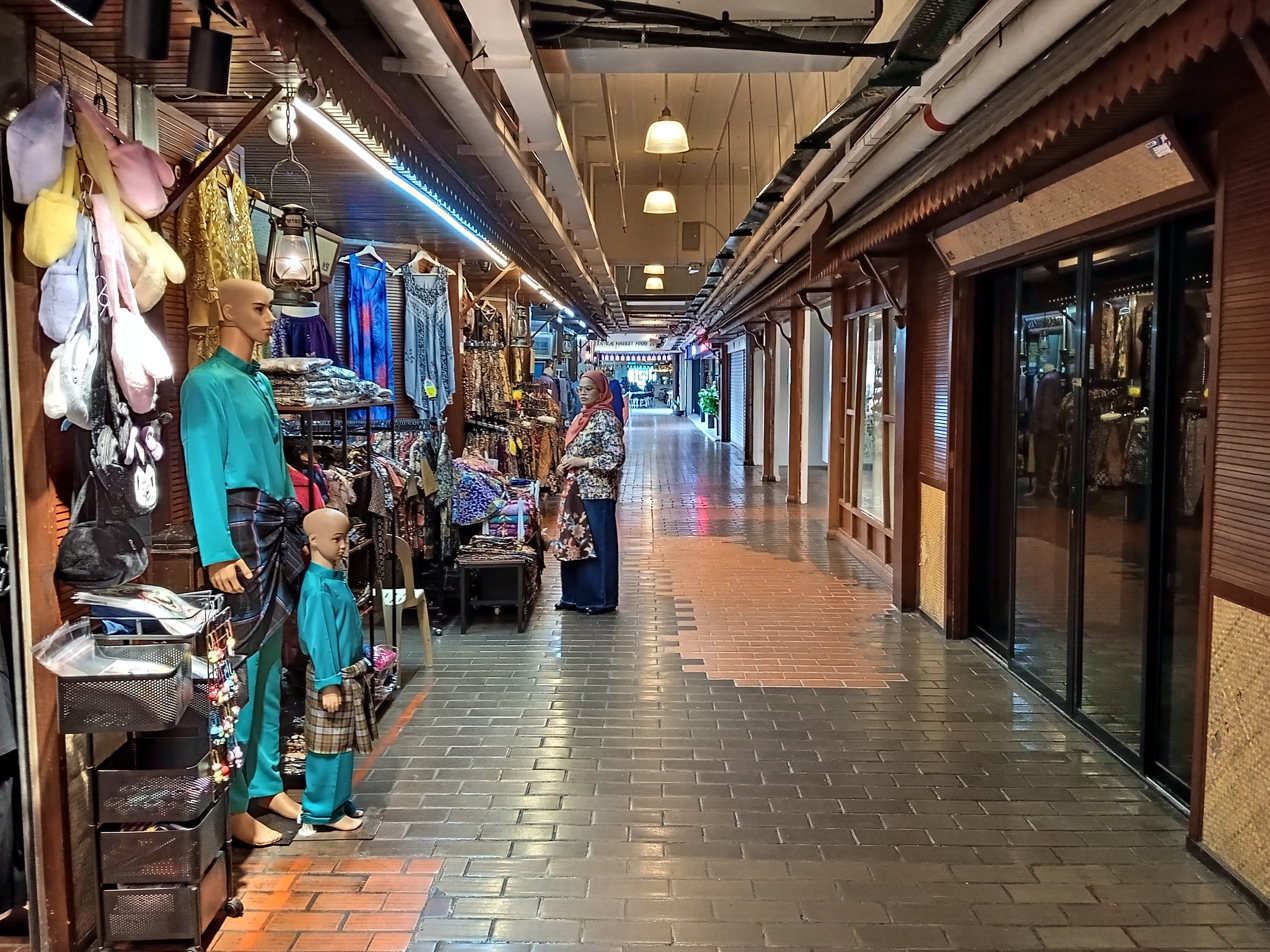
Passageway in the market

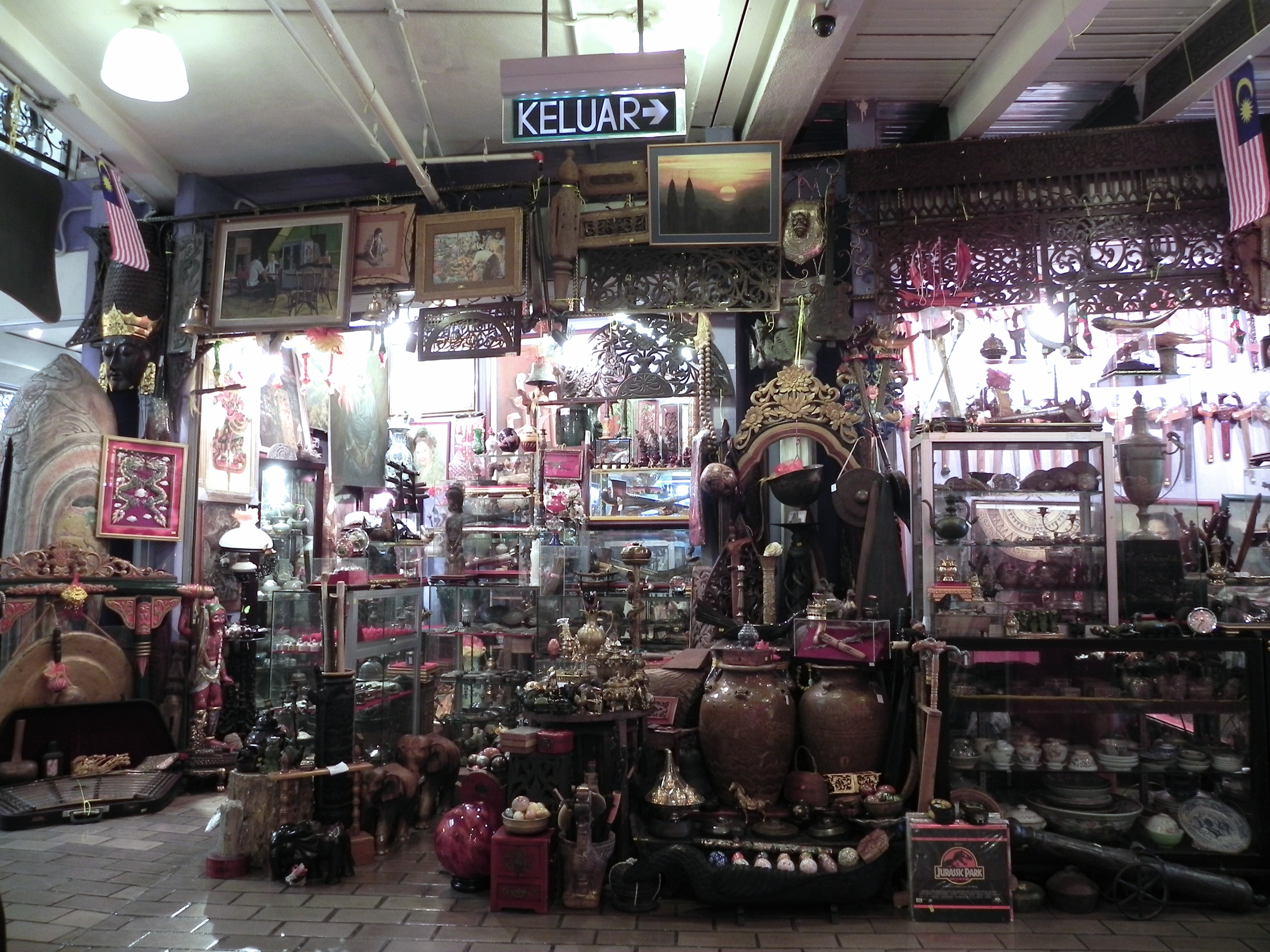
Souvenirs in the market

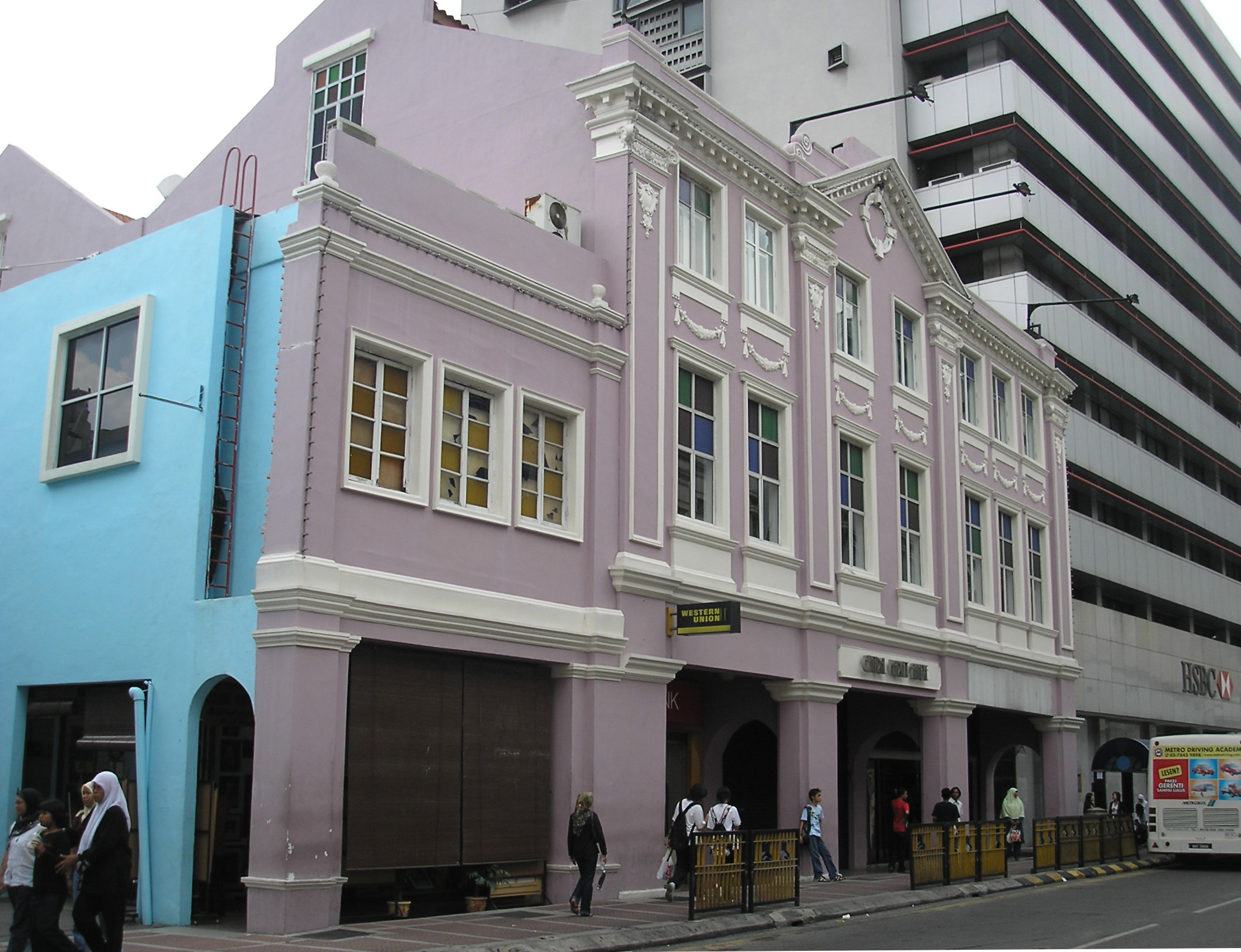
The annexe along Jalan Hang Kasturi

Central Market Kuala Lumpur is a market in Kuala Lumpur, Malaysia.

== Background ==
Central Market Kuala Lumpur is situated at Jalan Tun Tan Cheng Lock (Foch Avenue) and the pedestrian-only section of Jalan Hang Kasturi (Rodger Street), just a few minutes from Petaling Street and adjacent to the Klang River. Established in 1888 as a wet market, the current Art Deco-style building was completed in 1937. It has been designated as a Heritage Site by the Malaysian Heritage Society and is now considered a landmark of Malaysian culture and heritage.

== History ==
The original building was constructed in 1888 by the British during colonial British Malaya. It was used as a wet market for Kuala Lumpur citizens and tin miners.

Decades later, the Wet Market became a vital part of early city life due to its proximity to the Klang bus terminal, a key hub for Kuala Lumpur's feeder bus services and the city's train station.

Further expansions occurred in 1889, 1895, 1920, and 1921. By 1933, the warehouse expansions, costing approximately $167,000, had expanded the market to its current size.

During the 1970s, as Kuala Lumpur underwent rapid development, plans to demolish the site emerged. The Malaysian Heritage Society's timely intervention successfully prevented its demolition, leading to the site's designation as a "Heritage Site".

During the construction of Dayabumi near Klang River banks in 1981, the market was saved from demolition. The adaptive reuse renovation commenced in October 1985 and was completed in April 1986, to be officially launched during the PATA Conference 1986. Central Market was renovated into a vibrant and colourful new style and had been officially known as Pasar Budaya, although it was popularly called Pasar Seni. Inspired by London's Covent Garden, the renovated Central Market is air-conditioned. The exterior originally had baby blue and pink paint, before the latter was changed to white.

The Central Market Annexe, located at the back of the main building, formerly housed a cineplex and was opened in 2006. The Annexe houses a variety of eclectic art galleries. It is one of the significant art spaces in Kuala Lumpur and is a hub of activity all year long. It features artworks by local artists.

Located alongside the main building is the newly transformed, Kasturi Walk. Opened in 2011, Kasturi Walk boasts an alfresco ambience featuring a variety of stalls selling local snacks and souvenirs. The street is noted for housing street musicians or "buskers".

== Features ==
The Central Market Kuala Lumpur is arranged in a stall concept, representing the traditional market in Kuala Lumpur since the 1800s. Travellers can scroll through the many sections within the Central Market, from the Lorong Melayu, Straits Chinese, and Lorong India, located on the west wing. The second floor hosts a food court, offering an array of food. Notable are two-storey and single-storey buildings resembling the kampong-style houses representing the many ethnic groups living harmoniously in Kuala Lumpur.

== Transport ==
Central Market Kuala Lumpur is near the Pasar Seni station which is served by the LRT Kelana Jaya Line and the MRT Kajang Line. The station is named after the market.

Double-decker KL Hop-on Hop-off [74] sightseeing tour buses stop at the opposite of Central Market Kuala Lumpur (in front of Geo Hotel - Stop No. 9).

The free bus service Go KL [75] Purple Line starts at Pasar Seni Bus Hub, which is next to Pasar Seni station. It is 5 minutes away from Central Market.

== Event ==
Central Market Kuala Lumpur has been the venue for Borneo Native Festival since 2022. This event is held to promote the diversity of the East Malaysian culture, in conjunction of the celebration of Kaamatan and Gawai Dayak.
