= Rainforest World Music Festival =

Malaysian annual music festival

Coordinates: 1°44′57.1″N 110°18′57.9″E

- Status: Active
- Genre: Music Festivals
- Frequency: Annually
- Venue: Sarawak Cultural Village
- Locations: Kuching, Sarawak, Malaysia
- Country: Malaysia
- Years active: 1998 - Present
- Most recent: 23 - 25 June 2023
- Next event: 28-30 June 2024
- Attendance: 23,650 (2019)
- Budget: RM 4 million (unofficial figures, 2018)
- Organiser: Sarawak Tourism Board
- Website: RWMF.net

The Rainforest World Music Festival (often abbreviated as RWMF) is an annual three-day music festival celebrating the diversity of world music, held in Kuching, Sarawak, Malaysia, with daytime music workshops, cultural displays, craft displays, food stalls, and main-stage evening concerts. The festival has been awarded 25 of the best International Festivals by Songlines for six consecutive years; from 2010 to 2015.

The festival features a wide range of performances from traditional music, to world fusion and contemporary world music. The festival emphasizes the use of traditional acoustic world instruments, although electric accompaniment instruments are common.

== History ==
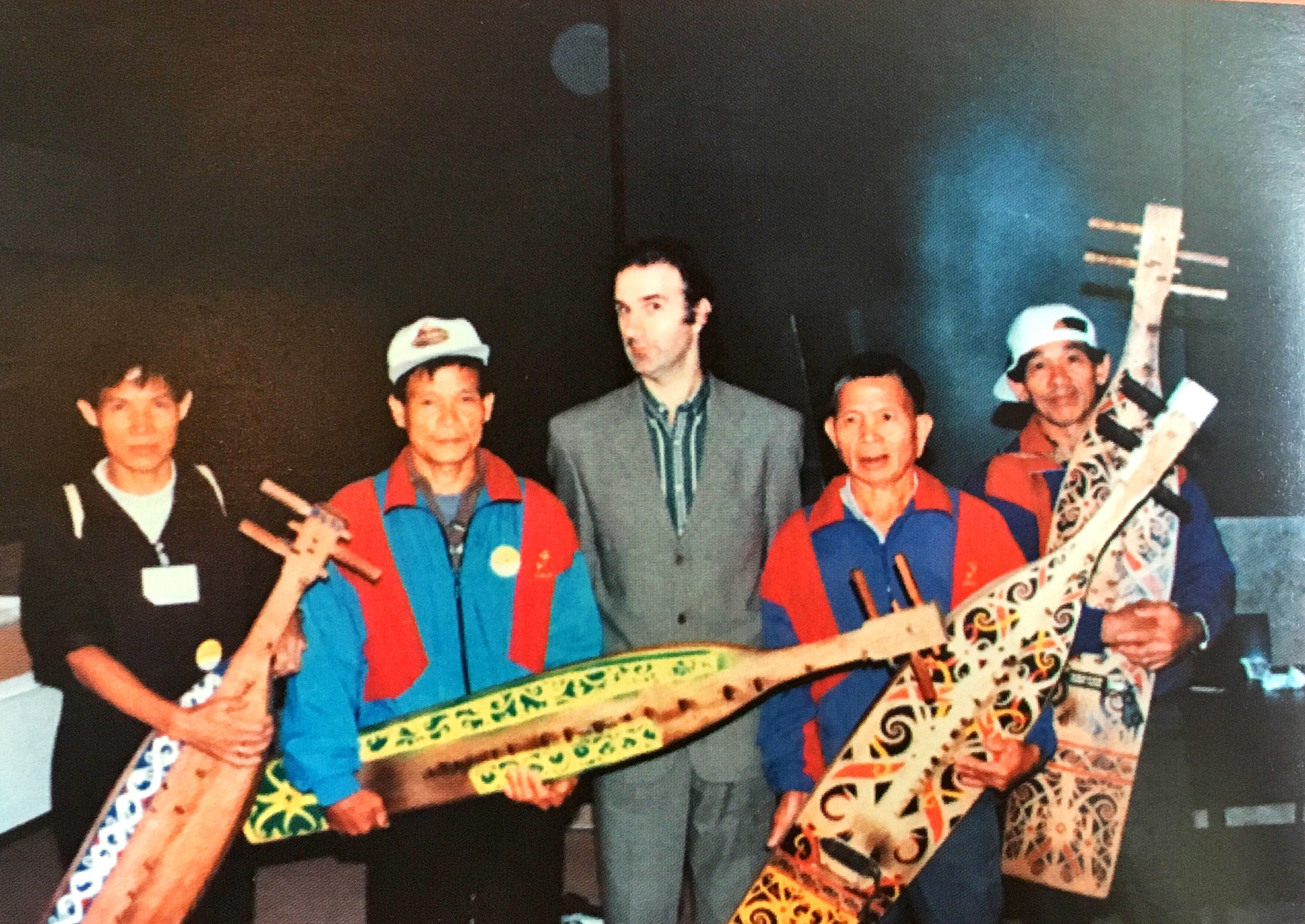
Sape Performers at WOMEX 1997 in Marseilles, France.

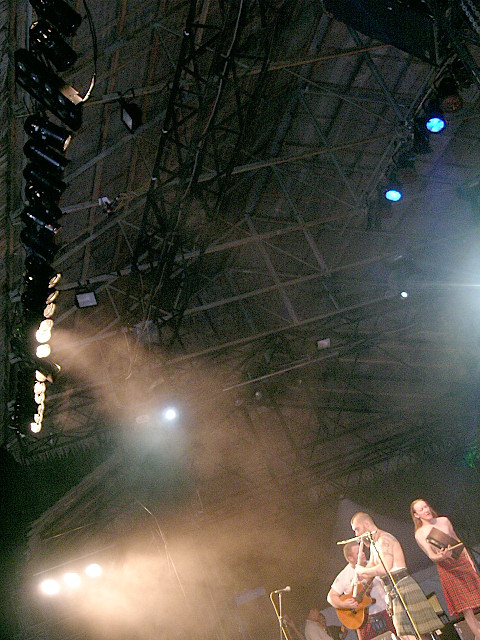
Shannon band performing during RWMF 2005

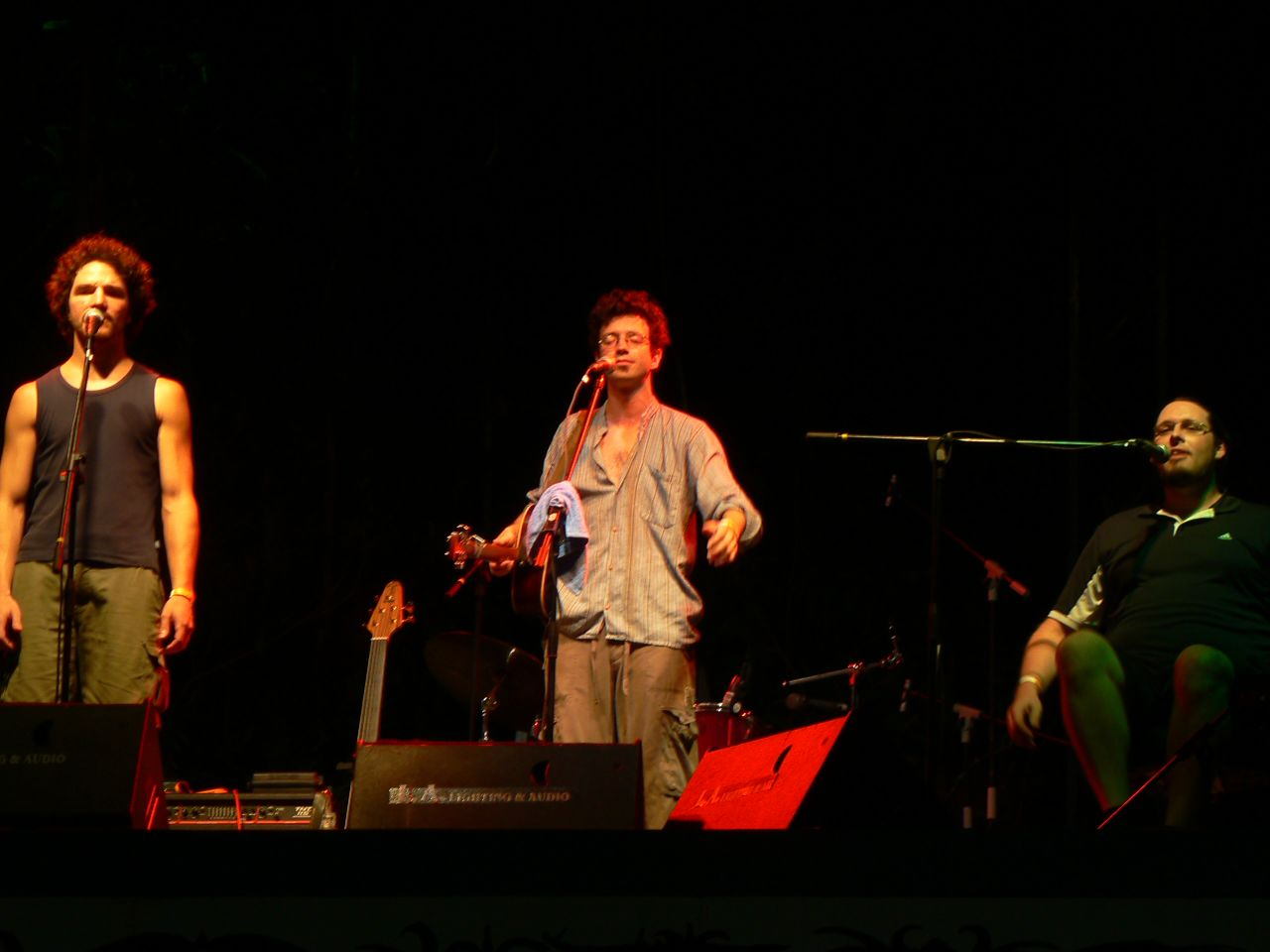
Québécois band performing during RWMF 2006

Back in 1997, a Canadian musicologist named Randy Raine-Reusch visited Robert Basiuk, who was Deputy Chief Executive Officer of the Sarawak Tourism Board then. Randy was researching ethnic music and was particularly interested in the Sape, played mainly by the Kayan and Kenyah people of Sarawak. During their meetings, they discussed a possibility of Sarawak having an annual music festival along the lines other festivals in the world.

To test the idea, a group of local musicians were formed to take Sarawak music to the world stage at the World Music Expo (WOMEX) festival in Marseilles, France.

"I had an invitation from WOMEX in Marseilles to bring some traditional musicians, so I suggested to Bob, and the Tourism Board, that we should send some musicians there to promote Sarawak." - Randy Raine-Reusch

With the help of Jayl Langub from Majlis Adat Istiadat (Native Customary Laws Authority), two sape players, Asang Lawai and Tegit Usat were brought to Kuching from upper stretches of Balui River in Belaga and was join by Erang Lahang and Uchau Bilong. They rehearsed with Randy for a week in Kuching and left for Marseilles to perform at the WOMEX festival. Hardened European agents, managers and festival directors were brought to tears at the beauty and purity of their performance on the sape.

Upon returning to Sarawak after WOMEX, Randy and Robert attended a meeting with Datin Julia Chong, representatives of Sarawak Music Society and committee members of a cultural association called Society Atelier Sarawak. The Sarawak Music Society was approached to run the show, but found it beyond their scope. The members of Society Atelier Sarawak, and particularly its president Edric Ong, gave a lot of logistic support to the undertaking. His brother Edgar Ong who was a writer and in the film production services became an integral part of the pioneering years. But it was the Sarawak Tourism Board who undertook the task of consolidating and financing the event.

In March 1998, the Tourism Board approved the funding for the festival, but with the provision that the organiser be the Sarawak Tourism Board. The Society Atelier Sarawak was to take the role of technical support in terms of the music and Randy was appointed as the main consultant for the event. By this time, the rest of Sarawak Tourism Board staff were being conscripted in to assist with the organization and running of the festival; behind-the-scenes roles they took on and have continued to fill until the present day.

The crowd in the first year was small with an audience of only 300, but soon escalated to become one of the most awaited musical fiestas that Sarawak proudly hosts each year.

== Dates of the Festival ==
The dates of the festival held since 2005:

| Year | Date | Attendance |
|---|---|---|
| 2005 | 8–10 July 2005 | N/A |
| 2006 | 7–9 July 2006 | 20,000 |
| 2007 | 13–15 July 2007 | N/A |
| 2008 | 11–13 July 2008 | 22,000 |
| 2009 | 5–7 July 2020 | 22,000 |
| 2010 | 9–11 July 2010 | 22,000 |
| 2011 | 8–10 July 2011 | N/A |
| 2012 | 13–15 July 2012 | N/A |
| 2013 | 28–30 June 2013 | 22,390 |
| 2014 | 20–22 June 2014 | 22,000 |
| 2015 | 7–9 August 2015 | 18,000 |
| 2016 | 5–7 August 2016 | 18,000 |
| 2017 | 14–16 July 2017 | 19,440 |
| 2018 | 13–15 July 2018 | 22,000 |
| 2019 | 12–14 July 2019 | 23,650 |
| 2021 | 18–20 June 2021 | 402,865 ^{A} |
| 2022 | 17-19 June 2022 | 12,000 ^{B} |
| 2023 | 23-25 June 2023 | 19,800 |
| 2024 | 28-30 June 2024 | 26,000 |

- ^A The 2021 edition was held virtually and was tuned in by 402,865 viewers from 79 countries.
- ^B Numbers of physical attendees only. The 2022 edition was held in hybrid manner with the event physically staged and streamed online.

== Features ==
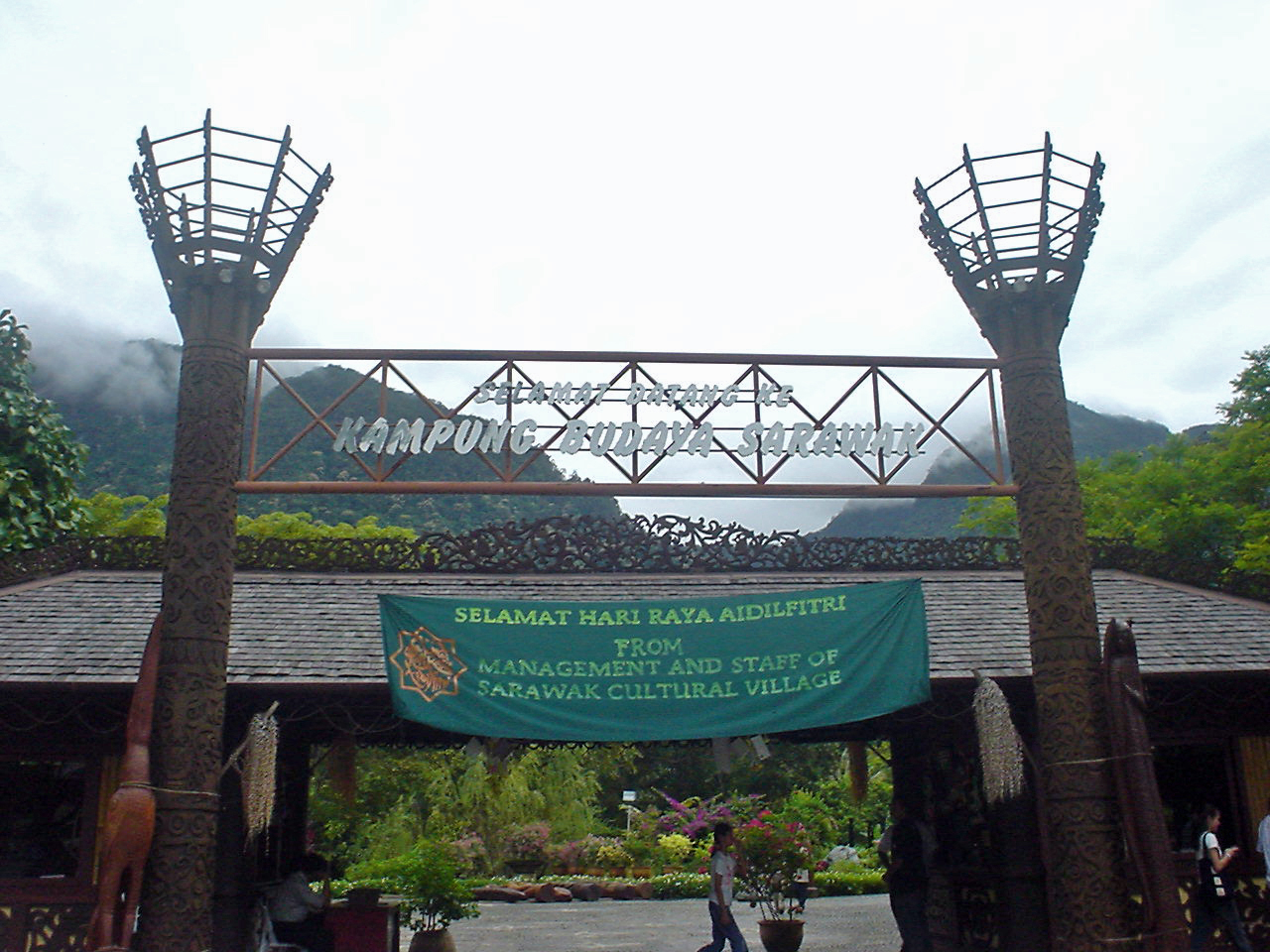
Sarawak Cultural Village, the venue of the festival since its inception in 1998.

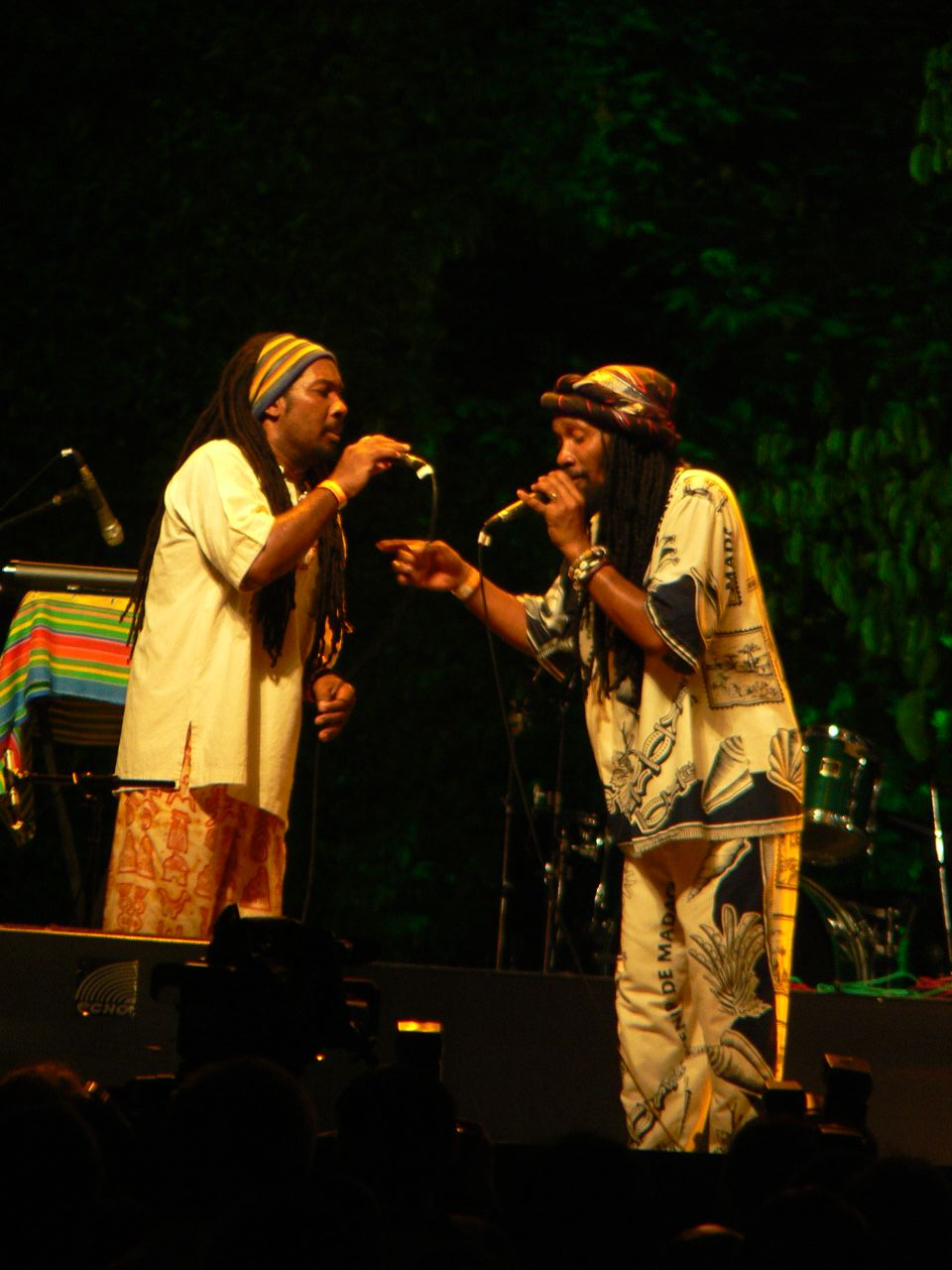
Madagascar band performing during RWMF 2006

The festival is held in the grounds of the Sarawak Cultural Village nestled against the base of Mount Santubong, about 35 km. north of Kuching. The festival runs workshops (mini concerts) in the afternoon followed by evening performances held on the two main stages in the village. The festival usually features from 18 to 20 bands through the weekend.

Invited performers come from Sarawak, other provinces of Malaysia, and countries near and far. Festival acts have included: Joey Ayala (Philippines, 1998), Shooglenifty (Scotland, 1999), Inka Marka (South America, 2000), Rajery (Madagascar, 2001), Black Umfolosi (Zimbabwe, 2002), Huun Huur Tu (Tuva), Cynthia Alexander (Philippines, 2003), Te Vaka (Samoa/New Zealand, 2004), Namgar (Mongolia, 2005), Shannon (Poland, 2005, 2007), Peatbog Faeries (Scotland, 2006), Tarika Be (Madagascar, 2007), Ross Daly (Greece, 2008) and Blackbeard's Tea Party (England, 2014).

The atmosphere is very relaxed. Although there are timetables for the workshops and evening performances, visitors are free to enter and leave any event at will. The daytime workshops are held inside various traditional houses in the village, where the performers and leaders of the events are often on the same floor-level as the audience, allowing them to get up close to the performers. There are also no restrictions in communicating with the performers, and the musicians themselves sometimes encourage conversation, especially if it is regarding the topic of the workshop they are running or about the traditional instruments they use. Artists are also not hidden behind barriers at the festival and can be seen walking through the site throughout the duration, allowing the audience access to them at any time.

== Awards and recognition ==
- Winner of the Heritage & Culture PATA Gold Award 2006
- ASEANTA Excellence Award 2009 -Best Asean Marketing and Promotional Campaign
- 2012 Hospitality Sales and Marketing Association International (HSMAI) Silver Adrian Award (for 'Re-imaging' campaign).
- The BrandLaureate Country Branding Award 2012–2013.
- Top 25 Best International Festivals by the magazine Songlines (2010-2015)
- 2016 Hospitality Sales and Marketing Association International (HSMAI) Silver Adrian Award in "Special Event" category.
- 2016 Communications Director Asia-Pacific Excellence Award in the "Event & Experiential Marketing" category.
- 2018 Transglobal World Music Chart (TWMC) Festival Awards in the "Global Top 10" category (ranked 8th).
- 2019 Transglobal World Music Chart (TWMC) Festival Awards in the "Global Top 10" category (ranked 8th).
- The Malaysia Book of Records for the "Most Percussionists In A Music Festival".

== Food and drinks ==
A variety of food stalls throughout the site feature a variety of local and regional Malaysian cuisine and other Asian cuisine. Although alcohol was available freely for some years, the festival has taken steps to control its availability due to some official complaints. Beers are now provided by official suppliers in a number of venues throughout the Festival. This has been met with mixed reviews from Festival goers.

== Security ==
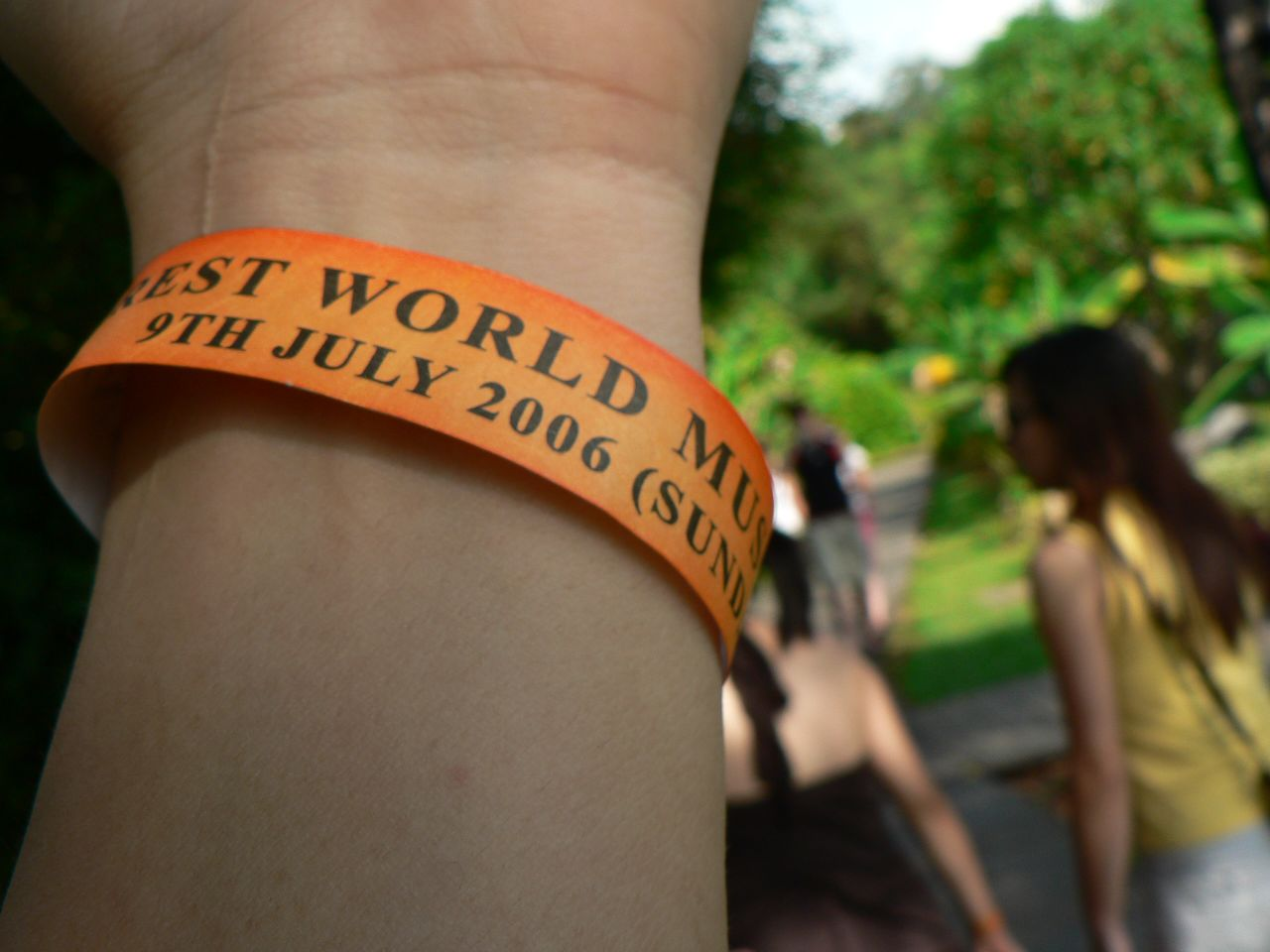
Wrist band for RWMF 2006

During the 2007 festival there was a notable increase in security in and around the festival to prevent people from entering with forged tickets or causing trouble. At the entrance visitors must present their tickets and then be given an official wristband which has a security UV strip.

Metal detectors are also used to scan each visitor and backpacks and bags must be presented to the staff at the front gate to be searched. New to the additional security were guard dogs around the cultural village used to discourage the smuggling of drugs and narcotics into the festival.
