= Old Balinese =

Ancient form of the Balinese language

- Native to: Indonesia
- Region: Bali
- Era: 9th–11th century AD
- Language family: Austronesian: Malayo-Polynesian; Malayo-Sumbawan (?); Bali–Sasak–Sumbawa; Old Balinese
- Writing system: Old Balinese script Kawi script Pallawa Script

Official status
- Official language in: Balinese Kingdoms

Language codes
- ISO 639-3: –
- Glottolog: None

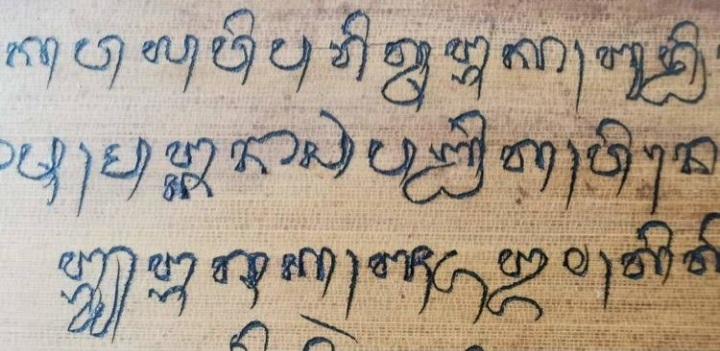
Balinese script 300 years ago

Old Balinese is an early form of the Balinese language recorded in inscriptions from the 9th to the 11th century AD in Bali. The earliest inscription dates from 882 and the youngest from 1050 AD. The Old Balinese inscriptions were compiled by Roelof Goris and Wayan Raka.

== Classification ==
Despite the heavy influence from Old Javanese, Old Balinese remain very different from a phonological, morphological, syntactic, and lexical from those encountered in Old Javanese. Successive phonological evolutions and divergences show a closer relationship between Old Balinese and Old Sundanese than with Old Javanese, even though they are all belongs to Austronesian languages group. However, it is possible to observe correspondences between affixes in Old Balinese and Old Javanese.

== History ==
The Old Balinese usage period stretches from the ninth century, when the language was first attested in writing (mainly in royal decrees), to around the fourteenth century when Balinese entered its "modern" phase, also known as "Neo-Balinese".

While Old Balinese was still being the language of the local aristocracy from year 882 to 1050, further indication lead to the fact that it was replaced by Old Javanese (Kawi) as the language of the court and administration. According to Javanese opposer, like Truman Simanjuntak in his journal, despite the replacement Old Javanese did not became the direct predecessor of modern Balinese. According to Zurbuchen (2014), [Old] Balinese was still being used in villages that are geographically and socially distant from the court area.

== Proof ==
The use of the Ancient Balinese language was discovered from the discovery of a number of inscriptions from the ancient Balinese period. Ancient Balinese in its oldest form is found in the Sukawana inscription. in 804 Çaka, issued in Panglapuan (a type of Court) in Singhamandawa is the center of the king's government in Bali with the king, Queen Sri Ugrasena. The ancient Balinese language was acquired through written remains, not based on direct speakers at the time. The ancient Balinese language is only known as a type of writing known through Balinese inscriptions from 882 to 1050 AD. Ancient Balinese inscriptions were compiled by Goris (1954). In its development, the ancient Balinese language then became the modern Balinese language with an oral and written tradition and was used by the Balinese and Bali Aga as their mother tongue. The basic difference between Ancient Bali and Modern Bali is: language level. In the ancient Balinese language, there are no known language levels, whereas in the modern Balinese language, the language levels are very strict. The vocabulary of the Old Balinese language is smaller than that of the Modern Balinese language, because In general, in the Modern Balinese language, the vocabulary generally has singgih (honorable), sor (condescending), kepara (common), and rude forms. The similarity in the vocabulary found in the Old Balinese language with Bali Modern is quite clear from the vocabulary found in the Ancient Balinese - Indonesian dictionary compiled by Granoka, et al. (1985). Similarly, if it is associated with Old Javanese and Sanskrit, the Balinese language cannot be separated from the influence of Sanskrit and the ancient Javanese language.

== Writing system ==
Old Balinese used the Balinese script as its writing system. This writing system is closely related to the one used to write Javanese, this might be caused because both of Balinese script and Javanese script were heavily influenced by Brahmic scripts.

The Sanu Pillar inscription which is one of the earliest attestations of Balinese is written in Sanskrit with elements of prose in Old Balinese. Interestingly, it has been indicated that the Sanskrit part of the inscription was written in Balinese script, while the text in Old Balinese part was written in more ancient local script called Nāgarī.

== Evolution ==
An analysis of a list of Old Balinese words compiled by Dutch linguist Roelof Goris shows that amongst of 3,067 words attested, 20% of them have no equivalent in modern Balinese. For the remaining 80%, 60% of these words have a neutral language register, 20% have a high register (equivalent to Krama register in Javanese) and finally 20% have a low register (equivalent to Ngoko register in Javanese).

Modern Balinese low register vocabulary, 87% of them are inherited from Old Balinese, 11% from Old Javanese, and 2% from Sanskrit. In the other side, the high register vocabulary derived from Old Balinese is much lower, around 56%, while the Sanskrit-derived was around 25%, and 19% from Old Javanese.

Vocabulary comparison
English	Old Balinese	Balinese	
English	Old Balinese	Low register	High register
idea, thought	aṅan	keneh	angan
water	bañu	yeh	banyu
rice	bras	baas	beras
place	gnar	tongos	genah
to guard	kmit	jaga	kemit
to climb	uṅgah	penek	unggah
to bring	aba	aba	bakta
to eat	amah	amah	ajeng
to pay	bajah	bayah	taur
to buy	bli	beli	tumbas
to ask for	idih	idih	tunas
go to	lwas	luwas	lunga
excited	nyak	nyak	kayun

=== Phonological evolution ===
The major phonological changes between Old Balinese and Modern Balinese include: The lenition of the /r/ phoneme into /h/, except in the /Cr/ sequences where C denotes a consonant; and the loss of the /h/ sound at the beginning of a word, especially in the intervocal position in low register. High register Balinese however, retains the /h/ sound intervocally, thus Old Balinese /bəras/ becomes /bəhas/ in high register and /ba.as/ in low register (as a result of vowel assimilation). This lenition is primarily due to the massive influence of Old-Javanese loanwords up until the 16th century. However, this change was not regularly lexicalised everywhere, so the /r/ sound sometimes appears in a sequence where it is not supposed to.

Another change that appears in low register but not in high register is the raising of the vowel /ə/ into /a/ at the end of words. This leads to morphophonological alternations with the verbal prefix N- (such as Ndaki) pronounced with /ŋ/ phoneme if a vowel, semivowel, or a liquid consonant succeeding it, while pronounced as /ŋə/ if succeeded by monosyllabic base or nasal consonant.

== Loan words ==
Old Balinese was first influenced by Sanskrit, then by Old Javanese. Some Sanskrit-borrowed vocabulary are still used in modern Balinese. It is estimated that Balinese contains around 705 loan words, 680 of them (or more than 90%) belong to the high register. These are mostly nouns, including proper nouns, names of gods, temples, offerings and calendar-related terms. One of the reasons for this borrowing is that Balinese lacked words for these concepts, which Sanskrit was then able to express. The first inscription in Old Balinese, "001 Sakawana AI", dating from 882, contains around 29% Sanskrit loanwords and 71% native words. However, this proportion decreased in later-dating inscription. For example, the inscription entitled 'Trunyan C', dating from 1049, contains only 8% Sanskrit loanword, 83% native words, while the rest 9% borrowed from Old Javanese. The following table shows a sample of these loanwords.

Comparison between Sanskrit and Modern Balinese
English	Sanskrit	Balinese	
English	Sanskrit	Low language register	High language register
sky	ambara	langit	ambara
to agree	anugraha	pabaang	anugraha
to sign	cihna	ciri	cihna
intelligence	pradnya	dueg	pradnya
year	warsa	tiban	warsa
clothes	wastra	kamen	wastra
because of	karana	karana	mawinan
route	marga	marga	margi
plant	mula	mula	tandur

== Bibliography ==
- Kempers, A.J. Bernet (11 June 2013). Monumental Bali: Introduction to Balinese Archaeology & Guide to the Monuments. Tuttle Publishing. ISBN 9781462911547.
- Prasetyo, Bagyo; Nastiti, Titi Surti; Simanjuntak, Truman (28 January 2021). Austronesian Diaspora: A New Perspective. Gadjah Mada University Press. ISBN 9786023862023.
- Caillat, Colette; de Casparis, Johannes Gijsbertus (1991). Middle Indo-Aryan and Jaina Studies. Brill.
- Tryon, Darrell T. (June 2011). Comparative Austronesian Dictionary: An Introduction to Austronesian Studies. De Gruyter. ISBN 9783110884012.
- Tryon, Darrell T.; Dutton, Tom (14 December 2010). Language Contact and Change in the Austronesian World. De Gruyter. ISBN 9783110883091.
- de Casparis, Johannes Gijsbertus (6 December 2021). Indonesian Chronology. Brill. ISBN 9789004482746.
- Brown, E. Keith; Anderson, Anne (24 November 2005). Encyclopedia of Language and Linguistics. Elsevier Science. ISBN 9780080547848.
- Zurbuchen, Mary Sabina (14 July 2014). The Language of Balinese Shadow Theater. Princeton University Press. ISBN 9781400858767.
- Pigeaud, Theodore G. TH. (29 June 2013). Literature of Java. Springer Netherlands. ISBN 9789401525671.
