= Balinese language =

Austronesian language spoken in Indonesia

Balinese
- Basa Bali, Bhāṣa Bali^{1} ᬩᬲᬩᬮᬶ, ᬪᬵᬱᬩᬮᬶ^{1}
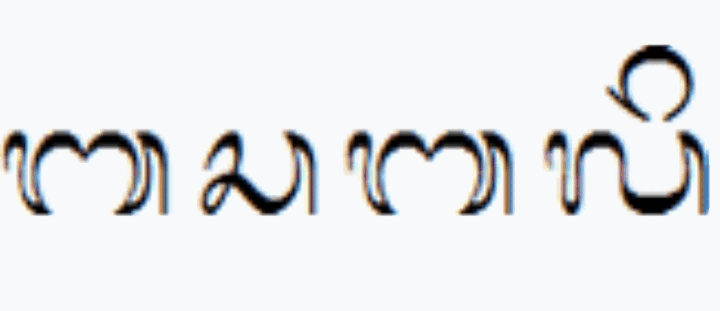
- Basa Bali written in Balinese script
- Pronunciation: [ˈbasə ˈbali] (standard) [ˈbaso ˈbali] (southern Bali, central Bali, western Bali, and Bangli dialects)[ˈbasa ˈbali] (Bali Aga dialect)
- Native to: Indonesia
- Region: Bali, Nusa Penida, Western Lombok, Eastern Java, Southern Sumatra, Sulawesi
- Ethnicity: Balinese; Bali Aga; Nak Nusé; Loloan Malays; Balinese Chinese
- Native speakers: (3.3 million cited 2000 census)
- Language family: Austronesian: Malayo-Polynesian; Malayo-Sumbawan (?); Bali–Sasak–Sumbawa; Balinese
- Early forms: Proto-Austronesian: Proto-Malayo-Polynesian; Proto-Bali–Sasak–Sumbawa; Old Balinese; Middle Balinese
- Standard forms: Standard Balinese; Kapara Balinese (in the register level)
- Dialects: Lowland Bali (Buleleng · Denpasar · Badung · Karangasem · Gianyar · Tabanan · Jembrana · Klungkung); Highland Bali (Bangli · Bali Aga); Nusa Penida; Lombok
- Writing system: Latin script (Balinese Latin alphabet); Balinese script

Official status
- Regulated by: Badan Pengembangan dan Pembinaan Bahasa Lembaga Bahasa, Aksara dan Sastra Bali

Language codes
- ISO 639-2: ban
- ISO 639-3: ban
- Glottolog: bali1278
- Balinese is the majority language where vast majority are first language speakers Balinese is the majority language, with other languages being spoken largely or as a second language (such as Javanese, Sasak, and Malay) Balinese is a minority language

Balinese language speaker (speaking in basa singgih, high register)

Balinese (/ˈbɑːlɪniːz/ bah-lih-NEEZ; endonym: Basa Bali, Balinese script: ᬩᬲᬩᬮᬶ, pronounced [ˈbasə ˈbali]) is an Austronesian language spoken primarily by the Balinese people on the Indonesian island of Bali, as well as Nusa Penida, western Lombok, and eastern Java, and also spread to southern Sumatra, and Sulawesi. Most Balinese speakers also use Indonesian. The 2000 national census recorded 3.3 million people speakers of Balinese with only 1 million people still using the Balinese language in their daily lives according to the Bali Cultural Agency estimated in 2011.

The 2000 national census recorded 3.3 million people speakers of Balinese, however the Bali Cultural Agency estimated in 2011 that the number of people still using the Balinese language in their daily lives is under 1 million. The language has been classified as "not endangered" by Glottolog.

Balinese is a part of the Bali-Sasak-Sumbawa languages groups, which consists of Balinese, Sasak language on Lombok and Sumbawa language on Sumbawa island.

The higher registers of the language borrow extensively from Javanese: an old form of classical Javanese, Kawi, is used in Bali as a religious and ceremonial language, while most of Balinese speakers use the low register known as Kapara Balinese as their everyday language. Most speakers of Balinese also speak Indonesian for official and commercial purposes as well as a means to communicate with non-Balinese-speaking Indonesians.

== Classification and Historical Development ==
Balinese is an Austronesian language belonging to the Malayo-Polynesian branch of the family. Within Malayo-Polynesian, it is part of the Bali–Sasak–Sumbawa subgroup. Internally, Balinese has two distinct varieties; Lowland (incl. Lombok dialect) and Highland Balinese (incl. Nusa Penida dialect).

Although clearly related, Balinese is set apart from Sasak and Sumbawa by a more elaborated voice (verbal) system, indicating its own developmental path within the subgroup. Like other Malayo-Polynesian languages, it has been shaped throughout its history as much by contact with neighbouring languages as by internal change.

The earliest and most far-reaching contact was with Sanskrit and, above all, with Old Javanese (Kawi), the literary language of the Hindu–Buddhist courts whose influence reached Bali in the first millennium. Kawi still functions in Bali as a religious and ceremonial language, and it supplied most of the vocabulary of the higher, more refined registers of modern Balinese. This long literary contact explains why the language today combines an inherited Austronesian core with a substantial layer of borrowed Javanese and Sanskrit forms, especially visible in formal speech and in the older written tradition recorded in the Balinese script (Aksara Bali).

== Demographics and current situation ==
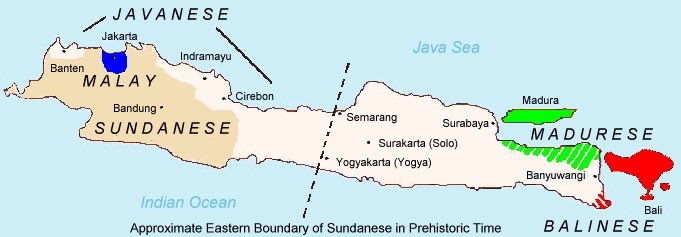
Distribution map of the Balinese language in Bali and Java islands (red)

According to the 2000 census, the Balinese language is spoken by 3.3 million people in Indonesia, mainly concentrated on the island of Bali and the surrounding areas.

In 2011, the Bali Cultural Agency estimated that the number of people still using the Balinese language in their daily lives on Bali Island does not exceed 1 million, as in urban areas their parents only introduce the Indonesian language or even English as a foreign language, while daily conversations in the institutions and the mass media have disappeared. The written form of the Balinese language is increasingly unfamiliar and most Balinese people use the Balinese language only as a means of oral communication, often mixing it with Indonesian in their daily speech. However, in the transmigration areas outside Bali Island, the Balinese language is extensively used and believed to play an important role in the survival of the language.

In the present day, Balinese coexists with Indonesian, the national language, which dominates education, government, and the mass media, as well as most formal and commercial communication. The spread of a dominant national language is a central driver of language shift among the regional languages of Austronesian Indonesia, and Balinese clearly displays this pressure. Following the general pattern of contact-induced change, in which borrowing usually begins with vocabulary and may gradually extend to grammar. Indonesian has supplied everyday Balinese with new words, and Balinese–Indonesian code-switching has become routine in casual conversation.

This pressure is most visible among younger speakers, who increasingly turn to Indonesian for functions once served by the higher Balinese registers, and whose command of high vocabulary tends to be narrower than that of older generations. English adds a further layer of contact through Bali’s large tourism industry, where it functions as a lingua franca of commerce. Studies of the linguistic landscape show that English dominates the commercial signage of tourist centres such as Kuta and Ubud, where it carries economic value and prestige, while Balinese is increasingly reduced to a symbolic, identity-marking role.

Although the 2000 census recorded about 3.3 million speakers, the Bali Cultural Agency estimated in 2011 that fewer than one million people still used Balinese in daily life, a gap that reflects concern over intergenerational transmission. In response, the provincial government has sought to protect the language through schooling and regulation. Bali’s 2018 regulations on the Balinese language, script, and literature mandate their use in public space, and the presence of Balinese script on public signage has since recovered in tourist areas, where it had previously been largely confined to temples and other cultural sites.

== Dialects ==
Balinese has 2 main dialects, the Lowland dialect and the Highland dialect, the Lombok dialect is generally classified as part of the lowland dialect while the Nusa Penida dialect is still debated, but is often classified as a subset of the highland dialect. The difference between the two dialects lies in the variety of vocabulary, phonology, and usage of register (e.g. High register vs. Low register). Highland dialect, also referred as Bali Aga dialect, has fewer high register variations, while the lowland dialect recognises both high register and low register.

=== Lowland dialect ===
The lowland varieties are spoken across the plains and coastal districts which defined by phonological, morphological, and lexical innovations and most notably within the elaboration of the register; speech-level system that developed through contact with Old Javanese and which the Bali Aga (highland varieties) lack. Due to of these contact shared innovations, the lowland group is generally treated as the basis standard of Balinese; at the 1974 congress on standardisation, the varieties of Buleleng (the capital is Singaraja) and Klungkung were recommended as models, partly because Singaraja had long served as a colonial-era administrative, educational and literary centre.

The lowland varieties are difference by themselves, often along the lines of the former regional districts (Klungkung, Bangli, Karangasem, Buleleng, Gianyar, Badung, Tabanan, and Jembrana) with variation sometimes occurring over only a few kilometres. The largest internal division is between the northern and eastern varieties (Buleleng, Klungkung, and Karangasem) and the southern variety of Denpasar greater area. A salient grammatical difference is that the Denpasar variety tends to lose or neutralise the verbal and nominal suffixes that the norther and eastern varieties retain in full.

Phonologically, the Lowland variety that Clynes (1995) describe for Singaraja has eighteen consonants and six vowels. Its apical stop /t/ is alveolar rather than dental, a feature that distinguishes Balinese from many other western Indonesian languages, including Indonesian in which /t/ is dental. In addition, word-final /k/ is normally realised as a glottal stop, /h/ is dropped in syllable onsets in casual speech, stress falls on the final syllable, and an orthographic word-final ⟨a⟩ is pronounced as a schwa [ə].

A multilingual man speaking in Balinese dialects (Buleleng, Jembrana, Tabanan, Bangli, Klungkung, Gianyar, Karangasem)

=== Highland dialect ===
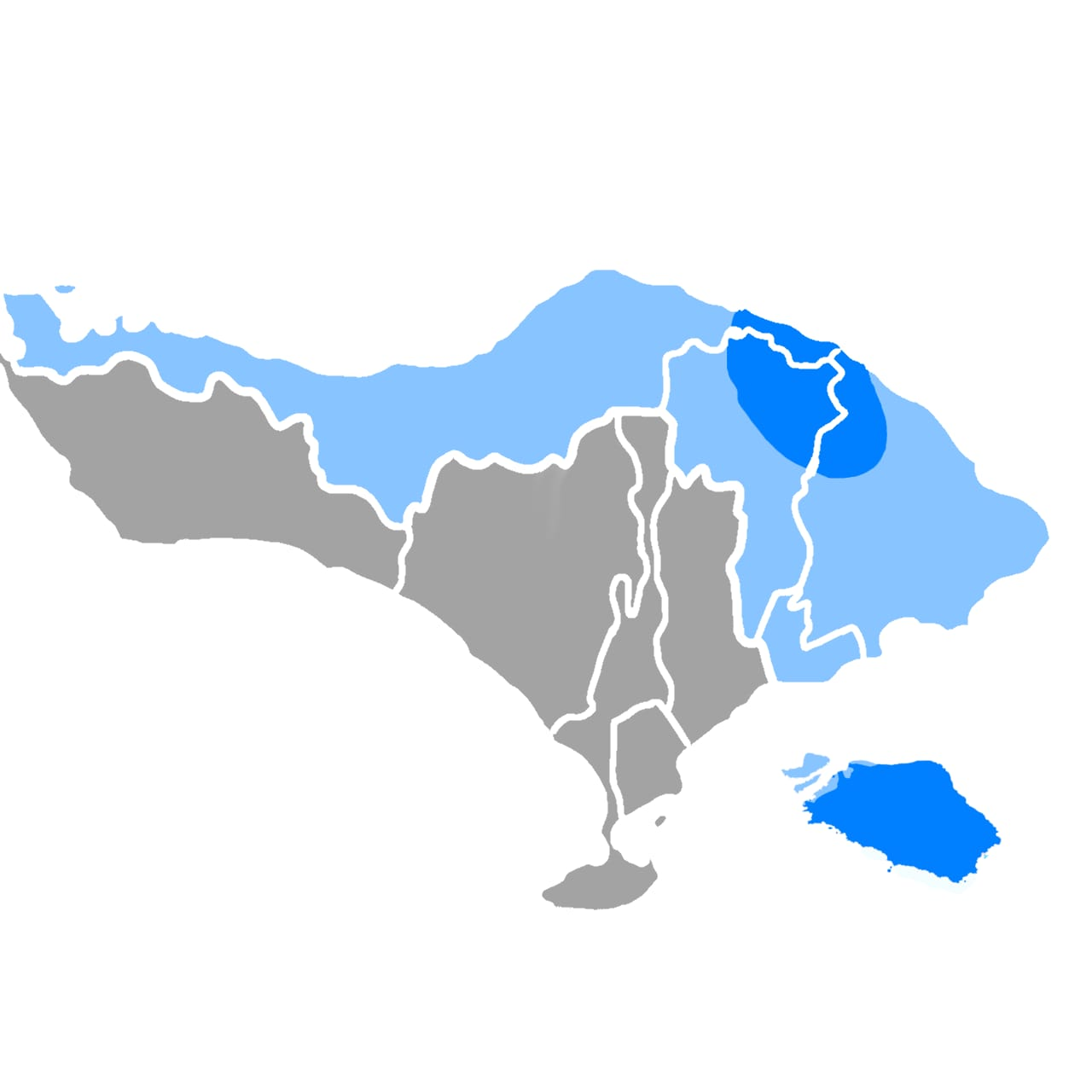
Distribution map of Highland Balinese languages (the map does not show the distribution in Badung and Tabanan regencies)

The highland dialect, also known as Bali Aga dialect (because most of the speakers are indigenous people of Bali, the Bali Agas) is a dialect of the Balinese language spoken by the Bali Aga people in mountainous areas and northern part of Bali, especially in the mountain range of Kintamani, and regencies nearby such as Bangli, Buleleng, and Karangasem, as well in Nusa Penida. According to Bawa (1983:394), the highland dialect is grouped into three main usage areas, namely the eastern, northern, and western regions which are detailed as follows:

- The eastern region of Bali Island which includes Karangasem Regency, Kintamani District (or around Lake Batur), Klungkung Regency, parts of East Buleleng, and Nusa Penida;
- Northern Badung mountainous region;
- The western region of Bali Island, which includes Pupuan district, Penebel district (precisely in Wongaya Gede village), and parts of West Buleleng and North Tabanan (precisely in Sepang, Padawa, and Bantiran villages).

Overall, there are two Highland sub-dialects that are distinct from varieties spoken in the area mentioned. Those sub-dialects are Nusa Penida dialect, spoken mostly in Nusa Penida, and Kapara dialect (also called as Bali Kapara) notably spoken in Sembiran village, Tejakula District, Buleleng Regency with an estimated 4,883 users. Nusa Penida dialect was thought to be a different dialect, but there is some indication that Nusa Penida dialect might be a sub-dialect of the highland dialect. According to Jendra, et al. (1997), both Nusa Penida and Highland dialects share the same phonological pattern as explained below:

- presences of /h/ in the middle of word, such as in /bəhas/;
- presences of /-ñə/ and /-cə/ affix or in the final-word position as allophony of /-ə/;
- the intonation of speakers' speech tends to have a fast tempo and louder stress

However, there are other notable differences between the two dialects, namely the absence or reduction of the distribution of the phoneme /a/ in word-final positions.

A man speak Bali Aga Balinese dialect, recorded in Kintamani

==== Nusa Penida dialect ====
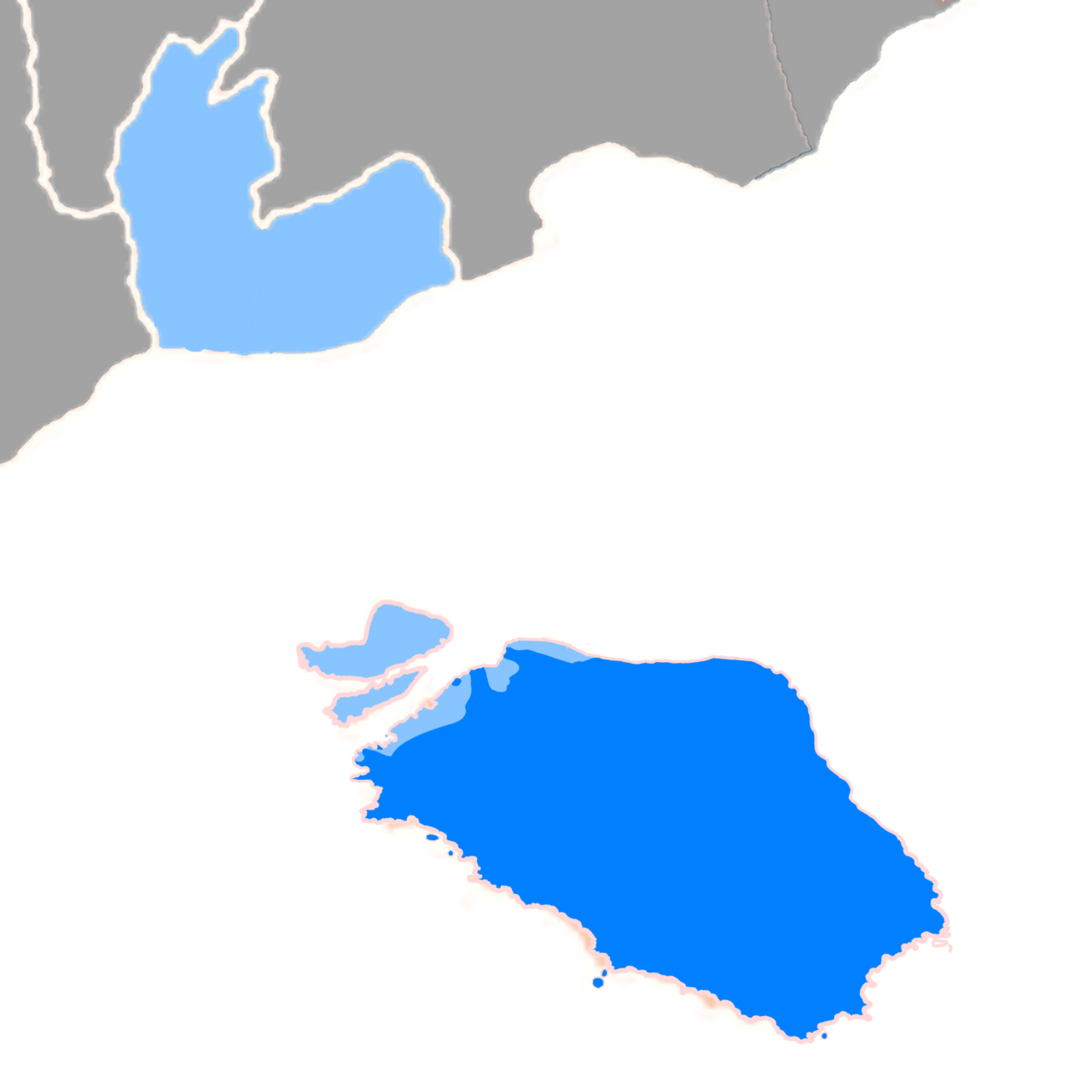
Distribution map of Nusa Penida Balinese dialect

Currently, the Nusa Penida dialect is widely used only in Nusa Penida in Klungkung Regency. However, not all communities in Nusa Penida use the Nusa Penida dialect. There are several groups of people who communicate using different dialects. On the islands of Nusa Lembongan and Nusa Ceningan, which are located next to Nusa Penida, as well as in a small part of Nusa Penida close to these islands, there is a distinct dialect that is quite different from the Nusa Penida dialect. One of the most striking differences is in words like éda (you) and kola (I) in the Nusa Penida dialect. Speakers of the Nusa Lembongan dialect use words like cai or ci (you) and cang (I). Another example is əndək (Nusa Penida dialect) and tusing or sing' (Nusa Lembongan dialect), géléng-cenik, hangkén-kénkén, and so on. Only 13 out of 16 villages in Nusa Penida use the Nusa Penida dialect. The remaining villages either speak the Nusa Lembongan and Nusa Ceningan dialect or a dialect resembling mainland Klungkung Balinese like dialect that spoken in Kampung Toyapakeh village, one of the villages in Nusa Penida that does not speak the Nusa Penida dialect.

The Nusa Penida dialect is also used outside Nusa Penida, mainly due to the migration of its speakers following the eruption of Mount Agung in 1963. Significant speakers relocated to southern Sumatra, particularly to Bandar Lampung, Palembang, Mesuji, and South Lampung.

A village man speak everyday Nusa Penida Balinese dialect

=== Lombok dialect ===
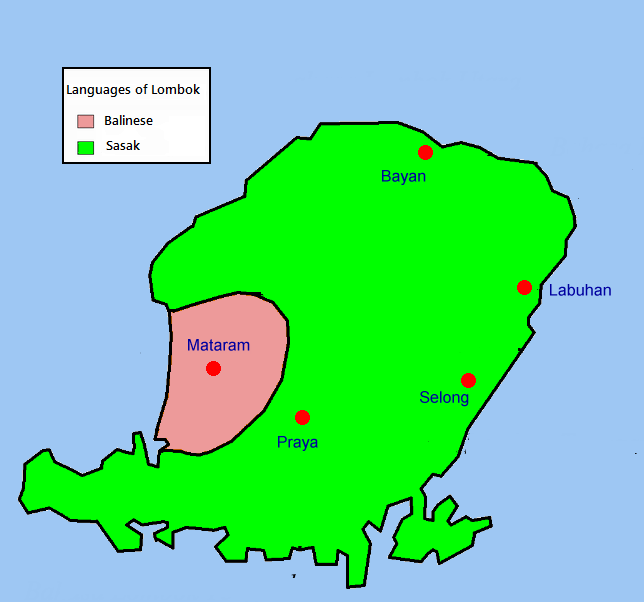
Linguistic map of Lombok, based on 1981 data. Balinese speakers shown in red area.

The Balinese spoken in Lombok is a dialect of the Balinese language of Bali. Based on regional classification, it comprises two dialect groups: the Pl (Pencilan) dialect (an outlier dialect) and the Mt dialect (a metropolitan dialect). Throughout their development, both dialects have been strongly influenced by the Sasak language and other regional languages on Lombok Island. Lexical innovation in Lombok Balinese occurs in two forms: internal innovation and external innovation. Internal innovation may take the form of sound changes, sound additions, and sound deletions. External innovation, meanwhile, is primarily reflected in influence from Sasak. The distribution of Sasak loan elements across the two dialects is uneven, with isolated dialects exhibiting a higher frequency of Sasak borrowings than non-isolated dialects. The Pl dialect, an outlier dialect, exhibits lower levels of internal innovation. By contrast, the Mt dialect, spoken near the island's economic, governmental, and cultural centers, exhibits a higher degree of internal innovation.

== Phonology ==
=== Vowels ===
Balinese vowels
	Front	Central	Back
High	i		u
Mid	e	ə	o
Low		a	

The official spelling denotes both /a/ and final /ə/ by ⟨a⟩. However, ⟨a⟩ is usually pronounced [ə] when it ends a word, and [ə] occurs also in prefixes ma-, pa- and da-. In non-final positions, /ə/ is denoted by ⟨e⟩.

=== Consonants ===
Balinese consonants
	Labial		Alveolar		Palatal		Velar		Glottal
Nasal		m		n		ɲ		ŋ	
Stop/Affricate	p	b	t	d	tʃ	dʒ	k	g	
Fricative			s						h
Approximant		w		l		j			
Trill				r					

Depending on dialect, the phoneme /t/ is realized as a voiceless alveolar or retroflex stop. This is in contrast with most other languages in western Indonesia (including Standard Indonesian), which have a dental /t/ patterning with an otherwise alveolar phoneme series.

=== Stress ===
Stress falls on the last syllable.

== Writing system ==
Balinese has been written in two different writing systems: the Balinese script, and in modern times the Latin script.

=== Balinese script ===
Basic signs of the Balinese script Note: The script is arranged in Javanese order.

The Balinese script (Aksara Bali, ᬅᬓ᭄ᬱᬭᬩᬮᬶ), which is arranged as Hanacaraka (ᬳᬦᬘᬭᬓ), is an abugida, ultimately derived from the Brāhmī script of India. The earliest known inscriptions date from the 9th century AD.

Few people today are familiar with the Balinese script. The Balinese script is almost the same as the Javanese script.

=== Latin alphabet ===
Schools in Bali today teach a Latin alphabet known as Tulisan Bali. The standard alphabet is as follow:

Letter	Name (Balinese)	IPA	Diacritics
A, a	a [a]	/a/	–
B, b	bé [be]	/b/	–
C, c	cé [ce]	/t͡ʃ/	–
D, d	dé [de]	/d/	–
E, e	é [e]	/e/ or /ə/	É, é
F, f	éf [ef]	/f/	–
G, g	gé [ge]	/g/	–
H, h	ha [ha]	/h/	–
I, i	i [i]	/i/	–
J, j	jé [d͡ʒe]	/d͡ʒ/	–
K, k	ka [ka]	/k/	–
L, l	él [el]	/l/	–
M, m	ém [em]	/m/	–
N, n	én [en]	/n/	–
O, o	o [o]	/o/	–
P, p	pé [pe]	/p/	–
Q, q	ki [ki]	/k/ (loanwords)	–
R, r	ér [er]	/r/	–
S, s	és [es]	/s/	–
T, t	té [te]	/t/	–
U, u	u [u]	/u/	–
V, v	fé [fe]	/f/ (loanwords)	–
W, w	wé [we]	/w/	–
X, x	éks [eks]	/ks/ (loanwords)	–
Y, y	yé [je]	/j/	–
Z, z	zét [zet]	/z/ (loanwords)	–

The Balinese spelling system using Latin letters was implemented in 1974. This spelling system was implemented after the government established the Improved Spelling System (Eyd) for Indonesian in 1972. The purpose of implementing the EyD Bali Latin was to standardize the Balinese language without eliminating its unique characteristics. The EyD Bali Latin is based on the 26-letter Latin alphabet with 1 diacritic namely É. Several consonants such as /f/, /kh/, /q/, /sy/, /v/, /z/, /x/ are used to write foreign loanwords.

== Grammar ==
Balinese is agglutinative. Verb and noun inflectional morphology is similarly minimal to Indonesian, but derivational morphology is extensive.

=== Affixes ===
Of the two dative suffixes, -ang and -in, the latter should be used if the object is animate. The suffix -né / -é marks nouns for both definiteness and possession.

=== Nouns & modifiers ===
Nouns come before their modifiers, and are often marked with a deictic word, ento 'that' or ené 'this,'" to show that any modifiers act as modifiers instead of as verbs. The definite marker can also be attached to modifiers, especially any which conveys "an inherent property of its referent." Adjectives following possessive (and therefore definite) nouns function as predicative, while adjectives following unmarked nouns function as attributive.

=== Verbs ===
Two types of serial verb constructions occur in Balinese. Both verbs are always fully inflected, but in the first type, the verbs have the same agent, whereas in the second, the object of the first verb is the subject of the second.

=== Word order & voices ===
The word order is similar to that of Indonesian, and verb and noun inflectional morphology is similarly minimal. However, derivational morphology is extensive, and suffixes are applied to indicate definite or indefinite articles, and optionally to indicate possession.

The default, unmarked word order of Balinese is Patient Verb Agent. If the agent is a third person pronoun, it is attached to the verb as the clitic suffix -a.

This default word order can be reversed (Agent Verb Patient) with a nasal prefix on the verb. The nasal-marked word order cannot be an active construction, because it is marked, nor can it be antipassive, because the patient can't be omitted. It is considered a second type of transitive voice.

There is a true passive voice (Patient Verb Agent) borrowed from Javanese and marked by the verbal prefix ka-. It is used mostly in high registers. If the agent of this passive construction is third-person, it must be preceded by a preposition. If it is not third-person, it cannot be preceded by a preposition.

The second true passive voice (Patient Verb), marked by the verbal prefix ma-, always omits the agent. It connotes a complete event and is only available to some verbs.

== Vocabulary ==
=== Registers ===
A defining feature of Balinese is its system of speech levels (sor-singgih, also called unda-usuk), through which speakers mark the social relationship between themselves, the addressee, and the person referred to. The system is primarily lexical: choosing a low, middle, or high word for the same concept encodes politeness and relative status, so that social information is carried mainly by vocabulary rather than by grammar. Most everyday interaction uses the low or common register (basa kapara), whereas the high register (basa singgih), built largely from Javanese loanwords, is reserved for formal, ceremonial, and respectful contexts and is now fluently commanded by relatively few speakers.

Even though most basic vocabulary in Balinese and Indonesian originates from Austronesian and Sanskrit, many cognates sound quite different between languages. Balinese has three different registers: low (basa ketah), middle (basa madia), and high (basa singgih), the uses of which depend on the relationship and status of those speaking and those being spoken about, and most of Balinese speakers use the low register also known as Kapara Balinese or Common Balinese language (from Kepara which literally means 'commonplace'). High Balinese is not commonly used except to speak to pedandas, so few are fluent in it, and built largely from Javanese loanwords and it is reserved for formal ceremonial context.

The common mutations in inherited Balinese words are:

- r > h / #_, r > h / V_V, and r > h / _#. That is, r mutates into h at the beginning of every word, the end of every word, and between any two vowels.
- h > ø / !_#. The phoneme h is lost everywhere except at the ends of words.

However, these mutations are not expressed in High Balinese, indicating that High Balinese contains many loanwords from Sanskrit and (Old) Javanese. These loanwords are identical in sound to their modern Javanese cognates, but reflect fifteenth-century usages from Old Javanese.

In the standard Balinese the final orthographic -a is a schwa [ə].

Basic Vocabulary Comparison
English	Low Balinese	High Balinese	Indonesian	Old Javanese	Javanese
this	ené	niki	ini	iki	iki (ngoko), punika (krama)
that	ento	nika	itu	ika	iku, kuwi, (ngoko), menika (krama)
here	dini	driki	di sini		kéné (ngoko), mriki, ngriki (krama)
there	ditu	drika	di sana, di situ		kana (ngoko), mriku, ngriku, mrika, ngrika (krama)
what	apa	napi	apa		apa (ngoko) punapa, menapa (krama)
human	manusa, jelema	jadma	manusia	jadma	uwong, manungsa (ngoko) tiyang, jalma (krama)
hair	bok	rambut	rambut	rambut	rambut (ngoko), rikma (krama)
fire	api	gni	api	gĕni	geni
child	panak	pianak, oka	anak		anak (ngoko) putra, siwi (krama)
life	idup	urip	hidup	urip	urip (ngoko), gesang (krama)
to drink	nginem	nginem	minum	manginum	ngombé (ngoko), ngunjuk (krama)
big	gedé	ageng	besar, gede	gĕḍe	gedhé (ngoko), ageng (krama)
new	baru	anyar	baru	(h)añar	anyar (ngoko), énggal (krama)
day	wai	rahina	hari	rahina	dina (ngoko), dinten (krama)
sun	matan ai	surya	matahari	surya	sréngéngé (ngoko), surya (krama)
lake	danu	tlaga	danau	ranu	tlaga, ranu
egg	taluh	taluh	telur	ĕṇḍog	endhog (ngoko), tigan (krama)
friend	timpal	suwitra	teman	kañca, mitra, sakhā	kanca, kenalan, mitra
to sightsee	melali-lali	malelancaran	tamasya		
name	adan	parab, wastan	nama	(h)aran, parab	aran, jeneng (ngoko), wasta (krama), asma (krama inggil)
to be, to become	dadi	dados	menjadi		dadi (ngoko), dados (krama)
to stay	nongos	meneng	tinggal		manggon (ngoko), manggén (krama)
from	uling	saking	dari		saka (ngoko), saking (krama)
right	beneh	patut	benar		bener (ngoko), leres (krama)
where	kija	ring kija	kemana		menyang endi (ngoko) dhateng pundi (krama)
home	umah, homah (Nusa Penida)	jero, griya	rumah		omah (ngoko) griya, dalem (krama)
done	suba	sampun	sudah		wis (ngoko), sampun (krama)
all	onya	sami, makasami	semua		kabéh (ngoko), sedaya (krama)
with	ajak	sareng	dengan		karo (ngoko), kaliyan (krama)
hat, cap	topong, capil	topong	topi		topi, caping
island	pulo	nusa	pulau		pulo
to invite	ngajak	ngiring	mengajak		ngajak

=== Numerals ===
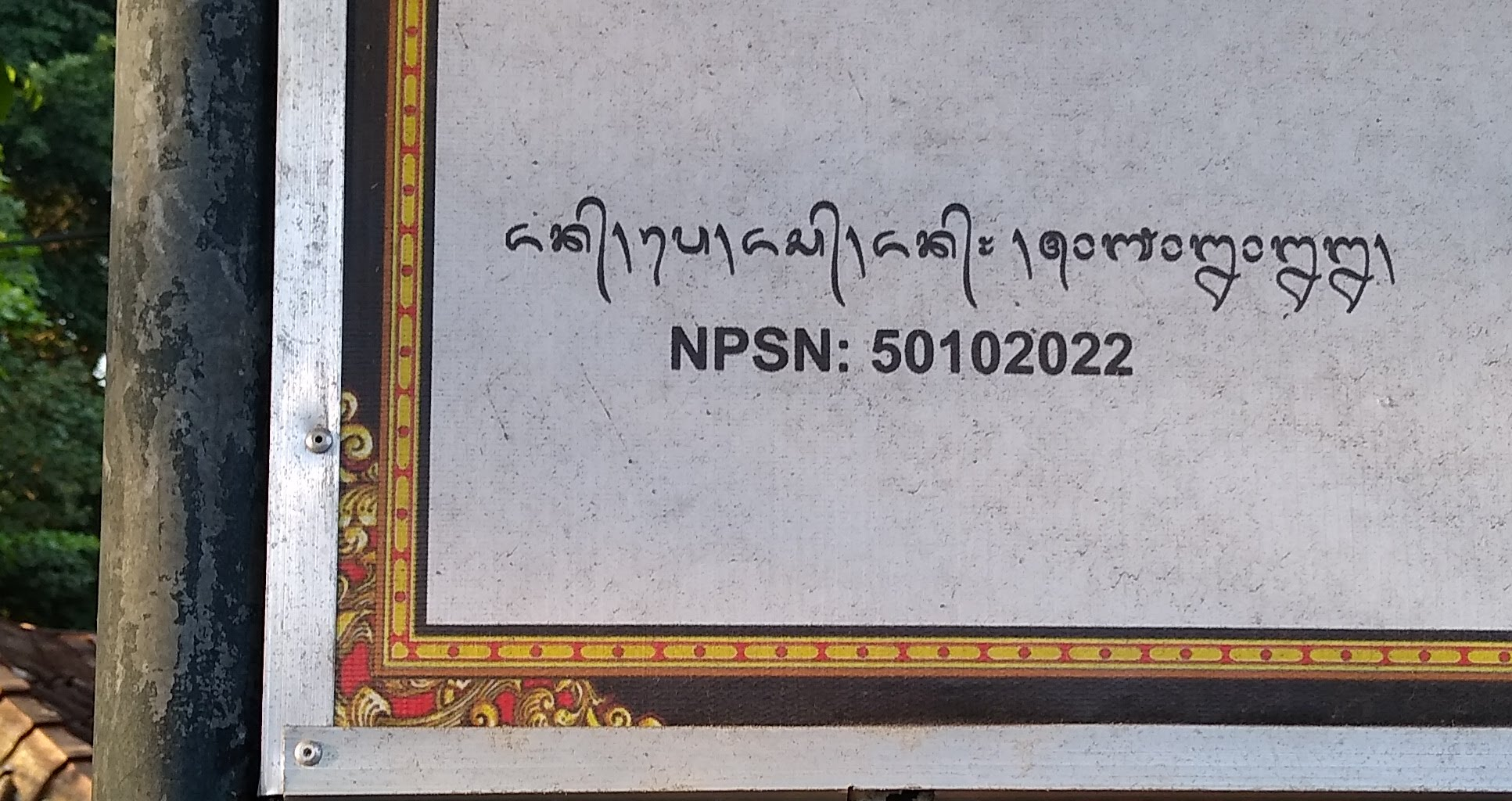
A school identification number in Bali, written with Balinese numerals above and Arabic numerals below

Balinese has a decimal numeral system, but this is complicated by numerous words for intermediate quantities such as 45, 175, and 1600.

==== Basic numerals ====
The numerals 1–10 have basic, combining, and independent forms, many of which are formed through reduplication. The combining forms are used to form higher numbers. In some cases there is more than one word for a numeral, reflecting the Balinese register system; halus (high-register) forms are listed in italics.

In the standard Balinese the final orthographic -a is a schwa [ə].

Numeral	Basic	Combining	Independent
1	besik	a-, sa-*	abesik, aukud
1	(a)siki	a-, sa-*	abesik, aukud
2	dua	duang-	dadua
2	kalih	kalih-	kakalih
3	telu	telung-	tetelu
3	tiga	tigang-	tetiga
4	(em)pat	petang-	pa(t)pat
5	lima	limang-	lelima
6	(e)nem	nem-	ne(m)nem
7	pitu	pitung-	pepitu
8	(a)kutus	kutus-, ulung-	akutus
9	(a)sia	sia-, sangang-	asia
10	(a)dasa	dasa-	adasa

==== Teens, tweens, and tens ====
Like English, Balinese has compound forms for the teens and tens; however, it also has a series of compound 'tweens', 21–29. The teens are based on a root *-welas, the tweens on -likur, and the tens are formed by the combining forms above. Hyphens are not used in the orthography, but have been added to the table below to clarify their derivation.

Unit	Teens	Tweens	Tens
1	solas 11	se-likur 21	(a-dasa 10)
2	rolas 12	dua-likur 22	duang-dasa 20
2	rolas 12	kalih-likur	kalih-dasa
3	telu-las 13	telu-likur 23	telung-dasa 30
3	telu-las 13	tigang-likur	tigang-dasa
4	pat-belas 14	pat-likur 24	petang-dasa 40
5	lim-olas 15	salaé 25	seket 50
6	nem-belas 16	nem-likur 26	nem-dasa 60
7	pitu-las 17	pitu-likur 27	pitung-dasa 70
8	pelekutus 18	ulu-likur 28	kutus-dasa, ulung-dasa 80
9	siang-olas 19	sanga-likur 29	sia-dasa, sangang-dasa 90

The high-register combining forms kalih- 2 and tigang- 3 are used with -likur, -dasa, and higher numerals (below), but not for the teens.

The teens are from Javanese, where the -olas forms are regular, apart from pele-kutus 18, which is suppletive. Sa-laé 25 (one thread [of 25 Chinese coins]), and se-ket 50 (one tie [of two threads of coins]) are also suppletive, and cognate with Javanese səlawé 25 and səkət 50.

There are additional numerals pasasur ~ sasur 35 and se-timahan ~ se-timan 45 (one opium packet [costing 45 coins]), and a compound telung-benang (three threads [of coins]) for 75.

* A less productive combining form of a- 1 is sa-, as can be seen in many of the numbers below. It, ulung-, and sangang- are from Javanese. Tiga 3 is from Sanskrit trika. Dasa 10 is from Sanskrit daśa.

==== Higher numbers ====
The unit combining forms are combined with atus 100, atak 200, amas 400, tali 1000, laksa 10,000, keti 100,000, and yuta 1,000,000 as they do with dasa 10:

100	s-atus
200	s-atak
300	telung-atus (tigang-atus)
400	s-amas
500	limang-atus
600	telung-atak (tigang-atak)
700	pitung-atus
800	domas ( ← *dua-amas or *ro-amas)
900	sanga
1000	siu
1200	(e)nem-bangsit
2000	duang-tali (kalih-tali)
1,000,000	a-yuta

Atak is a 'bundle' (of 200 coins) and amas is 'gold' (a gold coin being worth 400 copper coins). In addition, there is karobelah 150, lebak 175, and sepa (one pa?) for 1600. At least karobelah has a cognate in Javanese, ro-bəlah, where ro- is the short form for two (as in rolas 12).

=== Pronouns ===
Kinship terms can be used as pronouns. If these pronouns are used as agents, they refer to either the speaker or the listener, depending on context. Though first and second person pronouns need no antecedent to be understood, third person pronouns do.

=== Time ===
Instead of grammatical tense, Balinese uses temporal adverbs to talk about time.

Temporal deixis for the past
Adverb	Translation
mare	just, a few minutes ago
tuni	a few hours ago
(di) ibi	yesterday, a day ago
(di) puan (Note: The suffix -an can be added to make the expression indefinite. If -an is added, di is obligatory, unless the suffixed adverb is prefixed with ibi.)	two days ago
(di) telun	three days ago

For present tense, the adverb jani ("now") can be either definite or indefinite depending on context. Its more emphatic form, jani san ("right now"), is definite. The indefinite word ajanian ("up to now") refers to any time before or during the utterance.

Temporal deixis for the future
Adverb	Translation
(buin/bin) nyanan (Note: When used without buin, this expression can be indefinite without modification.) (Note: The suffix -an can be added to make the expression indefinite.)	later
(buin/bin) mani	tomorrow
buin/bin puan	two days from now
buin/bin telun	three days from now

The word buin/bin ("again") is obligatory for puan and telun to clarify that they are not being used for their past tense meanings. Mani, manian, and puan can all be prefixed with mani to refer to the future.

== Sample text ==
=== Article 1 of the Universal Declaration of Human Rights ===
Balinese script

ᬲᬫᬶᬫᬦᬸᬲᬦᬾᬲᬦᬾᬜ᭄ᬭᬸᬯᬤᬶᬯᬦ᭄ᬢᬄᬫᬭ᭄ᬤᬾᬓᬢᬸᬃᬫᬤᬸᬯᬾᬓᬳᬸᬢ᭄ᬢᬫᬳᬦ᭄ᬮᬦ᭄ᬳᬓ᭄ᬳᬓ᭄ᬲᬦᬾᬧᬢᭂᬄ᭟ᬲᬫᬶᬓᬮᬸᬕ᭄ᬭᬵᬳᬶᬦ᭄ᬧᬧᬶᬦᭂᬄᬮᬦ᭄ᬳᬶᬤᭂᬧ᭄ᬢᬸᬃᬫᬗ᭄ᬤᬦᬾᬧᬟᬫᬲᬯᬶᬢ᭄ᬭᬫᭂᬮᬭᬧᬦ᭄ᬲᭂᬫᬗᬢ᭄ᬧᬓᬸᬮᬯᬭ᭄ᬕᬳᬦ᭄᭞

Romanised

Sami manusané sané nyruwadi wantah mardéka tur maduwé kautamaan lan hak-hak sané pateh. Sami kalugrähin papineh lan idep tur mangdané paḍa masawitra melarapan semangat pakulawargaan.

IPA

/ˈsami manʊˈsane ˈsane ɲruˈwadi ˈwantaʰ mərˈdɛka tur maˈduwe kawtaˈmaan lan hakˈhak ˈsane ˈpatəh/ /ˈsami kaluˈgrahin paˈpineh lan iˈdəp tur maŋˈdane ˈpadə masaˈwitrə məlaˈrapan səmaˈŋat pakulawraˈgaan/

Sound sample

English

All human beings are born free and equal in dignity and rights. They are endowed with reason and conscience and should act towards one another in a spirit of brotherhood.

== Gallery ==
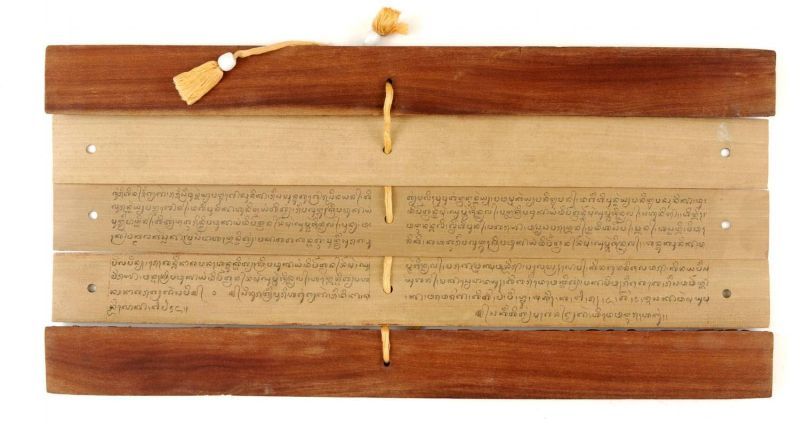
Balinese palm-leaf manuscript

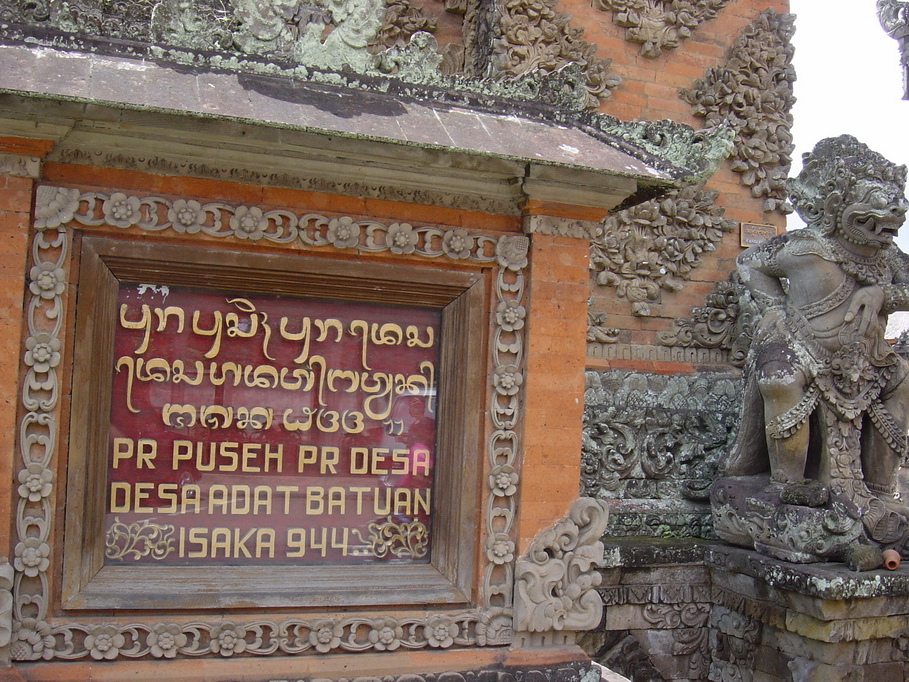
Sign at Pura Puseh Temple, Batuan, Bali

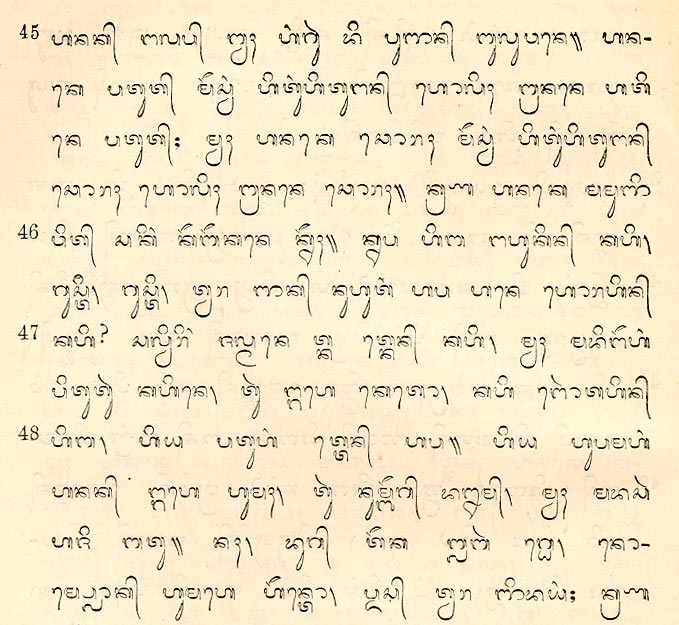
Page from a Bible printed with Balinese script

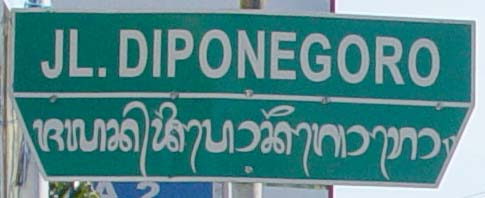
Street sign in Singaraja, written in Latin and Balinese script

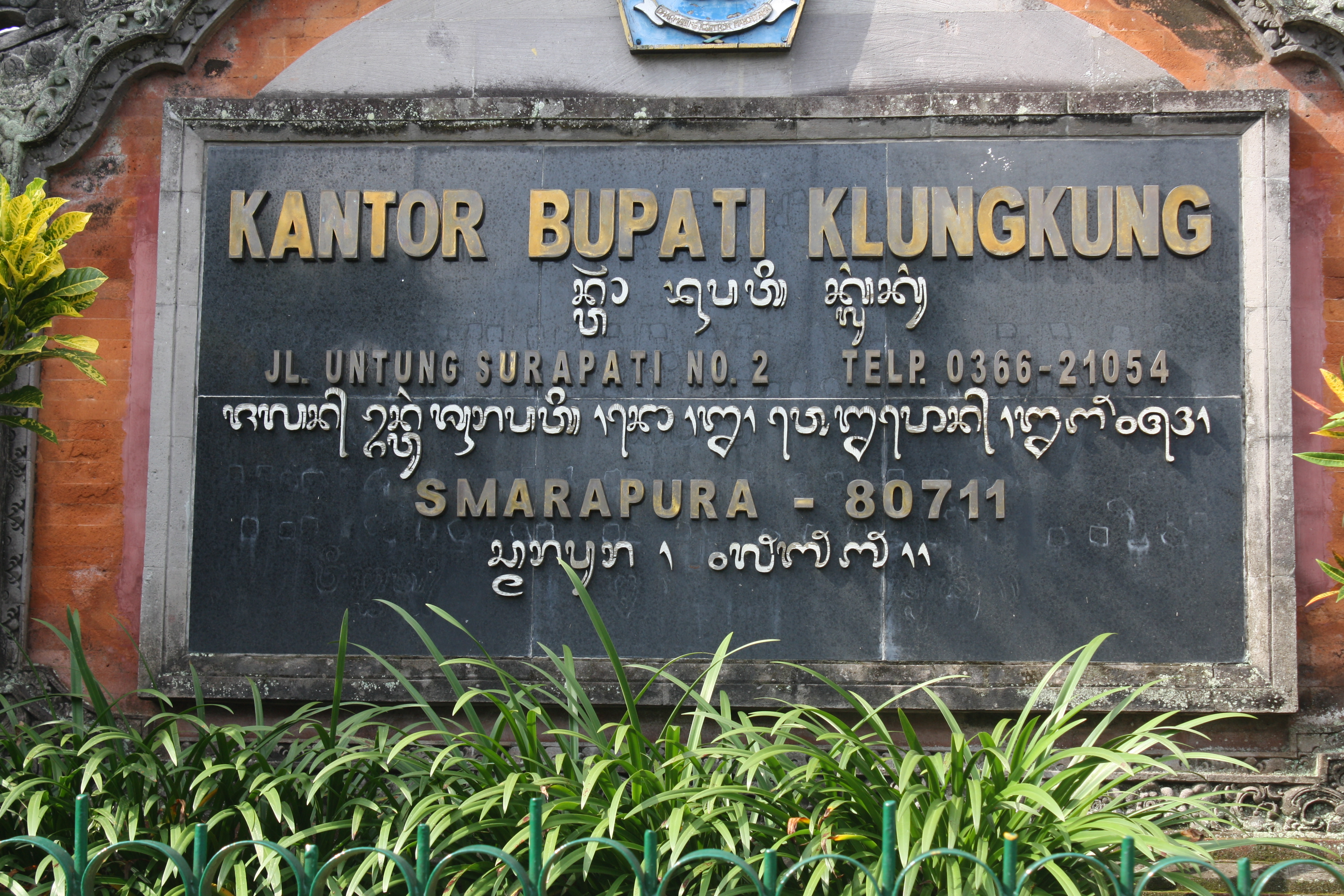
Klungkung Regent's Office sign

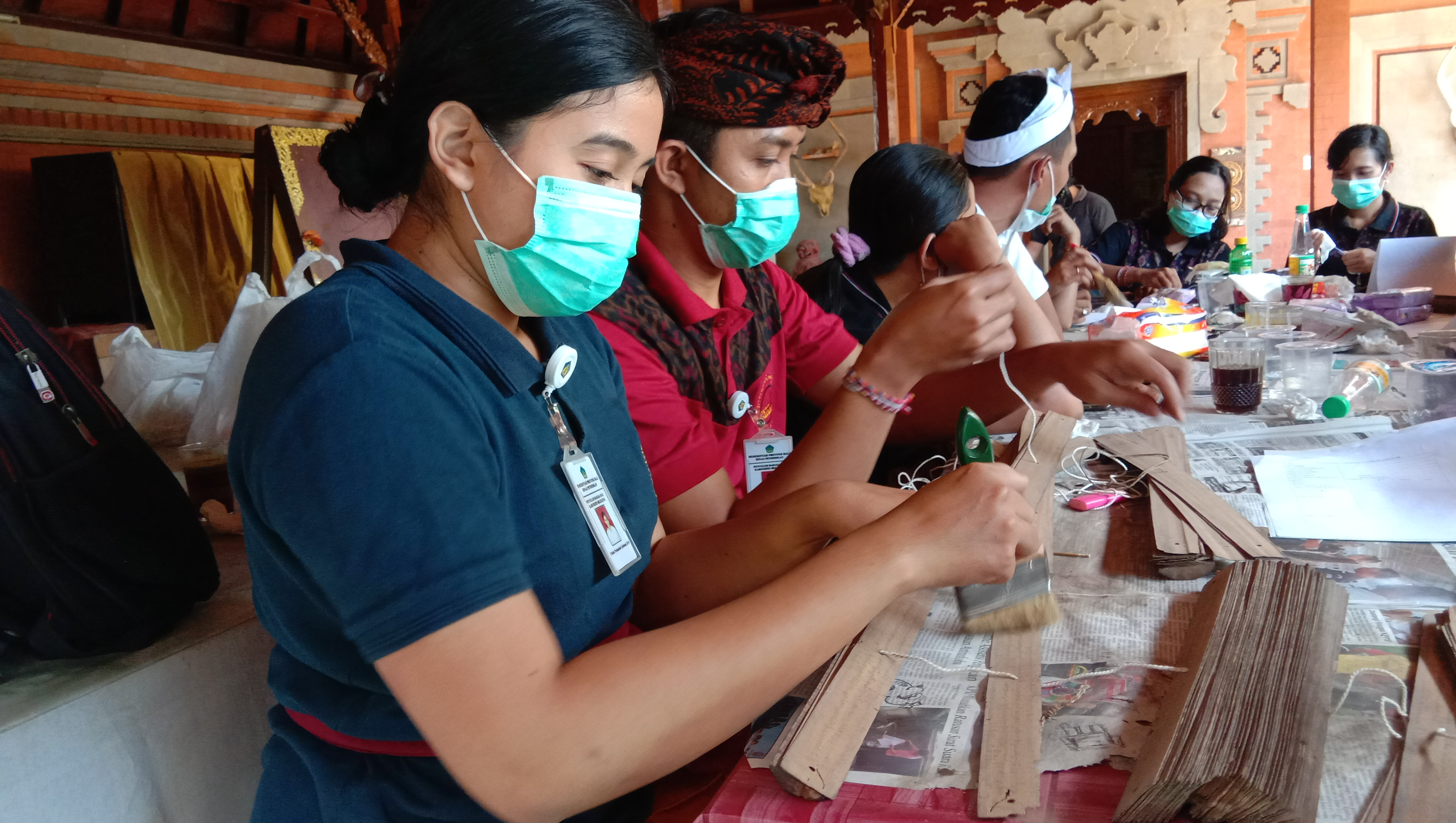
Lontar manuscript restoration

== Note ==
^1 In Balinese script, Sanskrit and Kawi loanwords tend use conservative orthography as standard form in Balinese script. The word for language, basa, in Balinese is a loanword from Old Javanese bhāṣa which came from the Sanskrit word भाषा bhāṣā, hence it is written according to Sanskrit and Old Javanese spelling ᬪᬵᬱᬩᬮᬶ in Balinese script. The ᬩᬲᬩᬮᬶ form in Balinese script is used by beginner writers. Meanwhile, diacritics are not written in the current romanization of the Balinese language. Thus, both ᬪᬵᬱᬩᬮᬶ and basa Bali are the standard forms.

== See also ==
- Balinese (Unicode block)
- BASABali, a wiki programme supporting the Balinese language

== Sources ==
- Tryon, Darrell T.; Dutton, Tom (14 December 2010). Language Contact and Change in the Austronesian World. De Gruyter. ISBN 9783110883091.
- de Casparis, Johannes Gijsbertus (6 December 2021). Indonesian Chronology. Brill. ISBN 9789004482746.
