= Bali–Sasak–Sumbawa languages =

Subgroup of the Austronesian language family

Bali–Sasak–Sumbawa
- Geographic distribution: Indonesia (Bali and West Nusa Tenggara)
- Linguistic classification: Austronesian: Malayo-Polynesian; Malayo-Sumbawan (?); Bali–Sasak–Sumbawa
- Proto-language: Proto-Bali–Sasak–Sumbawa
- Subdivisions: Balinese; Sasak–Sumbawa

Language codes
- Glottolog: bali1277
- Distribution of Bali-Sasak-Sumbawa languages: Balinese (blue), Sasak (red), and Sumbawa (orange).

The Bali–Sasak–Sumbawa languages are a group of closely related languages spoken in Indonesia in the western Lesser Sunda Islands (Bali and West Nusa Tenggara). The three languages largely correspond to the three separate islands where they are natively spoken, namely Balinese on Bali, Sasak on Lombok, and Sumbawa on western Sumbawa.

The Malayo Sumbawa languages (Bali-Sasak-Sumbawa languages are circled in green)

== Classification ==
Genealogically, Balinese forms a separate subbranch from Sasak and Sumbawa languages which are more closely related and share characteristics that are not found in Balinese; therefore the group's family tree is generally depicted as follows:

Bali–Sasak–Sumbawa

- Balinese
- Sasak–Sumbawa
  - Sasak
  - Sumbawa

These languages have similarities with Javanese, which several classifications have taken as evidence of a relationship between them. However, the similarities are with the "high" registers (formal language/royal speech) of Balinese and Sasak; when the "low" registers (commoner speech) are considered, the connection appears instead to be with Madurese and Malay. (See Malayo-Sumbawan languages.)

The position of the Bali–Sasak–Sumbawa languages within the Malayo-Polynesian languages is unclear. Adelaar (2005) assigned them to a larger "Malayo-Sumbawan" subgroup, but this proposal remains controversial.

== Languages ==
Language	Native name	Historical script	Modern script	Number of speakers (in millions)	Native region
Balinese	Basa Bali ᬩᬲᬩᬮᬶ	Balinese script	Latin script (Balinese Latin alphabet)	3.3 (2000)	Bali, Western Lombok, and Eastern Java
Sasak	Base Sasaq ᬪᬵᬲᬵᬲᬓ᭄ᬱᬓ᭄	Sasak script (a modification of the Balinese script)	Latin script (Sasak Latin alphabet)	2.7 (2010)	Lombok
Sumbawa	Basa Samawa ᨅᨕᨔᨕ ᨔᨆᨓ	Lontara script (Satera Jontal variant)	Latin script (Sumbawa Latin alphabet)	0.3 (1989)	Sumbawa
