= Sasak language =

Language spoken in Lombok, Indonesia

Sasak
- Sasaknese
- Base Sasaq ᬪᬵᬲᬵᬲᬓ᭄ᬱᬓ᭄
- Pronunciation: [ˈbasə ˈsasak]
- Native to: Indonesia
- Region: Lombok
- Ethnicity: Sasak; Bayanese
- Native speakers: 2.7 million (2010)
- Language family: Austronesian: Malayo-Polynesian; Malayo-Sumbawan (?); Bali–Sasak–Sumbawa; Sasak–Sumbawa; Sasak
- Early forms: Proto-Austronesian: Proto-Malayo-Polynesian; Proto-Bali–Sasak–Sumbawa; Old Sasak
- Dialects: North Sasak (Kutó-Kuté, Bayan-Sasak) Northeast Sasak (Nggetó-Nggeté) Central Sasak (Menó-Mené) Central East Sasak-Central West Sasak (Ngenó-Ngené) Central South Sasak (Meriaq-Meriku)
- Writing system: Latin script (Sasak Latin alphabet); Sasak script (a modification of the Balinese script)

Official status
- Regulated by: Badan Pengembangan dan Pembinaan Bahasa

Language codes
- ISO 639-2: sas
- ISO 639-3: sas
- Glottolog: sasa1249
- ELP: Sasak
- Sasak language spoken in Lombok and Bali (only spoken by a minority): Sasak is spoken by the majority of the population or as mother language Sasak is spoken by the majority of the population, but also concurrently by a large number of speakers of other languages Sasak is a minority language

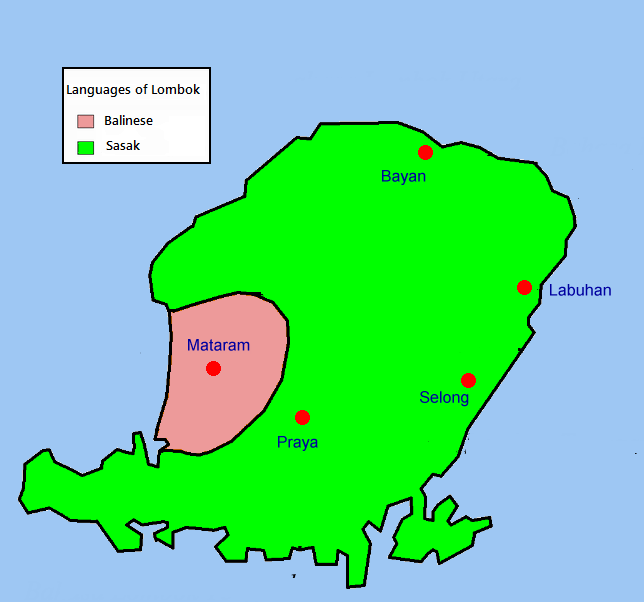
- Linguistic map of Lombok, based on 1981 data. Areas with Sasak speakers are shown in green, and Balinese speakers in red.

The Sasak language (/ˈsɑːsɑːk/ SAH-sahk; Base Sasaq, IPA: [ˈbasə ˈsasak], Sasak script: ᬪᬵᬲᬵᬲᬓ᭄ᬱᬓ᭄; Indonesian: Bahasa Sasak [baˈha.sa ˈsasak]) or Sasaknese is spoken by the Sasak ethnic group, which make up the majority of the population of Lombok, an island in the West Nusa Tenggara province of Indonesia. It is closely related to the Balinese and Sumbawa languages spoken on adjacent islands, and is part of the Austronesian language family. Sasak has no official status; the national language, Indonesian, is the official and literary language in areas where Sasak is spoken.

Some of its dialects, which correspond to regions of Lombok, have a low mutual intelligibility. Sasak has a system of speech levels in which different words are used depending on the social level of the addressee relative to the speaker, similar to neighbouring Javanese and Balinese.

Not widely read or written today, Sasak is used in traditional texts written on dried lontar leaves and read on ceremonial occasions. Traditionally, Sasak's writing system is nearly identical to Balinese script.

== Speakers ==
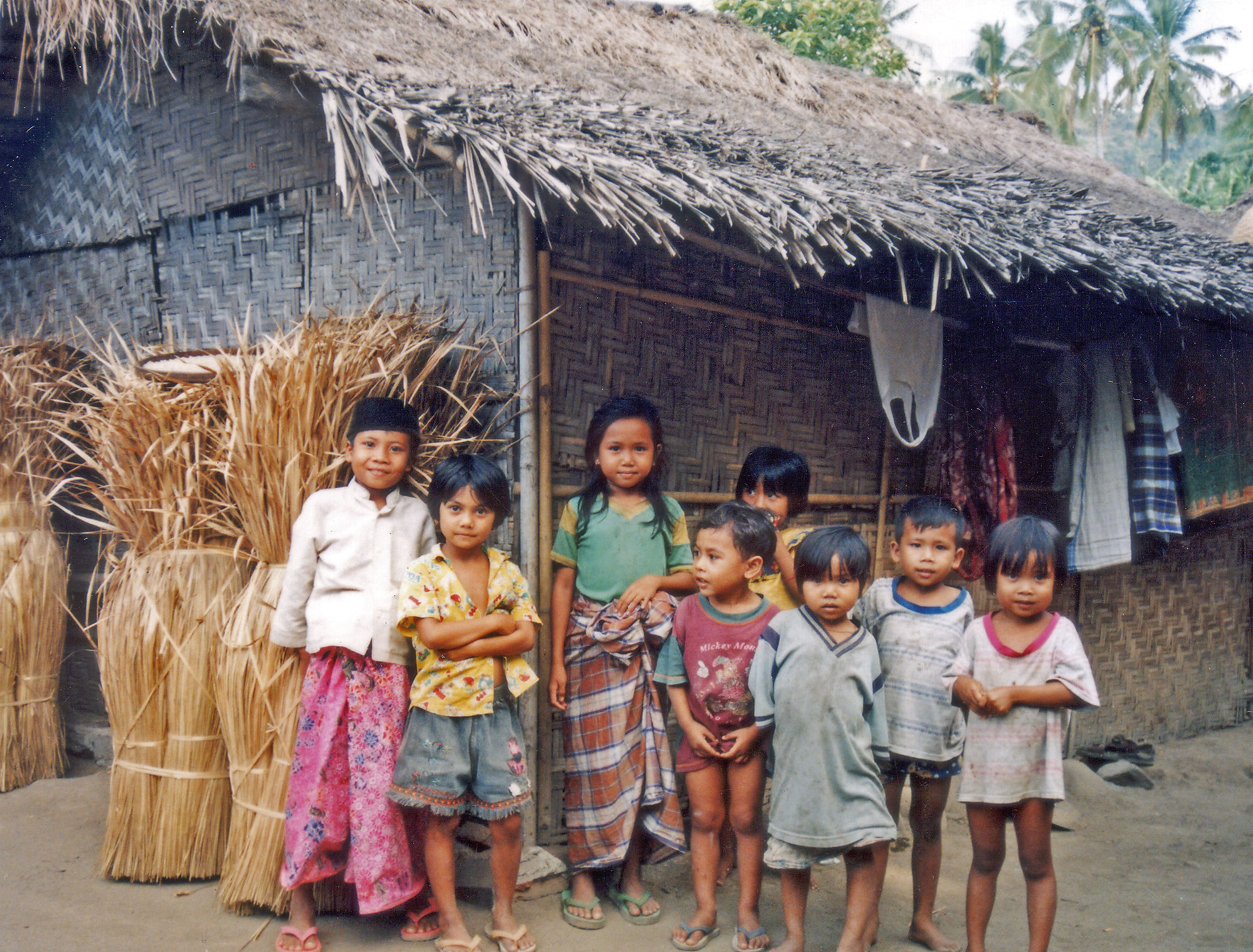
Sasak village on Lombok

Sasak is spoken by the Sasak people on the island of Lombok in West Nusa Tenggara, Indonesia, which is located between the island of Bali (on the west) and Sumbawa (on the east). Its speakers numbered about 2.7 million in 2010, roughly 85 percent of Lombok's population. Sasak is used in families and villages, but has no formal status. The national language, Indonesian, is the language of education, government, literacy and inter-ethnic communication. The Sasak are not the only ethnic group in Lombok; about 300,000 Balinese people live primarily in the western part of the island and near Mataram, the provincial capital of West Nusa Tenggara. In urban areas with more ethnic diversity there is some language shift towards Indonesian, mainly in the forms of code-switching and mixing rather than an abandoning of Sasak.

== Classification and related languages ==
Sasak and related Malayo-Sumbawan languages, according to Adelaar (2005)

Austronesian linguist K. Alexander Adelaar classified Sasak as one of the Malayo-Sumbawan languages group (a group he first identified) of the western Malayo-Polynesian family in a 2005 paper. Sasak's closest sister language is Sumbawa and, with Balinese, they form the Balinese-Sasak-Sumbawa (BSS) subgroup. BSS, Malayic (which includes Malay, Indonesian and Minangkabau) and Chamic (which includes Acehnese) form one branch of the Malayo-Sumbawan group. The two other branches are Sundanese and Madurese. This classification puts Javanese, previously thought to belong to the same group, outside the Malayo-Sumbawan group in a different branch of the western Malayo-Polynesian family.

The Malayo-Sumbawan proposal, however, is rejected by Blust (2010) and Smith (2017), who included the BSS languages in the putative "Western Indonesian" subgroup, alongside Javanese, Madurese, Sundanese, Lampung, Greater Barito and Greater North Borneo languages.

Kawi, a literary language based on Old Javanese, has significantly influenced Sasak. It is used in Sasak puppet theatre, poetry and some lontar-based texts, sometimes mixed with Sasak. Kawi is also used for hyperpoliteness (a speech level above Sasak's "high" level), especially by the upper class known as the mènak.

== Phonology ==
Consonants
		Labial	Alveolar	Palatal	Velar	Glottal
Nasal		m	n	ɲ	ŋ	
Plosive/ Affricate	voiceless	p	t	tɕ	k	ʔ
Plosive/ Affricate	voiced	b	d	dʑ	ɡ	
Fricative			s			h
Rhotic			ɾ~r			
Approximant			l	j	w	

Eight vowels appear in Sasak dialects, contrasting with each other differently by dialect. They are represented in Latin orthography by ⟨a⟩, ⟨e⟩, ⟨i⟩, ⟨o⟩ and ⟨u⟩, with diacritics sometimes used to distinguish conflated sounds. The usual Indonesian practice is to use ⟨e⟩ for the schwa, ⟨é⟩ for the close-mid front vowel, ⟨è⟩ for the open-mid front vowel, ⟨ó⟩ for the close-mid back vowel and ⟨ò⟩ for the open-mid back vowel.

Vowels
	Front	Central	Back
Close	i		u
Close-Mid	e	ə	o
Open-Mid	ɛ	ə	ɔ
Open		a	

=== Diphthongs ===
Sasak has the diphthongs (two vowels combined in the same syllable) /ae/, /ai/, /au/, /ia/, /uə/ and /oe/.

=== Morphophonology ===
Sasak words have a single stress on the final syllable. Final /a/ in Sasak roots change phonetically to a tense [ə] (mid central vowel); for example, /baca/ ('to read') will be realized (and spelled) as bace, but when affixed the vowel stays the same, as in bacaan, 'reading' and pembacaan, 'reading instrument'. In compounding, if the first element ends in a vowel, the element will take a nasal linker (/n/ in most dialects, /ŋ/ in some). For example, compounding mate ('eye') and bulu ('hair') will result in maten bulu ('eyelash').

== Grammar ==
Sasak has a flexible word order, typical of western Indonesian languages. Frequency distributions of the various word orders are influenced by the verb forms in the clause (i.e. whether the clause involves a nasal or an unmarked verb, see #Verbs). Clauses involving the nasal verb form are predominantly subject-verb-object (SVO), similar to actor-focus classes in other western Indonesian languages. In contrast, clauses with an unmarked verb form do not have a dominant word order; three of the six possible orders (subject-verb-object, verb-subject-object and object-verb-subject) occur with roughly-equal frequency.

Verbs, like those of other western Indonesian languages, are not conjugated for tense, mood or aspect. All affixes are derivational. Verbs may appear in two forms: unmarked (also known as basic or oral) and nasal. The basic form appears in vocabulary lists and dictionaries, and the nasal form adds the nasal prefix n-. The nasal prefix, which also appears as nge-, m- and other forms, may delete the first consonant of the basic form. For example, the unmarked form of 'to buy' is beli and the nasal form is mbeli. The nasal prefix can also turn a noun into the corresponding verb; for example, kupi ('coffee') becomes ngupi ('to drink coffee'). The function of the prefix and nasal derivations from the basic form differ by dialect. For example, eastern dialects of Sasak have three types of nasalization: the first marks transitive verbs, the second is used for predicate focus, and the third is for a durative action with a non-specific patient. Imperative and hortative sentences use the basic form.

Sasak has a variety of clitics, a grammatical unit pronounced as part of a word (like an affix) but a separate word syntactically—similar to the English language clitic 'll. Simple clitics occur in a demonstrative specifier attached to a previous noun or noun phrase; for example, ni ('this') in dengan ni ('this person'). Special clitics occur with noun hosts to encode inalienable possession, and with other hosts to encode agents and patients. For example, the possessive clitic ku (or kò or k, depending on dialect)—which means 'my' and corresponds to the pronoun aku ('I')—can attach to the noun ime ('hand') for imengku ('my hand').

== Variations ==
=== Regional ===
Sasak has significant regional variations, including by phonology, vocabulary and grammar. Native speakers recognize five labelled dialects, named for how "like that" and "like this" are pronounced: Kutó-Kuté (predominant in North Sasak), Nggetó-Nggeté (Northeast Sasak), Menó-Mené (Central Sasak), Ngenó-Ngené (Central East Sasak, Central West Sasak) and Meriaq-Meriku (Central South Sasak). However, linguist Peter K. Austin said that the five labels do not "reflect fully the extensive geographical variation ... found within Sasak" in many linguistic areas. Some dialects have a low mutual intelligibility.

=== Speech levels ===
Sasak has a system of speech levels in which different words are used, depending on the social level of the addressee relative to the speaker. The system is similar to that of Balinese and Javanese (languages spoken on neighbouring islands) and Korean. There are three levels in Sasak for the status of the addressee (low, mid- and high), and a humble-honorific dimension which notes the relationship between the speaker and another referent. For example, 'you' may be expressed as kamu (low-level), side (mid-), pelinggih (high) or dekaji (honorific). 'To eat' is mangan (low), bekelór (mid-), madaran (high) or majengan (honorific).

All forms except low are known as alus ('smooth' or 'polite') in Sasak. They are used in formal contexts and with social superiors, especially in situations involving mènak (the traditional upper caste, which makes up eight percent of the population). The system is observed in regional varieties of the language. Although low-level terms have large regional variations, non-low forms are consistent in all varieties. According to Indonesian languages specialist Bernd Nothofer, the system is borrowed from Balinese or Javanese.

== Literature ==
The Sasak have a tradition of writing on dried leaves of the lontar palm. The Javanese Hindu-Buddhist Majapahit empire, whose sphere of influence included Lombok, probably introduced literacy to the island during the fourteenth century. The oldest surviving lontar texts date to the nineteenth century; many were collected by the Dutch and kept in libraries in Leiden or Bali. The Mataram Museum in Lombok also has a collection, and many individuals and families on the island keep them as heirlooms to be passed from generation to generation.

The lontar texts are still read today in performances known as pepaòsan. Readings are made for a number of occasions, including funerals, weddings and circumcision ceremonies. Rural Sasak read the lontar texts as part of a ritual to ensure the fertility of their farm animals. Peter K. Austin described a pepaòsan which was performed as part of a circumcision ceremony in 2002, with paper copies of lontar texts rather than palm leaves.

Lombok's lontar texts are written in Sasak, Kawi (a literary language based on old Javanese) or a combination of the two. They are written in hanacaraka, a script nearly identical to Balinese. Its basic letters consist of a consonant plus the vowel a. The first five letters read ha, na, ca, ra and ka, giving the script its name. Syllables with vowels other than a use the basic letter plus diacritics above, below or around it. Final consonants of a syllable or consonant clusters may also be encoded. This writing system is also named Sasak script.
