= Balinese script =

Brahmic script used in Bali, Indonesia

Balinese script ᬅᬓ᭄ᬱᬭᬩᬮᬶ
- Script type: Abugida
- Period: 914 CE – present
- Direction: Left-to-right
- Languages: Balinese; Old Javanese; Sanskrit; Sasaknese; Malay; Indonesian; Balinese Malay

Related scripts
- Parent systems: Egyptian hieroglyphs: Proto-Sinaitic; Phoenician; Aramaic; Brahmi; Tamil-Brahmi; Pallava; Old Kawi; Balinese script
- Sister systems: Batak; Baybayin scripts Javanese; Lontara; Makasar; Old Sundanese; Rencong; Rejang; Sasak

ISO 15924
- ISO 15924: Bali (360), Balinese

Unicode
- Unicode alias: Balinese
- Unicode range: U+1B00–U+1B7F

Part of a series on

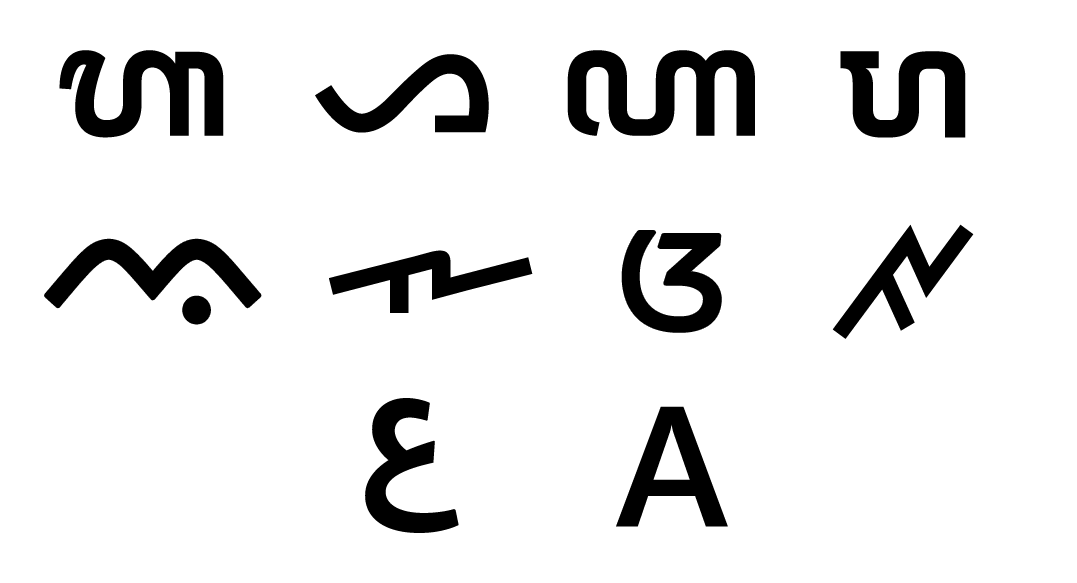

Writing systems used in Indonesia
Abugida (Brahmic)
- Balinese
- Batak
- Buda
- Javanese
- Kawi
- Lontara (Satera Jontal, Mbojo)
- Makasar
- Sasak
- Sundanese (Old Sundanese)
- Ulu (Incung, Komering, Lampung, Lembak,
- Ogan, Pasemah, Rejang, Serawai)
Abjad
- Buri Wolio
- Jawi
- Jawoe
- Pegon
Alphabet
- Latin (Van Ophuijsen, Suwandi, EYD)
Others
- Alifuru
- Bonda
- Cia-Cia
- Bilang-bilang
- Dunging
Related
- List of writing systems of Indonesia
- Languages of Indonesia

The Balinese script, (Balinese: ᬅᬓ᭄ᬱᬭᬩᬮᬶ, Aksara Bali, pronounced [aksarə ˈbali]) also known as hanacaraka (Balinese: ᬳᬦᬘᬭᬓ), is an abugida used in the island of Bali, Indonesia, commonly for writing the Austronesian Balinese language, Old Javanese, Malay and the liturgical language Sanskrit. With some modifications, the script is also used to write the Sasak language, used in the neighboring island of Lombok. In the present day it is also sometimes used to write the national language Indonesian.

The script is a descendant of the Brahmi script, and so has many similarities with the modern scripts of South and Southeast Asia. The Balinese script, along with the Javanese script, is considered the most elaborate and ornate among Brahmic scripts of Southeast Asia.

Though everyday use of the script has largely been supplanted by the Latin alphabet, the Balinese script has a significant prevalence in many of the island's traditional ceremonies and is strongly associated with the Hindu religion. The script is mainly used today for copying lontar or palm leaf manuscripts containing religious texts.

== Earliest record ==
=== Belanjong pillar ===
The Belanjong pillar, also Blanjong pillar or Blanjong inscription (Indonesian: Prasasti Blanjong, Balinese: ᬧ᭄ᬭᬰᬵᬲ᭄ᬢᬶᬩ᭄ᬮᬜ᭄ᬚᭀᬂ), is a pillar established in 914 CE in the harbour of Belanjong, in the southern area of Sanur in Bali. This is the earliest evidence of Balinese literary script and language.

=== Language-script and Date ===
The inscription is written in both the Indian Sanskrit language and Old Balinese language, using two scripts, the Nagari script and the Old Balinese script (which is used to write both Balinese and Sanskrit). The Old Balinese in pre-Nagari script is on one side of the pillar, while the Sanskrit inscription in Pallava-derived old Javanese script (also called Kawi script) is on the other side.

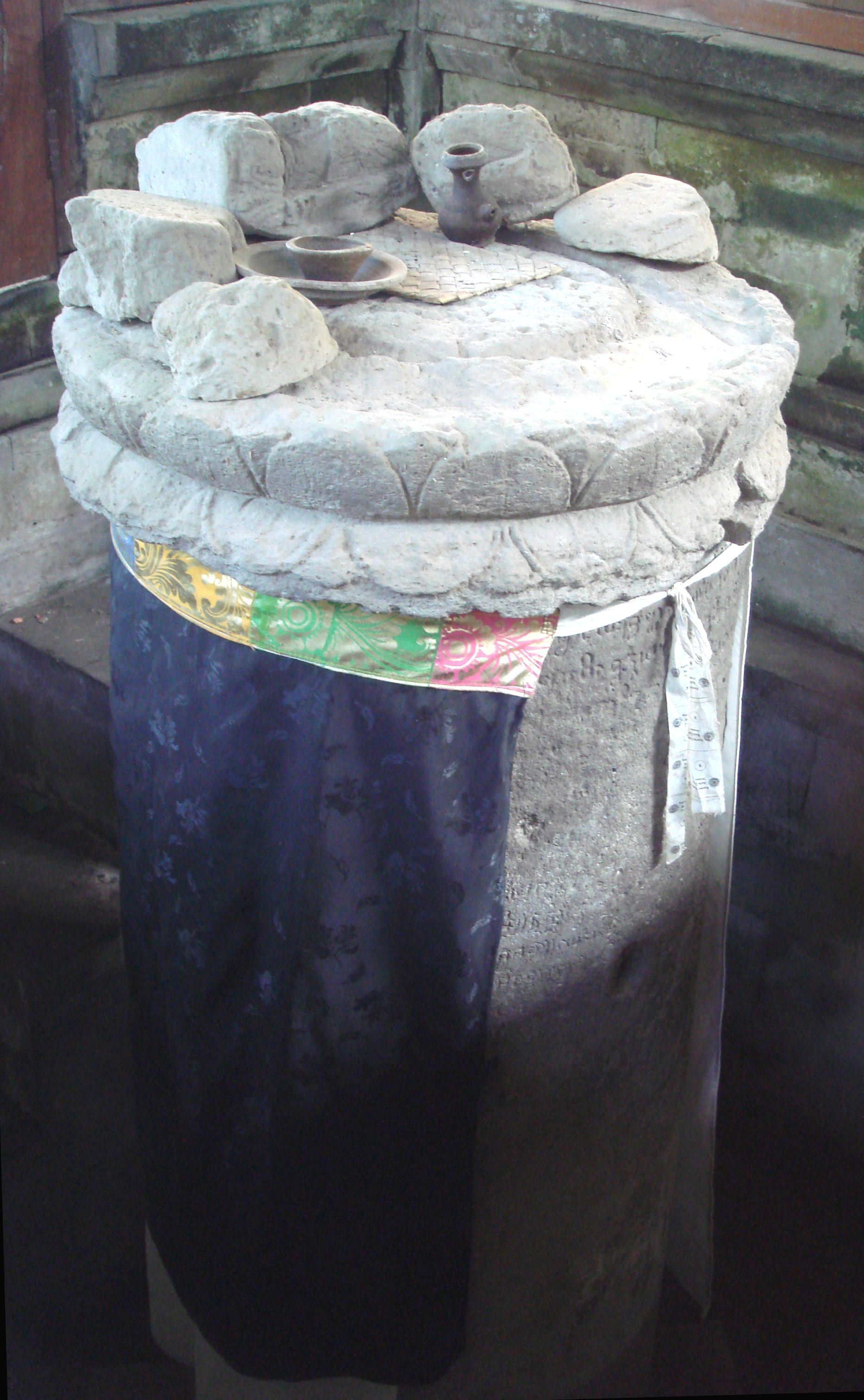
Pillar found in Sanur, and Balinese script found

The pillar is dated according to the Indian Shaka era, on the seventh day of the waxing half ('saptāmyāṁ sita') of the month Phalguna of the Śaka year 835, which corresponds to 4 February 914 CE as calculated by Louis-Charles Damais.

== Characteristics ==
There are 47 letters in the Balinese script, each representing a syllable with inherent vowel /a/ or /ə/ at the end of a sentence, which changes depending on the diacritics around the letter. Pure Balinese can be written with 18 consonant letters and 9 vowel letters, while Sanskrit transliteration or loan words from Sanskrit and Old Javanese utilizes the full set. A set of modified letters are also used for writing the Sasak language. Each consonant has a conjunct form called gantungan which nullifies the inherent vowel of the previous syllable.

Punctuation includes a comma, period, colon, as well as marks to introduce and end section of a text. Musical notation uses letter-like symbols and diacritical marks in order to indicate pitch information. Text are written left to right without word boundaries (Scriptio continua).

There is also a set of "holy letters" called aksara modre which appears in religious texts and protective talismans. Most of them are constructed using diacritic ulu candra with corresponding characters. A number of additional characters, known to be used inline in text (as opposed to decoratively on drawings), remains under study and those characters are expected to be proposed as Balinese extensions in due course.

== Letters ==
A basic letter in Balinese is called aksara (ᬅᬓ᭄ᬱᬭ), and each letter stands for a syllable with inherent vowel /a/.

=== Consonants ===
Consonants are called wianjana (ᬯ᭄ᬬᬜ᭄ᬚᬦ) or aksara wianjana (ᬅᬓ᭄ᬱᬭᬯ᭄ᬬᬜ᭄ᬚᬦ). Balinese script has 33 consonants, of which only 18 called wreṣāstra (ᬯᬺᬱᬵᬲ᭄ᬢ᭄ᬭ) are used for writing basic vocabulary in Balinese language. The other 15, known as sualalita (ᬰ᭄ᬯᬮᬮᬶᬢ), are mainly used for writing Sanskrit and Kawi loanwords in Balinese language. The consonants can be arranged into Sanskrit order and hanacaraka traditional order.

Consonants (aksara wianjana)
	Unvoiced		Voiced		Nasal	Semivowel	Sibilant	Fricative
	Unaspirated	Aspirated	Unaspirated	Aspirated	Nasal	Semivowel	Sibilant	Fricative
Velar	ka ᬓ◌᭄ᬓ IPA: [ka] kya	kha ᬔ◌᭄ᬔ IPA: [kʰa] ka mahaprana	ga ᬕ◌᭄ᬕ IPA: [ɡa] gya	gha ᬖ◌᭄ᬖ IPA: [ɡʱa] ga gora	nga ᬗ◌᭄ᬗ IPA: [ŋa] nga			ha ᬳ◌᭄ᬳ IPA: [ha] (Note: The consonant ha is sometimes not pronounced. For example, Balinese: ᬳᬸᬚᬦ, romanized: hujan, lit. 'rain' is pronounced ujan.)
Palatal	ca ᬘ◌᭄ᬘ IPA: [tʃa] ca murca	cha ᬙ◌᭄ᬙ IPA: [tʃʰa] ca laca	ja ᬚ◌᭄ᬚ IPA: [dʒa] ja kujant	jha ᬛ◌᭄ᬛ IPA: [dʒʱa] ja jera	nya ᬜ◌᭄ᬜ IPA: [ɲa]	ya ᬬ◌᭄ᬬ IPA: [ja]	śa ᬰ◌᭄ᬰ IPA: [ɕa] sa saga	
Retroflex	ṭa ᬝ◌᭄ᬝ IPA: [ʈa] ta latik	ṭha ᬞ◌᭄ᬞ IPA: [ʈʰa] ta latik mahaprana	ḍa ᬟ◌᭄ᬟ IPA: [ɖa] da dadu	ḍha ᬠ◌᭄ᬠ IPA: [ɖʱa] da dadu mahaprana	ṇa ᬡ◌᭄ᬡ IPA: [ɳa] na rambat	ra ᬭ◌᭄ᬭ IPA: [ra]	ṣa ᬱ◌᭄ᬱ IPA: [ʂa]	
Dental	ta ᬢ◌᭄ᬢ IPA: [t̪a]	tha ᬣ◌᭄ᬣ IPA: [t̪ʰa] ta tawa	da ᬤ◌᭄ᬤ IPA: [d̪a]	dha ᬥ◌᭄ᬥ IPA: [d̪ʱa] da lindung	na ᬦ◌᭄ᬦ IPA: [n̪a] na kojong	la ᬮ◌᭄ᬮ IPA: [l̪a]	sa ᬲ◌᭄ᬲ IPA: [sa] (Note: Actually an alveolar consonant, but classified as dental by tradition)	
Labial	pa ᬧ◌᭄ᬧ IPA: [pa]	pha ᬨ◌᭄ᬨ IPA: [pʰa] pa kapal	ba ᬩ◌᭄ᬩ IPA: [ba]	bha ᬪ◌᭄ᬪ IPA: [bʱa] ba kembang	ma ᬫ◌᭄ᬫ IPA: [ma]	wa ᬯ◌᭄ᬯ IPA: [wa]		

==== Hanacaraka traditional order ====
The modern Balinese languages does not make use of the whole inventory of consonants inherited from Sanskrit. The 18 consonants used in Balinese (Balinese: ᬅᬓ᭄ᬱᬭᬯᬺᬱᬵᬲ᭄ᬢ᭄ᬭ, romanized: aksara wreṣāstra) are traditionally arranged following the Javanese hanacaraka sequence, in which 20 letters form a four-line pangram narrating the myth of Aji Saka. The remaining consonants (Balinese: ᬅᬓ᭄ᬱᬭᬰ᭄ᬯᬮᬮᬶᬢ, romanized: aksara sualalita) are used in Sanskrit transcription.

Hana caraka
ha ᬳ	na ᬦ	ca ᬘ	ra ᬭ	ka ᬓ	Javanese: ꦲꦤꦕꦫꦏ, romanized: hana caraka, lit. 'There were (two) emissaries.'
da ᬤ	ta ᬢ	sa ᬲ	wa ᬯ	la ᬮ	Javanese: ꦢꦠꦱꦮꦭ, romanized: data sawala, lit. 'They began to fight.'
pa ᬧ	(dha)	ja ᬚ	ya ᬬ	nya ᬜ	Javanese: ꦥꦝꦗꦪꦚ, romanized: padha jayanya, lit. 'Their valor was equal'
ma ᬫ	ga ᬕ	ba ᬩ	(tha)	nga ᬗ	Javanese: ꦩꦒꦧꦛꦔ, romanized: maga bathanga, lit. 'They both fell dead.'

=== Consonant clusters ===
As in other members of the Brahmic family, consonant clusters are written cursively, by combining a consonant, an appended letter (Balinese: ᬕᬦ᭄ᬢᬸᬗᬦ᭄, romanized: gantungan) or attached letter (ᬕᬾᬫ᭄ᬧᬾᬮᬦ᭄, gempelan). For example, ⟨ᬦ᭄ᬤ⟩, a ⟨ᬦ, na⟩ appended with ⟨◌᭄ᬤ, da⟩ is pronounced [nda]. Each consonant letter has a corresponding gantungan or gempelan.

A consonant may be marked with both a gantungan or gempelan and a vowel diacritic (pangangge), but attaching two or more gantungan to one letter is forbidden. When three consonants occur together, vowel-killer (adeg-adeg) may be used in the middle of a word. For example, in the word ᬢᬫ᭄‌ᬩ᭄ᬮᬂ, temblang, the consonant cluster mbl is spelled ⟨ᬫ + ◌᭄ + ᬩ + ◌᭄ᬮ⟩.

For a few letters, ⟨ᬧ, pa⟩, ⟨ᬨ, pha⟩, ⟨ᬲ, sa⟩ and ⟨ᬰ, ṣa⟩ adding a gantungan or gempelan also eliminates the letter's inherent vowel [a].

== Vowels ==
Vowels, called suara (ᬲ᭄ᬯᬭ) or aksara suara (ᬅᬓ᭄ᬱᬭᬲ᭄ᬯᬭ), can be written as independent letters when vowels appear in initial position.

a kara ᬅ a IPA: [a]	i kara ᬇ i IPA: [i]	ra repa ᬋ ṛ IPA: [ɹ̩]	la lenga ᬍ ḷ IPA: [l̩]	u kara ᬉ u IPA: [u]	e kara ᬏ e IPA: [e], [ɛ]	o kara ᬑ o IPA: [o], [ɔ]
a kara ᬆ ā IPA: [ɑː]	i kara ᬈ ī IPA: [iː]	ra repa ᬌ ṝ IPA: [ɹ̩ː]	la lenga ᬎ ḹ IPA: [l̩ː]	u kara ᬊ ū IPA: [uː]	airsanya ᬐ ai IPA: [aːi]	o kara ᬒ au IPA: [aːu]

== Diacritics ==
Diacritics (Balinese: ᬧᬗ᭢‌ᬗ᭄ᬕ, romanized: pangangge) are symbols that cannot stand by themselves. When they are attached to independent letters, they affect the pronunciation. The three types of diacritics are pangangge suara, pangangge tengenan, and pangangge aksara.

=== Vowel diacritics ===
Vowel diacritics (Balinese: ᬧᬗ᭢‌ᬗ᭄ᬕᬲ᭄ᬯᬭ, romanized: pangangge suara) change the inherent vowel of a consonant letter. For example, the letter ⟨ᬦ, na⟩ plus ⟨◌ᬶ, ulu⟩ becomes ⟨, ni⟩.

Vowel diacritics and examples with ⟨ᬓ⟩.
pepet ◌ᭂ e, ê, ě IPA: [ə] (Note: In the romanization of Balinese, developed during Dutch Colonial Era, the e represents [ə] and é represents the sounds [e] and [ɛ] as they do in the Van Ophuijsen Indonesian. Since 1957, the sounds [ə], [e] and [ɛ] have all been represented by e, as in the modern Malay alphabet, except dictionaries and materials for new learners.)	tedung ◌ᬵ ā IPA: [ɑː]	ulu ◌ᬶ i IPA: [i]	ulu sari ◌ᬷ ī IPA: [iː]	suku ◌ᬸ u IPA: [u]	suku ilut ◌ᬹ ū IPA: [uː]	taling ◌ᬾ e, é IPA: [e] [ɛ]	taling detya ◌ᬿ ai IPA: [aːi]	taling tedung ◌ᭀ o IPA: [o], [ɔ]	taling detya matedun ◌ᭁ au IPA: [aːu]
ᬓᭂ ke, kê, kě	ᬓᬵ kā	ᬓᬶ ki	ᬓᬷ kī	ᬓᬸ ku	ᬓᬹ kū	ᬓᬾ ke, ké	ᬓᬿ kai	ᬓᭀ ko	ᬓᭁ kau

=== Pangangge tengenan ===
Pangangge tengenan (ᬧᬗ᭢‌ᬗ᭄ᬕᬢᭂᬗᭂᬦᬦ᭄), except adeg-adeg, adds a final consonant to a syllable. It can be used together with pangangge suara. For example, the letter ᬦ (na) with bisah (◌ᬄ) becomes ᬦᬄ (nah); ᬓ (ka) with suku (◌ᬸ) and surang (◌ᬃ) becomes ᬓᬸᬃ (kur). Compared to Devanagari, bisah is analogous to visarga, cecek to anusvara, and adeg-adeg to virama.

Adeg-adeg is zero vowel diacritics as in other Brahmic scripts in Balinese script. Adeg-adeg, as virama in Devanagari, suppress the inherent vowel /a/ in the consonant letter. Adeg-adeg is used on impossibility of gantungan and gempelan usage such as succeeded by punctuation marks, attachment of two or more gantungan to one letter (tumpuk telu, lit. three layers), preservation of combination (watek ksatriya, ᬯᬢᭂᬓ᭄‌ᬓ᭄ᬱᬢ᭄ᬭᬶᬬ rather than ᬯᬢᭂᬓ᭄ᬓ᭄ᬱᬢ᭄ᬭᬶᬬ) and disambiguation.

Pangangge tengenan ᬧᬗ᭢‌ᬗ᭄ᬕᬢᭂᬗᭂᬦᬦ᭄
Balinese script	IPA	Translit.	Name
◌ᬄ	[h]	h	Bisah
◌ᬃ	[r]	r	Surang
◌ᬂ	[ŋ]	ng	Cecek
◌᭄	[∅]		Adeg-adeg

=== Pangangge aksara ===
Pangangge aksara (ᬧᬗ᭢‌ᬗ᭄ᬕᬅᬓ᭄ᬱᬭ) is appended below consonant letters. Pangangge aksara are the appended (gantungan) forms of the ardhasuara (semivowel) consonants. Guwung macelek is the appended form of the vowel ra repa (ᬋ).

Pangangge aksara ᬧᬗ᭢‌ᬗ᭄ᬕᬅᬓ᭄ᬱᬭ
Balinese script	IPA	Translit.	Name
◌᭄ᬭ	[ra]	ra	Cakra; Guwung
◌ᬺ	[rə]	rě	Guwung macelek
◌᭄ᬯ	[ʋa]	ua	Suku kembung
◌᭄ᬬ	[ja]	ia	Nania

== Numerals ==
Balinese numerals are written in the same manner as Arabic numerals. For example, 25 is written with the Balinese numbers 2 and 5.

0 ᭐ bindu, windu	1 ᭑ siki, besik	2 ᭒ kalih, dua	3 ᭓ tiki, telu	4 ᭔ papat	5 ᭕ lima	6 ᭖ nem	7 ᭗ pitu	8 ᭘ kutus	9 ᭙ sanga, sia

If the number is written in the middle of a text, carik has to be written before and after the number to differentiate it from the text. Below is an example of how a date is written using Balinese numerals (date: 1 July 1982, location: Bali):

Balinese script	Transliteration
Bali, 1 Juli 1982. ᬩᬮᬶ᭞᭑᭞ᬚᬸᬮᬶ᭞᭑᭙᭘᭒᭟	Bali, 1 Juli 1982.

== Other symbols ==
There are some special symbols in the Balinese script. Some of them are punctuation marks, and the others are religious symbols. The symbols are described in the following list:

Symbol	Symbol	Name	Remarks
	᭞	Carik; Carik Siki	Written in the middle of a sentence, like a comma (,). Also, written surrounding numerals to differentiate them from the text.
	᭟	Carik Kalih; Carik Pareren	Written at the end of a sentence, like a full stop (.).
	᭝	Carik pamungkah	Functions like a colon (:).
	᭟᭜᭟	Pasalinan	Used at the end of a prose, letter, or verse.
	᭚	Panten or Panti	Used at the beginning of a prose, letter, or verse.
	᭛	Pamada	Used at the beginning of religious texts. This symbol is a ligature of the letters ma, nga, ja, and pa, forming the word mangajapa, which roughly means "praying for safety".
	ᬒᬁ	Ongkara	Sacred symbol of Hinduism. This symbol is pronounced "Ong" or "Om".

== Orthography ==
=== Balinese language ===
==== Loanword from Sanskrit and Old Javanese ====
Balinese have many loanwords from Sanskrit and Old Javanese. In general, the Balinese orthography in Balinese script preserve the original orthography. The preservation of original orthography result on several rules:

1. assimilation rule, which based on articulation rule (Kalvi / Shiksha),
2. ᬧᬲᬂᬧᬕᭂᬄ (pasang pageh) rule, which the word is spelled based on the source,
3. ᬫᬤ᭄ᬯᬶᬢ (maduita) rule, which several words has doubled consonant.

==== Assimilation ====
Assimilation in Balinese occurs within the conjuncts/consonant clusters. Balinese script represents assimilation occurred, however Latin script sometimes may not represent this. In general, alveolar consonants are assimilated into palatal, retroflex or labial. There are more specific descriptions in assimilation combination:

- ᬦ [n] assimilated into ᬜ [ɲ] if succeeded by palatal consonants, such as consonant cluster nc ᬜ᭄ᬘ and nj ᬜ᭄ᬚ. For example, word wianjana is written as ᬯ᭄ᬬᬜ᭄ᬚᬦ ([wjaɲdʒana]), not written as ᬯ᭄ᬬᬦ᭄ᬚᬦ (*[wjandʒana]).
- ᬲ [s] assimilated into ᬰ [ɕ] if succeeded by palatal consonants, such as consonant cluster sc ᬰ᭄ᬘ. For example, word pascad is written as ᬧᬰ᭄ᬘᬤ᭄ ([paɕcad]), not written as ᬧᬲ᭄ᬘᬤ᭄ (*[pascad]).
- ᬤ [d] assimilated into ᬚ [dʒ] if succeeded by palatal consonants, such as consonant cluster dny ᬚ᭄ᬜ. For example, word yadnya is written as ᬬᬚ᭄ᬜ ([jadʒɲa]), not written as ᬬᬤ᭄ᬜ (*[jadɲa]).
- ᬦ [n] assimilated into ᬡ [ɳ] if preceded by retroflex consonants, such as consonant cluster rn ᬭ᭄ᬡ. For example, word karna is written as ᬓᬭ᭄ᬡ ([karɳa]), not written as ᬓᬭ᭄ᬦ (*[karna]).
- ᬲ [s] assimilated into ᬱ [ʂ] if succeeded by retroflex consonants, such as consonant cluster st (ṣṭ) ᬱ᭄ᬝ and sn (ṣṇ) ᬱ᭄ᬡ. For example, word dusta (duṣṭa, lie) is written as ᬤᬸᬱ᭄ᬝ ([duʂʈa]), not written as ᬤᬸᬲ᭄ᬝ (*[dusʈa]).
- ᬦ [n] assimilated into ᬫ [m] if succeeded by labial consonants. For example, word tanbara is written as ᬢᬫ᭄ᬪᬭ ([tambʰara]), not written as ᬢᬦ᭄ᬪᬭ (*[tanbʰara]).

==== Liquid Consonant-Schwa Combination ====
Liquid consonant, ᬭ [r] and ᬮ [l], may not be combined with ◌ᭂ (pepet, schwa) [ə] as ᬭᭂ and ᬮᭂ. These combination, rě [rə] and lě [lə], should be written as ᬋ (re repa) and ᬍ (le lenga). Word kěrěng (lit. eat a lot) and lekad are written as ᬓᭂᬋᬂ and ᬍᬓᬤ᭄. While combination of ◌᭄ᬮ (gantungan [l]) and ◌ᭂ (pepet) is possible as in ᬩᬼᬕᬜ᭄ᬚᬸᬃ (bleganjur), combination of ◌᭄ᬭ (cakra or gantungan [r]) and ◌ᭂ pepet is not allowed. If the combination follows a word which ends in a consonant, ◌᭄ᬋ (gempelan re repa) may be used as in ᬧᬓ᭄ᬋᬋᬄ (Pak Rěrěh, Mr. Rěrěh). If the combination is in a word, ◌ᬺ (guwung macelek) may be used instead as in ᬓᬺᬱ᭄ᬡ (Krěsna, Krishna).

==== Latin Script Transliteration ====
Latin script transliteration into Balinese script is based on phonetics. As vocabulary expands, foreign sounds are introduced and have no equivalent on Balinese script. In general, transliteration of foreign sounds is shown as below.

Foreign Sound Transliteration
Sound	Balinese letter	Example	Balinese Script
[f]	ᬧ	telephone	ᬢᬾᬮᬾᬧᭀᬦ᭄, telepon
[v]	ᬧ	vitamin	ᬧᬶᬢᬫᬶᬦ᭄, pitamin
[z]	ᬚ		
[z]	ᬲ	ijaza	ᬳᬶᬚᬲᬄ, ijasah

=== Sasak language ===
The Sasak language, spoken in Lombok Island east of Bali, is related to Balinese, is written in a version of the Balinese script known as Aksara Sasak, which is influenced by the Javanese script and is given additional characters for loanwords of foreign origin.

Sasak letter	Name	IPA	Derived from	Javanese equivalent	Arabic equivalent
ᭅ	qaf	[q~k~ʔ]	ᬓ	ꦐ	ق
ᭆ	xot	[x]	ᬓ+ᬳ	ꦏ꦳	خ
ᭇ	tsir	[ts]	ᬢ	?	ث
ᭈ	ef	[f]	ᬧ	ꦥ꦳	ف
ᭉ	ve	[v]	ᬯ	ꦮ꦳	ۏ
ᭊ	zal	[z]	ᬲ	ꦗ꦳	ز
ᭋ	asyura	[ʃ]	ᬲ+ᬬ	ꦱ꦳	ش

== Fonts ==
There are some fonts for Balinese script as of 2016. Bali Simbar, Bali Galang, JG Aksara Bali, Aksara Bali, Tantular Bali, Lilitan, Geguratan and Noto Sans Balinese are some fonts that included Balinese script. The fonts have different degree of compatibility each other, and most contain critical flaws.

Bali Simbar is first font for Balinese script by I Made Suatjana Dipl Ing at 1999. Bali Simbar is not compatible for MacOS and Unicode. JG Aksara Bali, was designed by Jason Glavy, has over 1400 Balinese glyphs, including a huge selection of precomposed glyph clusters. The latest version of JG Aksara Bali was released on 2003, thus has no compatibility with Unicode. Bali Simbar and JG Aksara Bali, in particular, may cause conflicts with other writing systems, as the font uses code points from other writing systems to complement Balinese's extensive repertoire as Balinese script was not included in Unicode at the creation time.

Aksara Bali by Khoi Nguyen Viet is the first hacked Unicode Balinese font with a brute-force OpenType implementation. The results depend on how well other OpenType features are implemented in the renderer. The font has about 370 Balinese glyphs, but does not display the vowel ⟨é⟩ correctly. The team of Aditya Bayu Perdana, Ida Bagus Komang Sudarma, and Arif Budiarto has created a small series of Balinese fonts: Tantular Bali, Lilitan, and Geguratan, all using hacked Unicode and a brute-force OpenType implementation. Tantular has about 400 Balinese glyphs. These all have serious flaws.

Another Unicode font is Noto Sans Balinese from Google. However, Noto Sans Balinese exhibits several critical flaws, such as an inability to correctly display more than one diacritic per consonant.

The free font Bali Galang, maintained by Bemby Bantara Narendra, displays correctly apart from the consonant-spanning vowels ⟨o⟩ and ⟨au⟩. However, those vowels can be manually substituted by their graphic components, ⟨é⟩ and ⟨ai⟩ followed by the length sign (tedung), which together display as ⟨o⟩ and ⟨au⟩. It also automatically assimilates some consonants within words. It displays corresponding Balinese glyphs instead of Latin letters.

== Unicode ==
Balinese script was added to the Unicode Standard in July, 2006 with the release of version 5.0.

The Unicode block for Balinese is U+1B00–U+1B7F:

Balinese^{[1]}^{[2]} Official Unicode Consortium code chart (PDF)
	0	1	2	3	4	5	6	7	8	9	A	B	C	D	E	F
U+1B0x	ᬀ	ᬁ	ᬂ	ᬃ	ᬄ	ᬅ	ᬆ	ᬇ	ᬈ	ᬉ	ᬊ	ᬋ	ᬌ	ᬍ	ᬎ	ᬏ
U+1B1x	ᬐ	ᬑ	ᬒ	ᬓ	ᬔ	ᬕ	ᬖ	ᬗ	ᬘ	ᬙ	ᬚ	ᬛ	ᬜ	ᬝ	ᬞ	ᬟ
U+1B2x	ᬠ	ᬡ	ᬢ	ᬣ	ᬤ	ᬥ	ᬦ	ᬧ	ᬨ	ᬩ	ᬪ	ᬫ	ᬬ	ᬭ	ᬮ	ᬯ
U+1B3x	ᬰ	ᬱ	ᬲ	ᬳ	᬴	ᬵ	ᬶ	ᬷ	ᬸ	ᬹ	ᬺ	ᬻ	ᬼ	ᬽ	ᬾ	ᬿ
U+1B4x	ᭀ	ᭁ	ᭂ	ᭃ	᭄	ᭅ	ᭆ	ᭇ	ᭈ	ᭉ	ᭊ	ᭋ	ᭌ		᭎	᭏
U+1B5x	᭐	᭑	᭒	᭓	᭔	᭕	᭖	᭗	᭘	᭙	᭚	᭛	᭜	᭝	᭞	᭟
U+1B6x	᭠	᭡	᭢	᭣	᭤	᭥	᭦	᭧	᭨	᭩	᭪	᭫	᭬	᭭	᭮	᭯
U+1B7x	᭰	᭱	᭲	᭳	᭴	᭵	᭶	᭷	᭸	᭹	᭺	᭻	᭼	᭽	᭾	᭿
Notes 1.As of Unicode version 18.0 2.Grey area indicates non-assigned code point

== Sample text ==
=== Article 1 of the Universal Declaration of Human Rights ===
Balinese script

ᬲᬫᬶᬫᬦᬸᬲᬦᬾᬲᬦᬾᬜ᭄ᬭᬸᬯᬤᬶᬯᬦ᭄ᬢᬄᬫᬭ᭄ᬤᬾᬓᬢᬸᬃᬫᬤᬸᬯᬾᬓᬳᬸᬢ᭄ᬢᬫᬳᬦ᭄ᬮᬦ᭄ᬳᬓ᭄ᬳᬓ᭄ᬲᬦᬾᬧᬢᭂᬄ᭟ᬲᬫᬶᬓᬮᬸᬕ᭄ᬭᬵᬳᬶᬦ᭄ᬧᬧᬶᬦᭂᬄᬮᬦ᭄ᬳᬶᬤᭂᬧ᭄ᬢᬸᬃᬫᬗ᭄ᬤᬦᬾᬧᬟᬫᬲᬯᬶᬢ᭄ᬭᬫᭂᬮᬭᬧᬦ᭄ᬲᭂᬫᬗᬢ᭄ᬧᬓᬸᬮᬯᬭ᭄ᬕᬳᬦ᭄᭞

Romanised

Sami manusané sané nyruwadi wantah mardéka tur maduwé kautamaan lan hak-hak sané pateh. Sami kalugrähin papineh lan idep tur mangdané paḍa masawitra melarapan semangat pakulawargaan.

IPA

/ˈsami manʊˈsane ˈsane ɲruˈwadi ˈwantaʰ mərˈdɛka tur maˈduwe kawtaˈmaan lan hakˈhak ˈsane ˈpatəh/ /ˈsami kaluˈgrahin paˈpineh lan iˈdəp tur maŋˈdane ˈpadə masaˈwitrə məlaˈrapan səmaˈŋat pakulawraˈgaan/

English

All human beings are born free and equal in dignity and rights. They are endowed with reason and conscience and should act towards one another in a spirit of brotherhood.

== Gallery ==
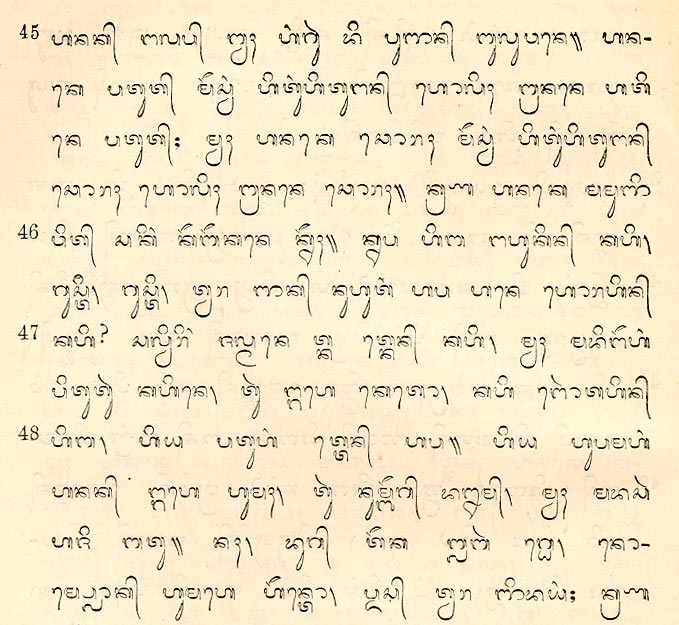
Page from a Bible printed with Balinese script

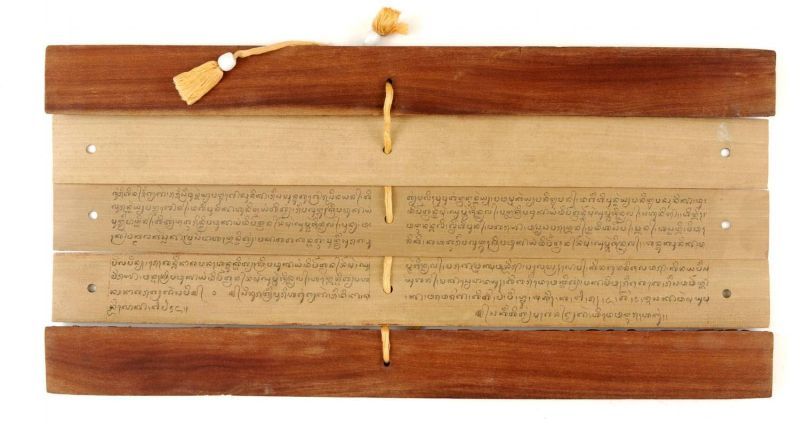
Balinese palm-leaf manuscript

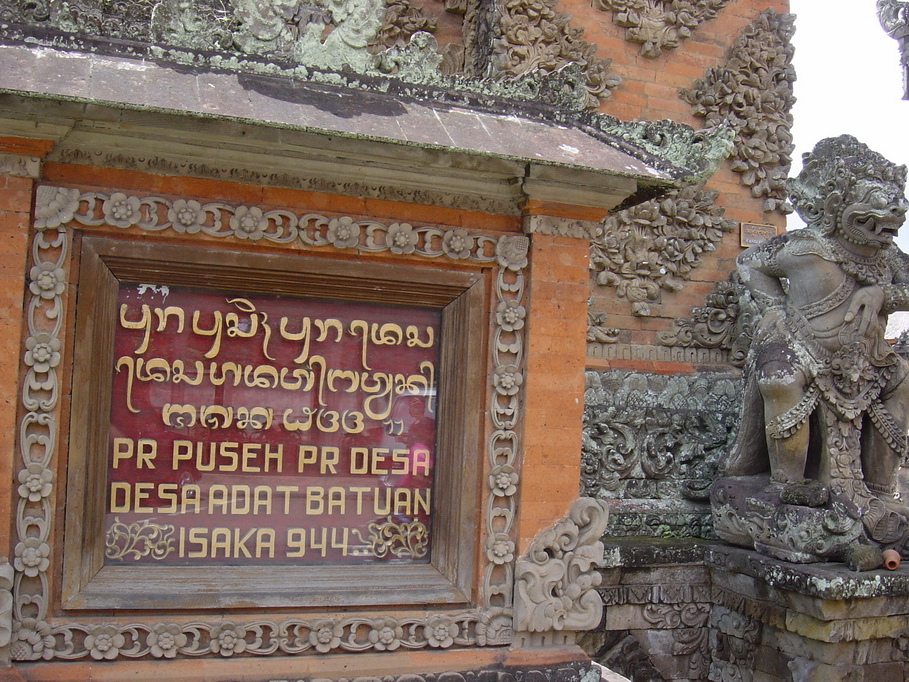
Sign at Pura Puseh Temple, Batuan, Bali

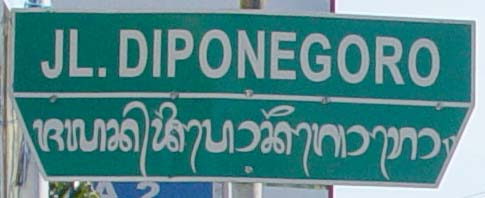
Street sign in Singaraja, written in Latin and Balinese script

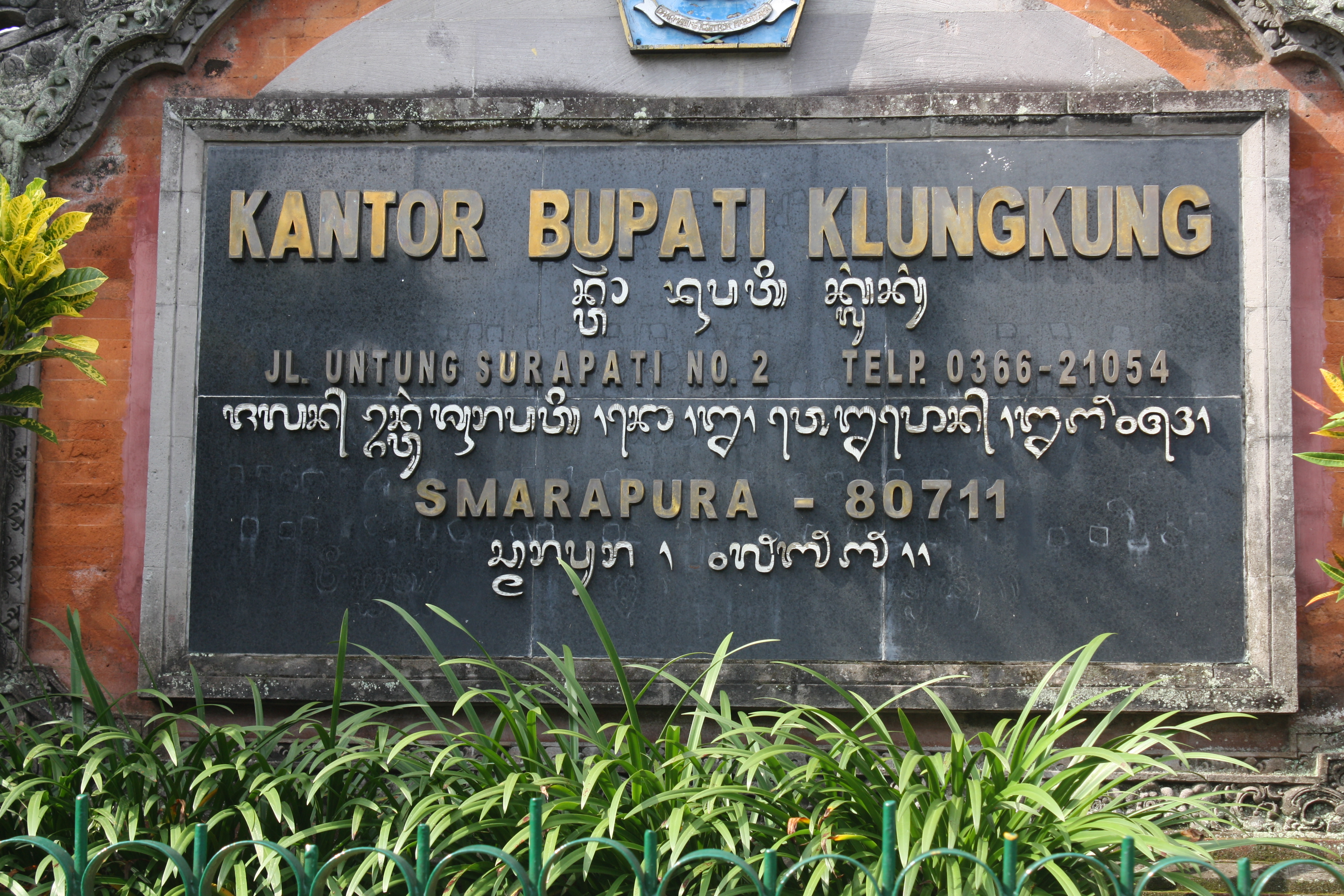
Klungkung Regent's Office sign

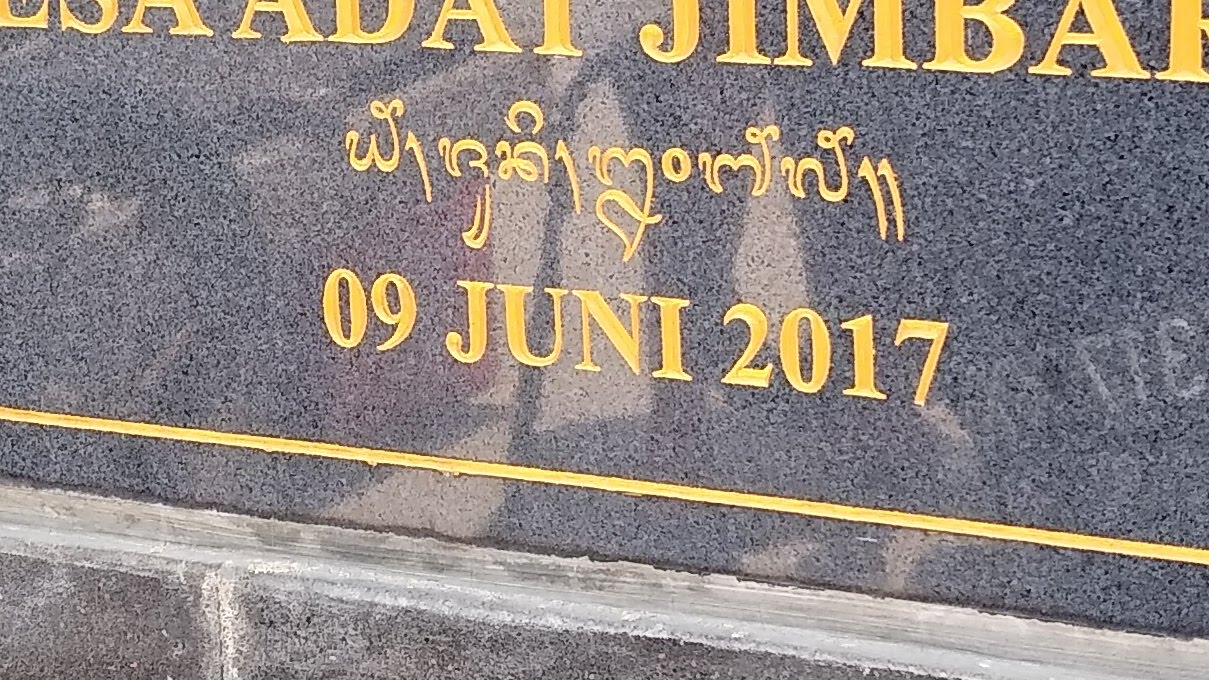
A date in Latin and Balinese script

== See also ==
- Balinese (Unicode block)
- Hanacaraka
- Javanese script
- Kawi script
- Abugida
- Brahmic script
- BASABali
