= Sumbawa language =

Austronesian language spoken in Indonesia

Sumbawa
- Sumbawan
- Basa Samawa ᨅᨔ ᨔᨆᨓ
- Pronunciation: [basa saˈma.wa]
- Native to: Indonesia
- Region: Western Sumbawa; Moyo Island
- Ethnicity: Sumbawa people
- Native speakers: (300,000 cited 1989)
- Language family: Austronesian: Malayo-Polynesian; Malayo-Sumbawan (?); Bali–Sasak-Sumbawa; Sasak–Sumbawa; Sumbawa
- Early forms: Proto-Austronesian: Proto-Malayo-Polynesian; Proto-Bali–Sasak–Sumbawa; Old Sumbawa
- Dialects: Sumbawan dialects
- Writing system: Latin (Sumbawa Latin alphabet); Lontara script (Satera Jontal variant)

Official status
- Regulated by: Badan Pengembangan dan Pembinaan Bahasa

Language codes
- ISO 639-3: smw
- Glottolog: sumb1241
- Sumbawa language is spoken in Sumbawa and Lombok (only spoken by a minority): Sumbawa is spoken by the majority of the population or as their mother language Sumbawa is spoken by the majority of the population, but also concurrently by a large number of speakers of other languages Sumbawa is a minority language

Sumbawa (/suːmˈbɑːwə/ soom-BAH-wə; Basa Samawa, Satera Jontal script: ᨅᨔ ᨔᨆᨓ, IPA: [basa saˈma.wa]; Indonesian: Bahasa Sumbawa [baˈha.sa sʊmˈbawa]) or Sumbawan is a Malayo-Polynesian language of the western half of Sumbawa Island, Indonesia, which it shares with speakers of Bima. It is closely related to the languages of adjacent Lombok and Bali; indeed, it is the easternmost Austronesian language in the south of Indonesia that is not part of the Central Malayo-Polynesian Sprachbund. The Sumbawa write their language with their own native script commonly known in their homeland as Satera Jontal and they also use the Latin script.

== Phonology ==
=== Consonants ===
		Labial	Dental/ Alveolar	Palatal	Velar	Glottal
Plosive/ Affricate	voiceless	p	t̪	t͡ʃ	k	ʔ
Plosive/ Affricate	voiced	b	d	d͡ʒ	g	
Fricative		f	s			h
Nasal		m	n	ɲ	ŋ	
Trill			r			
Lateral			l			
Approximant		w		j		

=== Vowels ===
	Front	Central	Back
Close	i		u
Close-mid	e	ə	o
Open-mid	ɛ	ə	ɔ
Open		a	

/i, u/ can also have allophones of [ɪ, ʊ].

== Language groups and dialects ==
Linguistically, the Sumbawa language is closely related to the Sasak and Balinese languages. Both languages are part of the Bali-Sasak-Sumbawa language group, which is included in the "Northern and Eastern" group of Malay-Sumbawa languages.

In the Sumbawa language, several regional dialects or language variations are known based on the area where they are spread, including the Samawa dialect, Baturotok or Batulanteh, and other dialects used in the Ropang mountain area such as Labangka, Lawen, as well as the population in the south of Lunyuk, besides the Taliwang dialect, Jereweh, and the Tongo dialect. Within these regional dialects, there are still a number of regional dialect variations used by certain communities, which indicate that the Sumbawa tribe consists of various ethnic ancestors, for example, the Taliwang dialect spoken by speakers in Labuhan Lalar who are descendants of the Bajau ethnic group is different from the Taliwang dialect spoken by the community in Sampir Village who are descendants of the Mandar, Bugis, and Makassar.

Social interactionl carried out by Sumbawa community groups demands the presence of a language that is able to bridge all their interests. Consequently, relatively more advanced social groups tend to influence those in lower strata. Thus, language flows and spreads in line with their cultural development. The Samawa dialect, or Sumbawa Besar dialect, whose origins are derived from the Seran dialect, has been studied by all social groups since the reign of the Muslim kings of the Sumbawa Sultanate to the present day as a bridge of communication. The Samawa dialect automatically occupies a position as the standard dialect within the Sumbawa language, meaning it is a social or regional variation of a language that has been accepted as the standard language and represents other regional dialects within the Sumbawa language.

As the dominant language used by social groups in Sumbawa, Samawa is not only accepted as a unifying language among the ethnic groups of the former Sumbawa Sultanate but also serves as a medium for facilitating regional culture, supported by the majority of its speakers and used as the everyday language of the political, social, and economic elite. As a result, the Samawa language developed by getting loan words from the ethnic languages of its speakers, namely the Javanese, Madurese, Balinese, Sasak, Bima, Sulawesi (Bugis, Makassar, Mandar), Sumatra (Padang and Palembang), Kalimantan (Banjarmasin), China (Tolkin and Tartar) and Arabic. Even during the colonial period, the Samawa language also absorbed foreign vocabulary originating from Portuguese, Dutch, and Japanese. Samawa language has now been accepted as a language that shows a relatively high level of stability in the discussion of regional languages.

== Relatedness ==
English	Bima language	Sumbawa Language
Eyes	Mada	Mata
People	Dou	Tau

English	Banjar language	Sumbawa Language
Raft	Lanting	Lanting
Near	Parak	Parak
Name of a type of food	Pundut	Pundut

English	Balinese language	Sumbawa Language
Title of King	Dewa Agung	Dewa Masmawa
When	Pidan	Pidan

English	Makassar language	Sumbawa language
The title of the King's son	Daeng	Daeng

English	Arabic Morocco	Sumbawa language
Maulana	Mawla/Moulay	Mele
Noblewoman	Lalla	La la
