= Charak =

Charak may refer to:

- Charaka (lit. 'wanderer'), an ancient Indian physician
  - Charaka Samhita, the foundational text of the Indian medical system of Ayurveda written by Charaka
  - Charaka shapath or Charaka oath, a set of instructions for students of medicine, the well-being of the patient etc. (cf. Hippocratic Oath)
- Caraka-Katha, a school of the Black Yajurveda in Hinduism, founded by the Carakas (wanderers)
- Charak Palika Hospital, a hospital in New Delhi, India
- Charak Puja, a folk festival of Bengal, last day of the festival of Gajan dedicated to Shiva
- Charak, Yarkant County, Yarkant County, Kashgar Prefecture, Xinjiang
- Bandar Charak, a city in Iran
- Charak, Bushehr, a village in Iran

== See also ==
- Carakan (disambiguation)
