= Hanacaraka =

Hanacaraka is the native name for the following indigenous scripts used in Indonesia:

- The Balinese script
- The Javanese script
- The Sundanese script

== See also ==
- Carakan
