= Simanjuntak =

Batak surname originating in Indonesia

Simanjuntak is one of Toba Batak clans originating in North Sumatra, Indonesia. People of this clan bear the clan's name as their surname. Notable people of this clan include:

- Daniel Simanjuntak, Indonesian diplomat
- Harry Truman Simanjuntak (born 1951), Indonesian archaeologist and prehistorian
- Jintar Simanjuntak (born 1987), Indonesian karateka
- Marsillam Simanjuntak (born 1943), Indonesian politician
- Maruli Simanjuntak (born 1970), Indonesian military general
- Parlagutan Simanjuntak (born 1967), Indonesian politician
- P. W. T. Simanjuntak (1935-2021), Indonesian Lutheran minister
- Riko Simanjuntak (born 1992), Indonesian professional footballer
- Samuel Simanjuntak (born 1999), Indonesian professional footballer
