= Carakan =

Carakan may refer to:

- Çərəkən, Azerbaijan
- Javanese script
- An ECMAScript engine developed by Opera Software

== See also ==
- Hanacaraka
