= Sasak script =

Abugida used for the Sasak language on the Island of Lombok

Sasak script Aksara Sasaq
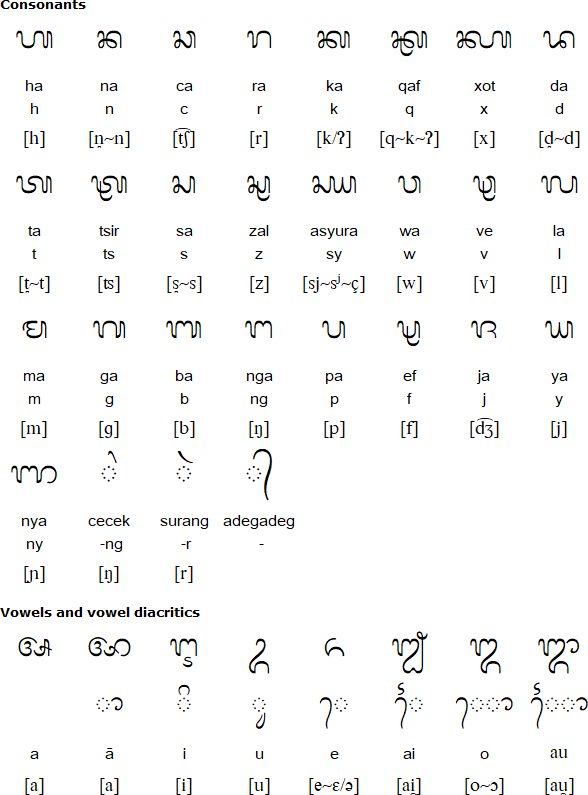
- Script type: Abugida
- Languages: Sasak

Related scripts
- Parent systems: According to the hypothesis of the relationship between the Aramaic and Brahmi alphabets, their genealogy is as follows: Proto-Sinaitic alphabet; Phoenician alphabet; Aramaic alphabet; Brahmi script; From Brahmi are derived: Pallava script; Kawi script; Balinese script; Sasak script
- Sister systems: Balinese; Batak; Baybayin; Lontara; Incung; Javanese; Lampung; Makassar; Sundanese; Ulu

The Sasak script, locally known as Aksara Sasaq and Jejawaan Sasaq, is an abugida traditionally used to write the Sasak language in the island of Lombok. It descends from the Kawi script and is heavily influenced by the Balinese and Javanese scripts.

== History ==
According to one hypothesis, the Sasak people have inhabited island of Lombok for centuries, they are said to have inhabited the areas since 4,000 BC. There is an opinion that says that the Sasak people originate from a mixture of the native people of Lombok with immigrants from Java, then there are also those who state that the ancestors of the Sasak people were Javanese.

According to Goris, "Sasak" etymologically comes from the words sah meaning 'to go' and shaka meaning 'ancestor'. Thus he concluded that Sasak means 'going to ancestral land'. From this understanding it is suspected that the ancestors of the Sasak people were Javanese. Other evidence refers to the Sasak script used by the Sasak people, known as the Jejawaan Sasak script, which is a writing system originating from the island of Java. In its development, this script was well presented by Sasak poets who gave birth to the tradition of Sasak literature.

Based on the origins and use of manuscripts in lontar manuscripts, both in Sasak language and Kawi language, Jejawan Sasak script is divided into four groups, namely:

- Baluq Olas
- Rekan
- Swara
- Swalalita

The origin of the Sasak script is from the Javanese script. In terms of pronunciation, there are 20 Javanese letters in the following order; [ha], [na], [ca], [ra], [ka], [da], [ta], [sa], [wa], [la], [pa], [dha], [ja], [ya], [nya], [ma], [ga], [ba], [tha], and [nga]. The letters that were absorbed into the Jejawaan Sasak script only number 18 letters and are called the Baluq Olas script which in English means 'eighteen letters'.

The Sasak language was originally written with a script called the Sasak script, similar to the Balinese script which was influenced by the Javanese script. The script was written on palm leaves, and then from the 1970s, paper began to be used to write the Sasak script. Today knowledge of the Sasak script is limited to a small number of people, and the Latin alphabet is used instead. In 1948, parts of the Bible were translated into Sasak and there was some literature in Sasak in the 19th century that was heavily influenced by Javanese.

== Script types ==
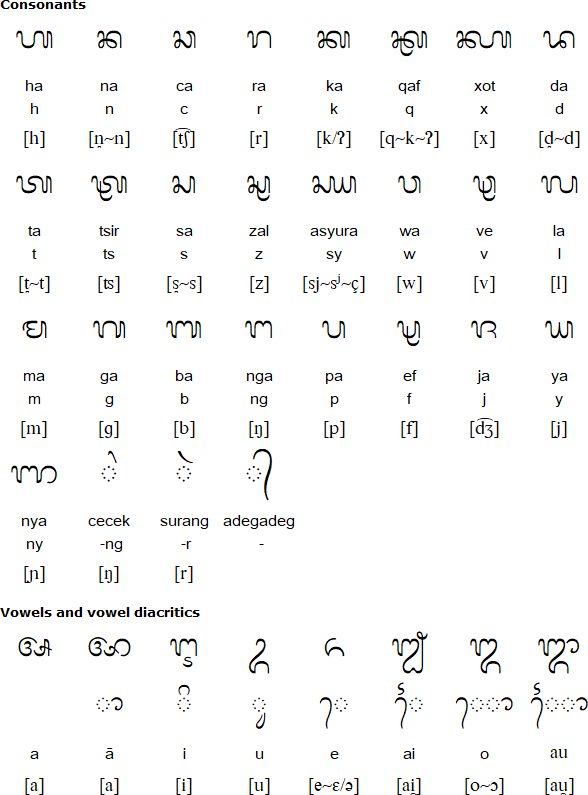
Consonants in the Sasak script.

=== Swalalita ===
Swalalita is a type of script used for writing Sasak palm-leaf manuscripts, both in Sasak and Kawi. Swalalita consists of vowels (swara) and consonants (wyanjana).

=== Swara ===
Swara is used when it comes before and expresses proper names, place names, days of the week, and so on. Swara also functions as a 'murdha' script, which when translated into Latin letters becomes a capital letter, except [le].

The swara script has the vowels [i], [u], [e], [o], and [é]. If it is attached to the wyanjana script, the swara script changes to sandarangan, namely sounds with certain shapes and their placement is above, below, in front, or behind.

=== Wyanjana ===
Wyanjana consists of the letters [h], [r], and [ng] at the end of a syllable, turning into a "sandangan", namely a sound and functions to set off the syllable. Meanwhile, [ra], and [re] are used to enliven the syllables.

=== Baluq olas ===
Carakan or baluq olas outwardly contains the vowel sound [a], and is one syllable. If it does not contain the vowel sounds [a], [h], [n], [c], and so on, not [ha], [na], [ca], and so on, then it is called a "legena" character.
