= Komering script =

Traditional script from South Sumatra and used to write Komering language

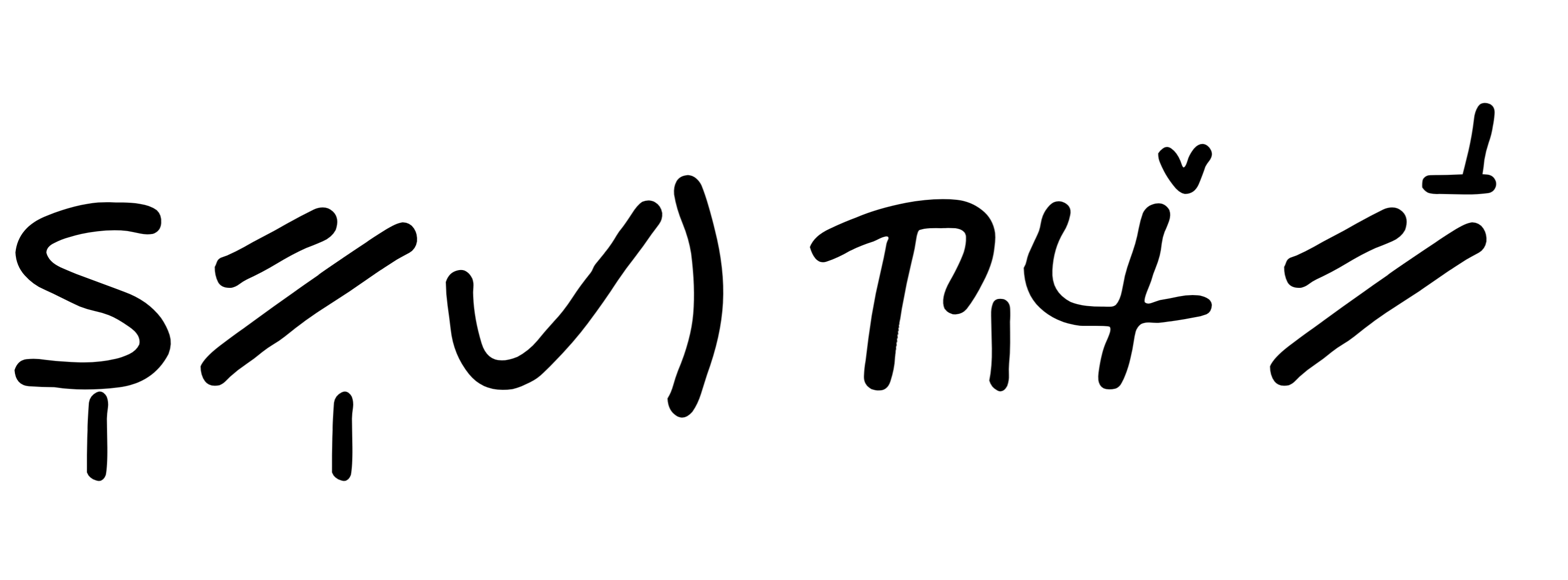
"Komering language" written in Komering script.

The Komering script is an abugida which was traditionally used to write the Ilir dialect of the Komering language. It is related to the group of Ulu scripts.
