= BASABali =

Wiki programme supporting the Balinese language

BASAbali
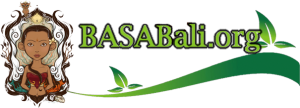
- Established: 2011; 15 years ago
- Type: Nonprofit
- Region served: Indonesia
- Website: www.basabali.org

BASAbali is a non-profit online platform established in 2011, focusing on civic engagement and promotion of the Balinese language. In addition to the Balinese language, BASAbali has a sister platform, BASAsulsel, serving the province of South Sulawesi, supporting the Makassarese and Buginese languages.

== Programs and objectives ==
BASAbali is an online "wiki" that includes a Balinese language dictionary that aims to preserve the Balinese Language, a module for regular "wikithons" on civic issues, and a cultural wiki with entries about notable artists, historical events, etc.

BASAbali was initiated to counter the diminishing use of the Balinese language. The platform seeks to reverse this trend through the development of digital resources and collaborations with local communities and schools. BASAbali wiki has evolved beyond a digital dictionary to become a community-driven space preserving the local language, culture, history, folklore, and beliefs.

== Impact and awards ==
As of 2023, the platform has over 3 million users, primarily consisting of young people aged 18–35. Women represent over 58% of total users. Individuals across Bali have contributed to the wiki by submitting video, text, photograph, and video responses.

BASAbali received the Linguapax Prize in 2018 for the preservation of linguistic diversity, promotion of multilingualism, and reactivation of linguistic communities.

Bali's governor cited the platform in 2019 as a "welcome step to preserve the Balinese language".

BASAbali received the UNESCO Confucius Prize in 2019, acknowledging its efforts in promoting literacy.

In 2022, The Institute of Electrical and Electronics Engineers (IEEE), the world’s largest engineering association, recognized BASAbali for connecting and engaging those who were underutilizing the internet as a result of the group's efforts to reach marginalized and rural communities.
