= Malayo-Sumbawan languages =

Proposed subgroup of Austronesian languages

Malayo-Sumbawan
- (controversial)
- Geographic distribution: Indonesia (Sumatra, Java, Bali, West Nusa Tenggara, Indonesian parts of Borneo), Malaysian parts of Borneo, Brunei and southern Vietnam
- Linguistic classification: Austronesian: Malayo-Polynesian; Malayo-Sumbawan
- Subdivisions: Bali–Sasak–Sumbawa; Chamic; Madurese; Malayic; Sundanese

Language codes
- Glottolog: None
- The Malayo-Sumbawan languages The languages in Cambodia, Vietnam, Hainan, and the northern tip of Sumatra are Chamic languages (purple). The Ibanic languages (orange) are found mostly inland in western Borneo, perhaps the homeland of the Malayic peoples, and across Sarawak, and other Malayic languages (dark red) range from central Sumatra, across Malaya, and throughout coastal Kalimantan. Sundanese (pink), Madurese (ocher), and the Bali–Sasak–Sumbawa languages (green) are found in and around Java.

The Malayo-Sumbawan languages are a proposed subgroup of the Austronesian languages that unites the Malayic and Chamic languages with the languages of Java and the western Lesser Sunda Islands (western Indonesia), except for Javanese (Adelaar 2005). If valid, it would be the largest demonstrated family of Malayo-Polynesian outside Oceanic. The Malayo-Sumbawan subgroup is however not universally accepted, and is rejected e.g. by Blust (2010) and Smith (2017), who supported the Greater North Borneo and Western Indonesian hypotheses. In a 2019 paper published in Oceanic Linguistics, Adelaar accepted both of these groupings, in addition to Smith's (2018) redefinition of Barito languages as forming a linkage.

== Classification ==
According to Adelaar (2005), the composition of the family is as follows:

- Malayo-Sumbawan
  - Sundanese (1 or 2 languages of western Java; incl. Baduy)
  - Madurese (2 languages of eastern Java and Madura Island, including Kangean)
  - Malayo-Chamic–BSS
    - Chamic (a dozen languages, including Acehnese in Aceh of Indonesia, and Cham in South Vietnam, Cambodia and Hainan island of China)
    - Malayic (a dozen languages dispersed from either western Borneo or central Sumatra, including Malay/Indonesian, Minangkabau in central Sumatra, and Iban of western Borneo)
    - Bali–Sasak–Sumbawa (3 languages)

Unlike in earlier classifications of the languages of the Greater Sunda islands (e.g. Isidore Dyen's "Sundic" subgroup in his 1965 lexicostatistical classification of the Austronesian languages, which included all languages later included in Adaelaar's proposal plus the Southwest Barito languages, Javanese, Gayo and Lampung), Javanese is specifically excluded; the connections between Javanese and Bali–Sasak are mainly restricted to the 'high' register, and disappear when the 'low' register is taken as representative of the languages. This is similar to the case of English, where more 'refined' vocabulary suggests a connection with French, but basic language demonstrates its closer relationship to Germanic languages such as German and Dutch. Moken is also excluded.

Sundanese appears to share sound changes specifically with Lampung, but Lampung does not fit into Adelaar's Malayo-Sumbawan.
