= Nusa Penida Balinese =

Balinese dialect spoken on Nusa Penida

- Basa Nosa ᬩᬲᬦᭀᬲ
- Native to: Indonesia (Bali)
- Region: Nusa Penida
- Ethnicity: Nusa Penida Balinese (Nak Nusé)
- Native speakers: 59,900 (2022 census)
- Language family: Austronesian: Malayo-Polynesian; Malayo-Sumbawan (?); Bali–Sasak–Sumbawa; Balinese; Highland Balinese?; Nusa Penida Balinese
- Dialects: Ped; Sakti; Bunga Mekar; Batumadeg; Batukandik; Klumpu; Kutampi Kaler; Kutampi; Batununggul; Suana; Tanglad; Sekartaji; Pejukutan
- Writing system: Latin script (Balinese Latin alphabet); Balinese script

Language codes
- ISO 639-3: –
- Glottolog: nusa1244
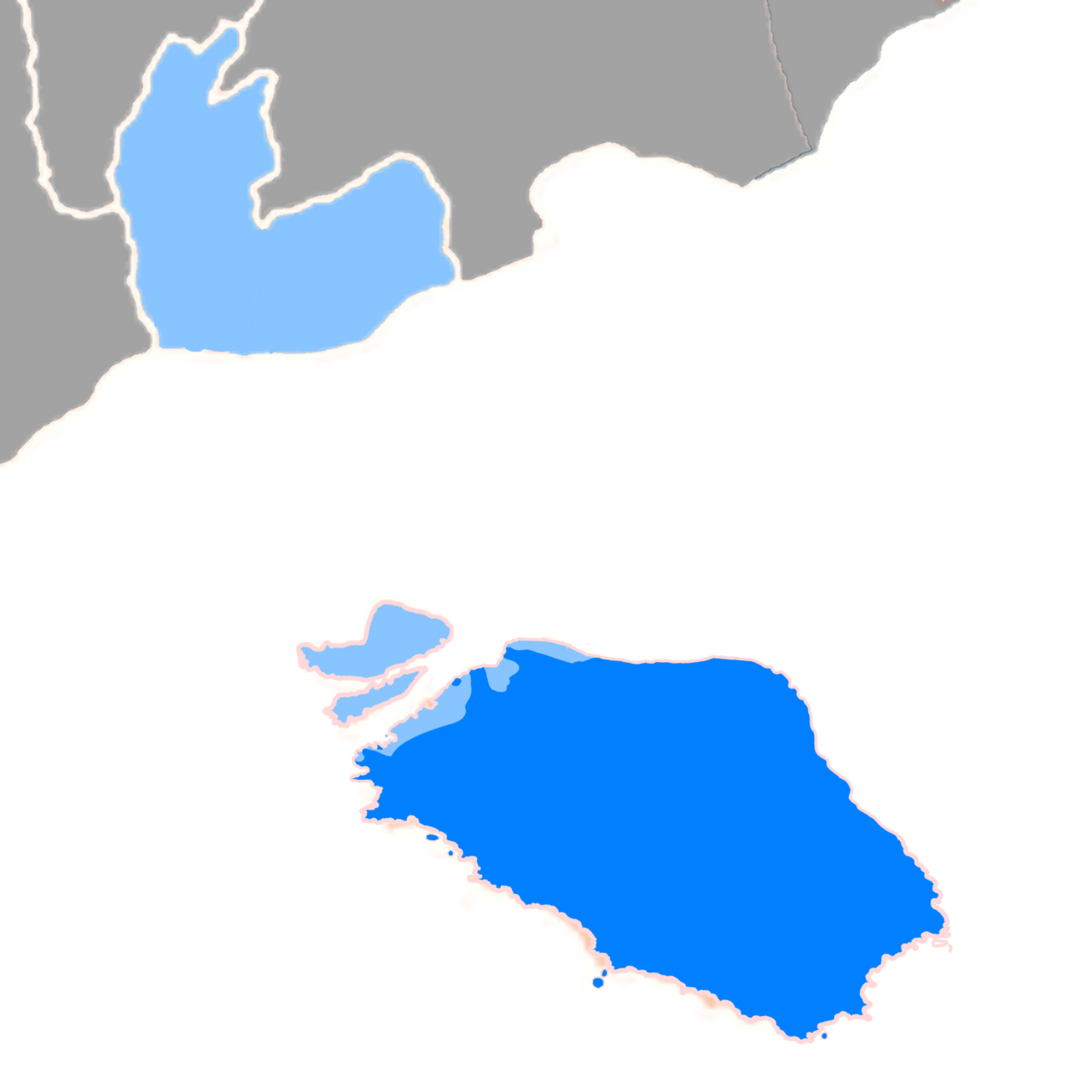
- Areas in Klungkung Regency where Nusa Penida Balinese is a majority Areas in Klungkung Regency where Nusa Penida Balinese is a minority

A village man speak everyday Nusa Penida Balinese dialect

The Nusa Penida Balinese (referred to by its speakers as Basa Nosa) is a dialect of the Balinese language spoken by the local Balinese people known locally as Nak Nusé (lit. 'people of island') that inhabiting Nusa Penida, an island located to the south of Bali which is administratively part of Klungkung Regency. This dialect is considered the most distinct among Balinese dialects, possessing unique features not found in other varieties. Due to Nusa Penida's geographical isolation from mainland Bali, it is sometimes incomprehensible to mainland Balinese speakers. The Nusa Penida dialect is often classified as a subset of the dialect of Bali Aga dialect spoken by the Bali Aga people in the highland regions of Bali.

The uniqueness of the Nusa Penida dialect compared to the mainland Balinese dialect generally lies in phonological, morphological, and intonation aspects. The Nusa Penida dialect differs not only in terms of intonation but also in its vocabulary. The intonation of Nusa Penida speakers, which tends to be short in duration and high in pitch, also poses challenges for mainland Balinese speakers to understand what is being said. In addition, like the Bali Aga dialect, the Nusa Penida dialect lacks the speech register system that is found in lowland Balinese dialects.

== Classification ==
Linguistically, the Nusa Penida Balinese is considered a dialect of Balinese, which is a Malayo-Polynesian language within the Bali-Sasak-Sumbawa branch of the Austronesian language family. This dialect is regarded as more closely related to the Bali Aga dialect spoken in the highland regions of mainland Bali than to lowland Balinese. Both the Bali Aga and Nusa Penida dialects are derived from Old Balinese and have preserved features that have been lost in modern Balinese. Numerous studies have classified the Nusa Penida dialect as a subset of the Bali Aga dialect.

== History ==
There is a suspicion that the existence of the Basa Nosa is related to the invasion of the Majapahit Kingdom led by the prime minister Gajah Mada against the Kingdom of Bali. After his inauguration ceremony as "Patih Amangkubhumi Majapahit" in 1336 AD (1258 Saka), Gajah Mada and his troops succeeded in conquering the Balinese Kingdom, including Nusa Penida which was referred to as the Gurun (?) (Note: The name Gurun also likely refers to Gorom Island, a small island east of Seram.) in the Palapa oath by Gajah Mada. This conquest is suspected to have influenced the linguistic conditions on both Bali and Nusa Penida, this is reinforced by the many similarities between Balinese, Nusa Penida and Javanese words, such as kola, etc. which is not found in mainland Balinese.

== Distribution ==
Currently, the Nusa Penida dialect is widely used only in Nusa Penida in Klungkung Regency. However, not all communities in Nusa Penida use the Nusa Penida dialect. There are several groups of people who communicate using different dialects. On the islands of Nusa Lembongan and Nusa Ceningan, which are located next to Nusa Penida, as well as in a small part of Nusa Penida close to these islands, there is a distinct dialect that is quite different from the Nusa Penida dialect. One of the most striking differences is in words like eda (you) and kola (I) in the Nusa Penida dialect. Speakers of the Nusa Lembongan dialect use words like cai or ci (you) and cang (I). Another example is əndək (Nusa Penida dialect) and tusing (Nusa Lembongan dialect), geleng-cenik, hangken-kenken, and so on. Only 13 out of 16 villages in Nusa Penida use the Nusa Penida dialect. The remaining villages either speak the Nusa Lembongan and Nusa Ceningan dialect or a dialect resembling mainland Klungkung Balinese like dialect that spoken in Kampung Toyapakeh village, one of the villages in Nusa Penida that does not speak the Nusa Penida dialect.

The Nusa Penida dialect is also used outside Nusa Penida, mainly due to the migration of its speakers following the eruption of Mount Agung in 1963 as well as the transmigration program enacted by the Indonesian government. Significant speakers relocated to southern Sumatra, particularly to Bandar Lampung, Palembang, Mesuji, and South Lampung.

== Phonology ==
This dialect is often classified as a sub-dialect of another variant within the Balinese language, namely the Bali Aga language. However, there is a notable difference between the two dialects, namely the loss or reduction of the phoneme /a/ at the end of words. This classification arises because the Nusa Penida dialect shares linguistic features with the Aga dialect, described as follows:

- The distribution of the phoneme /h/ at the beginning and middle of words;
- The presence of the endings /-ñə/ and /-cə/, which are allophonic morphemes of the ending /-ə/;
- The speakers' intonation tends to have a faster tempo and stronger stress;
- Vocabulary in the Nusa Penida dialect resembles that of the Aga dialect and its other sub-dialects.

The characteristics described above also demonstrate that both the Bali Aga dialect and the Nusa Penida dialect retain features of Old Javanese that have been lost in modern Javanese and mainland Balinese.

== Vocabulary ==
Below is a comparison of several vocabulary words in the Nusa Penida dialect and standard Balinese:

| Nusa Penida Balinese | Standard Balinese | Indonesian | English |
|---|---|---|---|
| kola, kela | cang, tiang | aku | I |
| jaba | dija, ija | dimana | where |
| éda, ida | awaké, cai, ci | kamu | you |
| lepéh | kenyel | lelah | tired |
| homah | umah | rumah | house |
| géléng | cenik | kecil | small |
| hoba | suba, ba | sudah | done |
| hangken | kénkén | kenapa | why |
| honya | onya | semua | all |
| behas | baas | beras | rice |
| behat | baat | berat | heavy |
| endék | tusing, sing | tidak | no |
| layah | seduk, layah | lapar | hungry |
| toya, yéh | yéh, toya | air | water |
| dəpinñə | dəpin | biarkan | let it be |
| pohun | puwun | terbakar | burned |
| paloh | aluh | mudah | easy |
| japan | binjepan, binjep | nanti | later |
| taloh | taluh | telur | egg |
| abian, kamol | abian | kebun | garden |
| beneh | beneh | benar | correct |
| mekrocokan | mecanda | bercanda | joking |
| hang | anak, nak | orang | people |
| hobat | ubat | obat | medicine |
| poles | pules | tidur | sleep |

In standard Balinese, the initial letter [u] is commonly used, whereas in the Nusa Penida dialect, [u] is replaced and pronounced as [o]. Additionally, the letters [o] and [h] are more frequently used at the beginning of words, such as in homah, honya, hoba, hobat, and poles.

== See also ==
- Nusa Penida
