= Nusa Penida =

Island in Indonesia

Native name: ᬦᬸᬲᬧᭂᬦᬶᬤ Nickname: Blue Paradise Island Golden Egg of Bali
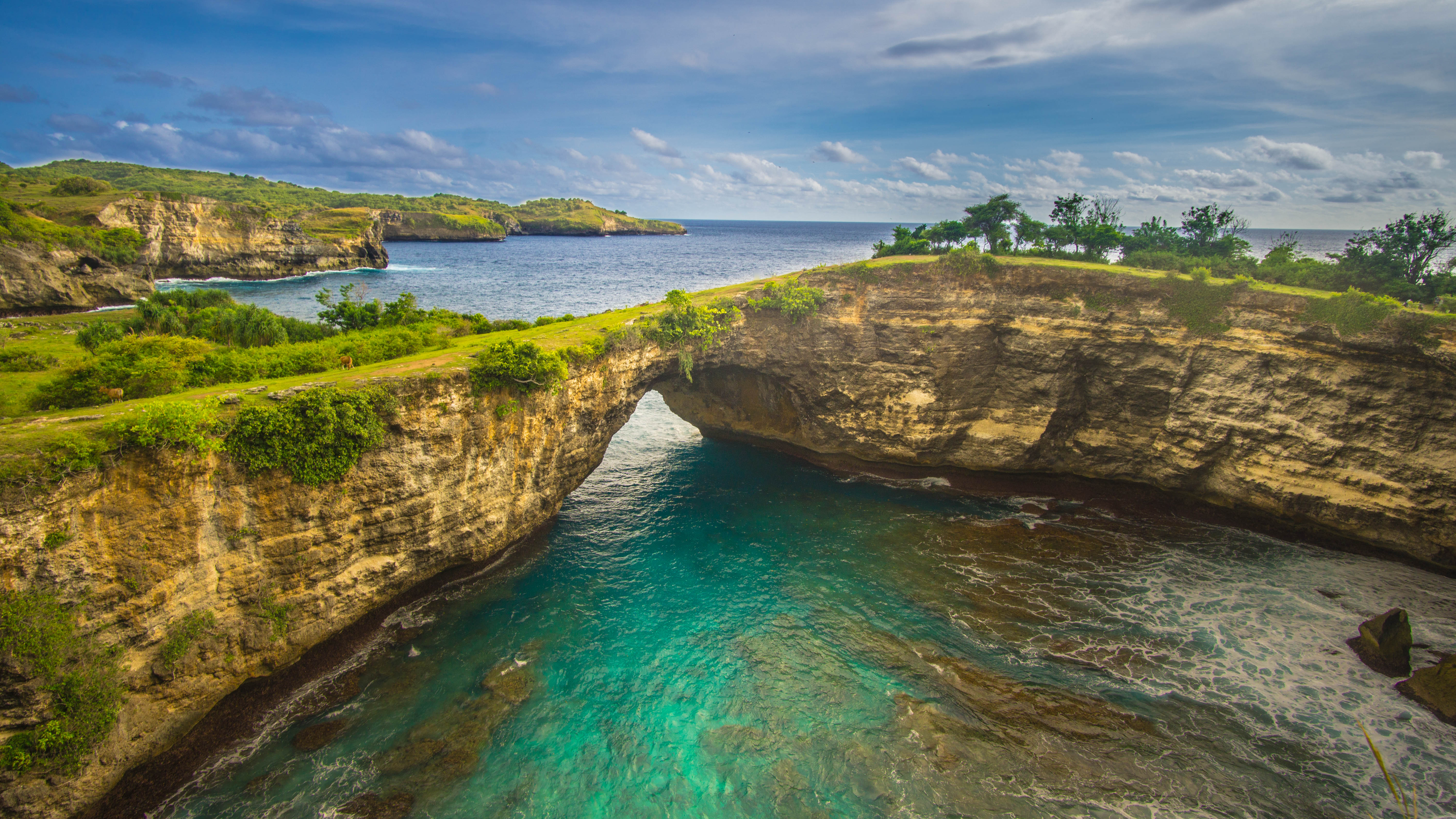
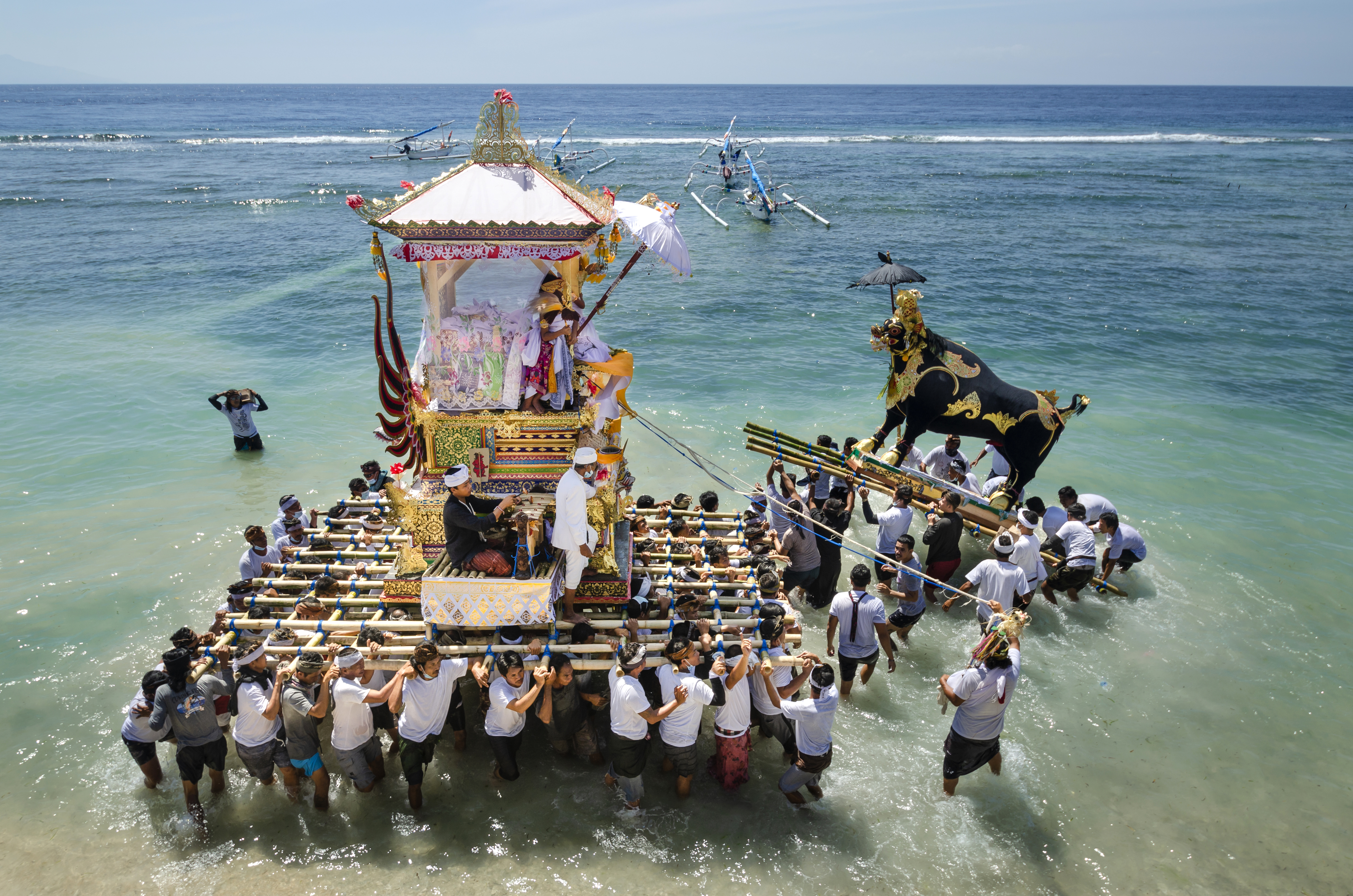
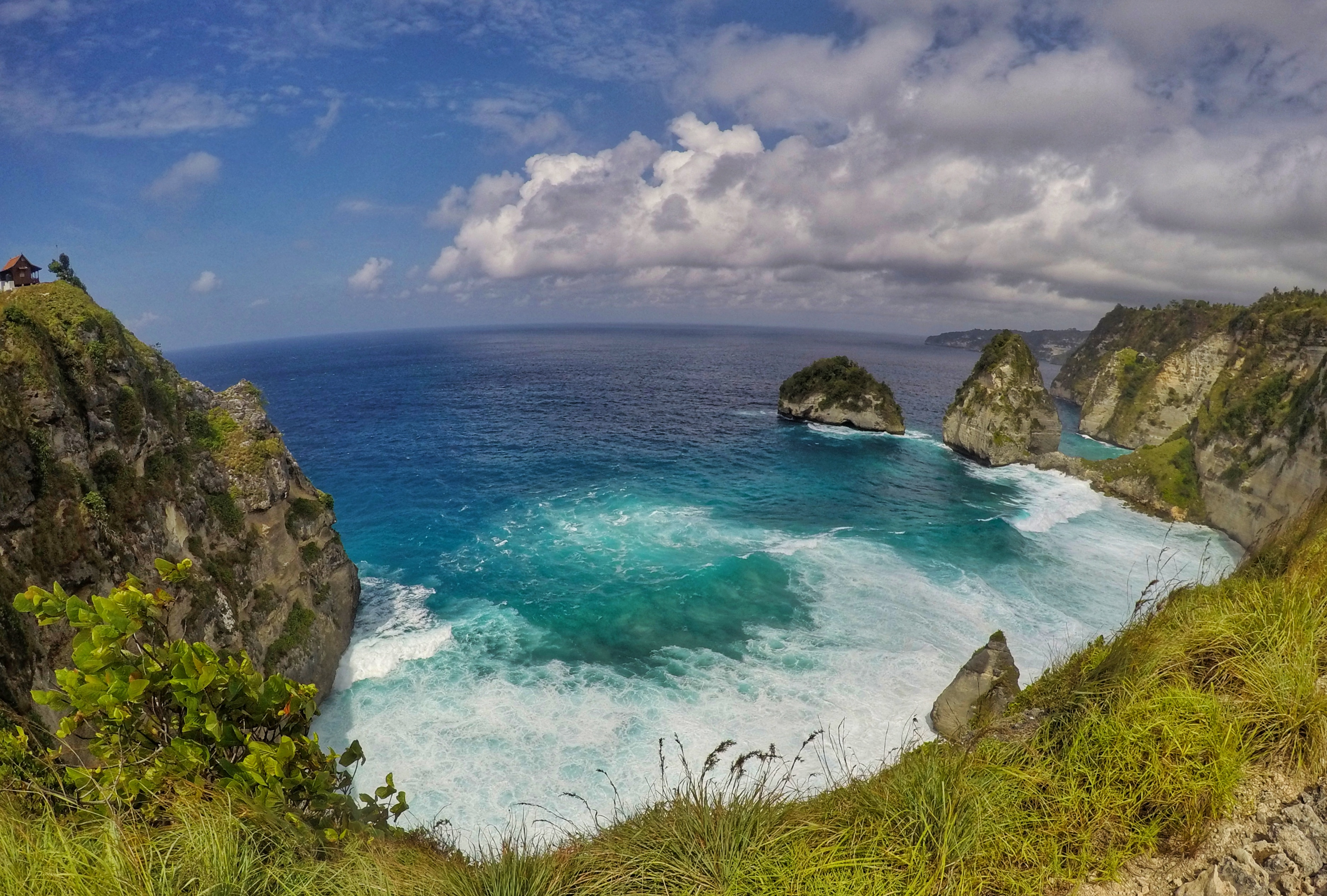
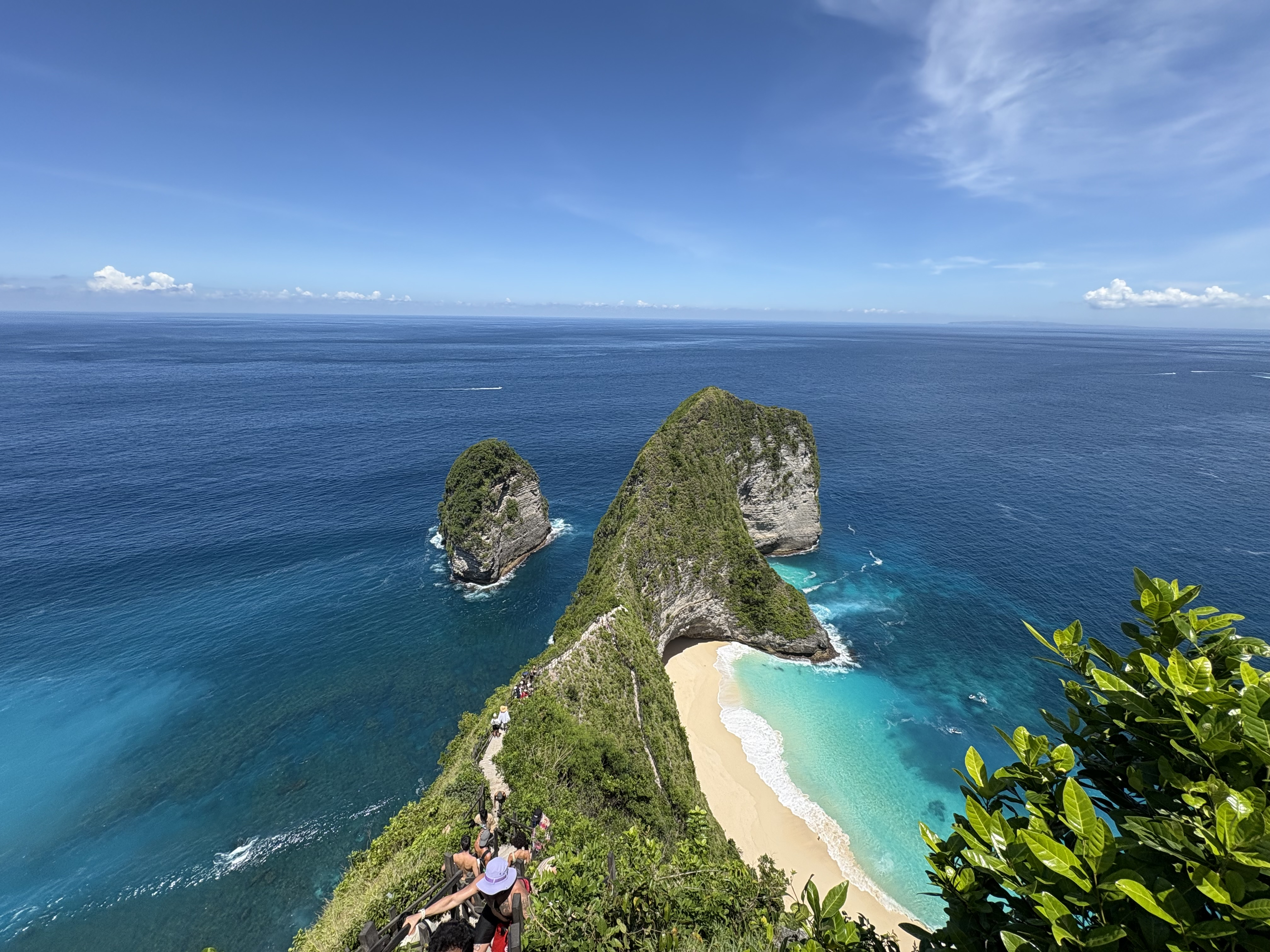
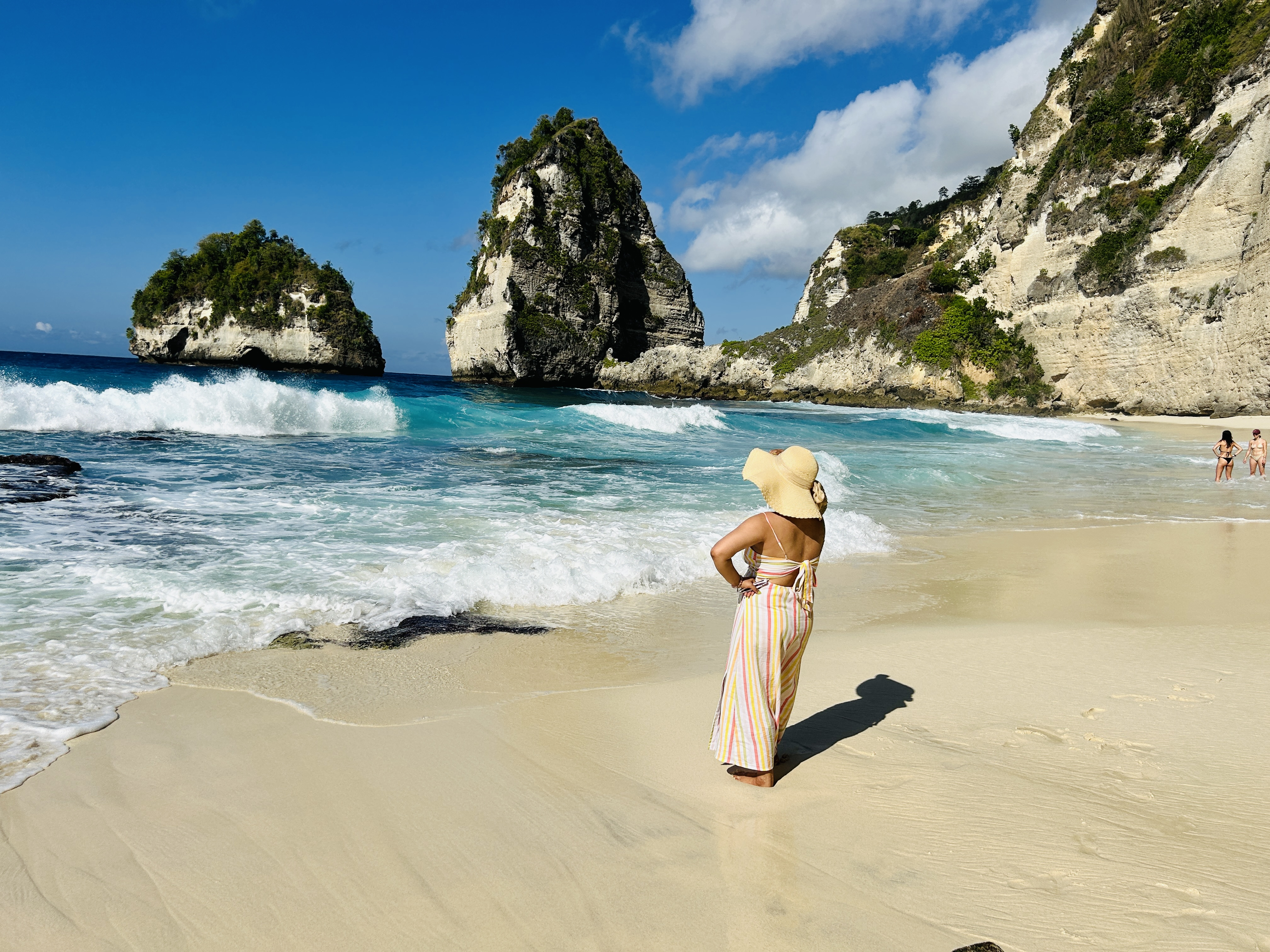
- From top, left to right: Broken beach, Ngaben ceremony in Nusa Penida, Atuh Beach, Kelingking beach, and Diamond Beach.

- Location within Bali

Geography
- Location: Southeast Asia
- Coordinates: 8°44′0″S 115°32′0″E
- Archipelago: Lesser Sunda Islands
- Area: 202.84 km^{2} (78.32 sq mi)
- Highest point: Mount Mundi

Administration
- Indonesia
- Province: Bali
- Regency: Klungkung Regency
- District: Nusa Penida
- Largest settlement: Batukandik (pop. 6,500)

Demographics
- Population: 65,820 (mid 2024)
- Pop. density: 324.5/km^{2} (840.5/sq mi)
- Languages: Nusa Penida Balinese, Indonesian
- Ethnic groups: Balinese and other minority ethnic groups

Nusa Penida (Indonesian pronunciation: [nuˈsa pəˈnida]; Balinese: ᬦᬸᬲᬧᭂᬦᬶᬤ, romanized: nusa pĕnida) is an island located near the southeastern Indonesian island of Bali, which forms a district of the same name in Klungkung Regency. The Badung Strait separates the island and Bali. The interior of Nusa Penida is hilly with a maximum altitude of 524 metres, and the climate is drier than Bali. Similar to Bali, it is a major tourist destination.

In addition to Nusa Penida, the administrative district of Nusa Penida includes the nearby islands of Nusa Lembongan and Nusa Ceningan, plus eleven even smaller islands. The district had a population of 45,110 at the 2010 census, covering 202.84 km^{2} (78.32 sq mi), and the official estimate as of 2024 was 65,820.

== Etymology ==
Nusa Penida derives from the Balinese language, with “Nusa” meaning “island” and “Penida” meaning “priest”. Hence, Nusa Penida literally translates to “island of priests”.

== History ==
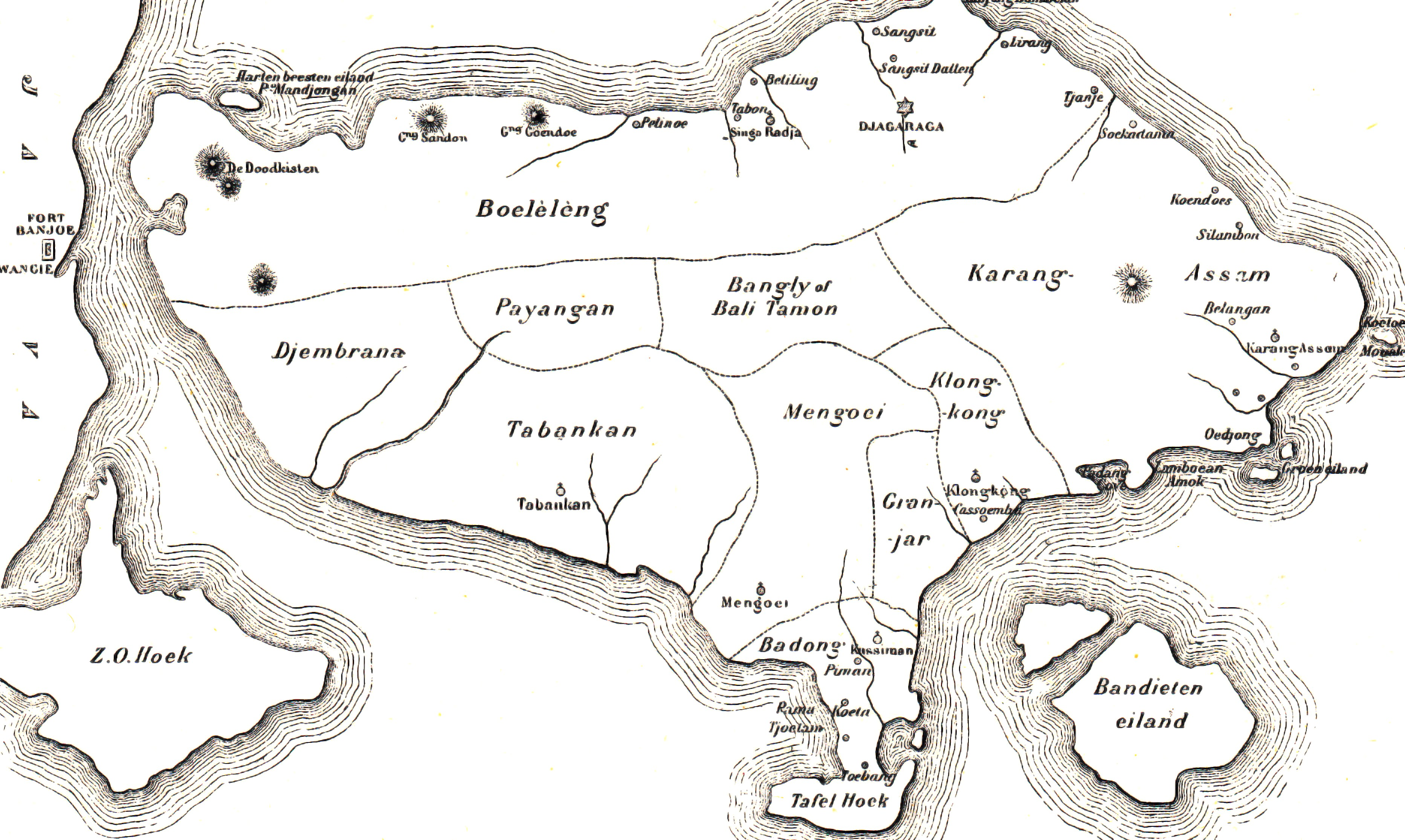
Map of the nine Balinese kingdoms, circa 1900. On this historical map, Nusa Penida is written Bandieten eiland in Dutch which means "Bandit Island" because of the exile of criminals, political opponents, or convicts to the island.

The history of the island of Nusa Penida in Bali began in the 10th century. The earliest writings about Nusa Penida have indeed been found on the Belanjong pillar, which dates back to 914 AD. This pillar contains an inscription that mentions the military expedition of the first Balinese King, Sri Kesari Warmadewa, to conquer Nusa Penida.

The people of Nusa Penida was long able to fight off Balinese kings who organized many military expeditions. However, in the second half of the 17th century, the island of Nusa Penida was conquered by the Gelgel Dynasty expedition. The last king of Nusa Penida, Dalem Bungkut, was killed in battle. Nusa Penida then became part of the Klungkung palace, one of the nine kingdoms in Bali. After the integration of Bali into the Dutch East Indies in 1908 which later became Indonesia, Nusa Penida remained attached to Klungkung Regency.

A Dutch map made in 1900 refers to Nusa Penida as Bandit Island because the Klungkung Kingdom once deported criminals, political opponents and black magic experts to Nusa Penida.

== Geography ==
Administratively, this district in Klungkung Regency consists of 4 districts (Klungkung District, Banjarangkan District, Dawan District and Nusa Penida District). Nusa Penida District consists of three islands, namely Nusa Penida Island, Lembongan Island and Ceningan Island, and consists of 16 Village Offices. Nusa Penida Island can be reached from four dock locations.

== Language ==
The people of Nusa Penida speak a unique dialect of Balinese called Nusa Penida Balinese (Basa Nosa), which cannot be understood by speakers from mainland Bali. It is reportedly close to the language of the Bali Aga, Bali's aboriginal population.

== Conservation ==
=== Bali Bird Sanctuary ===
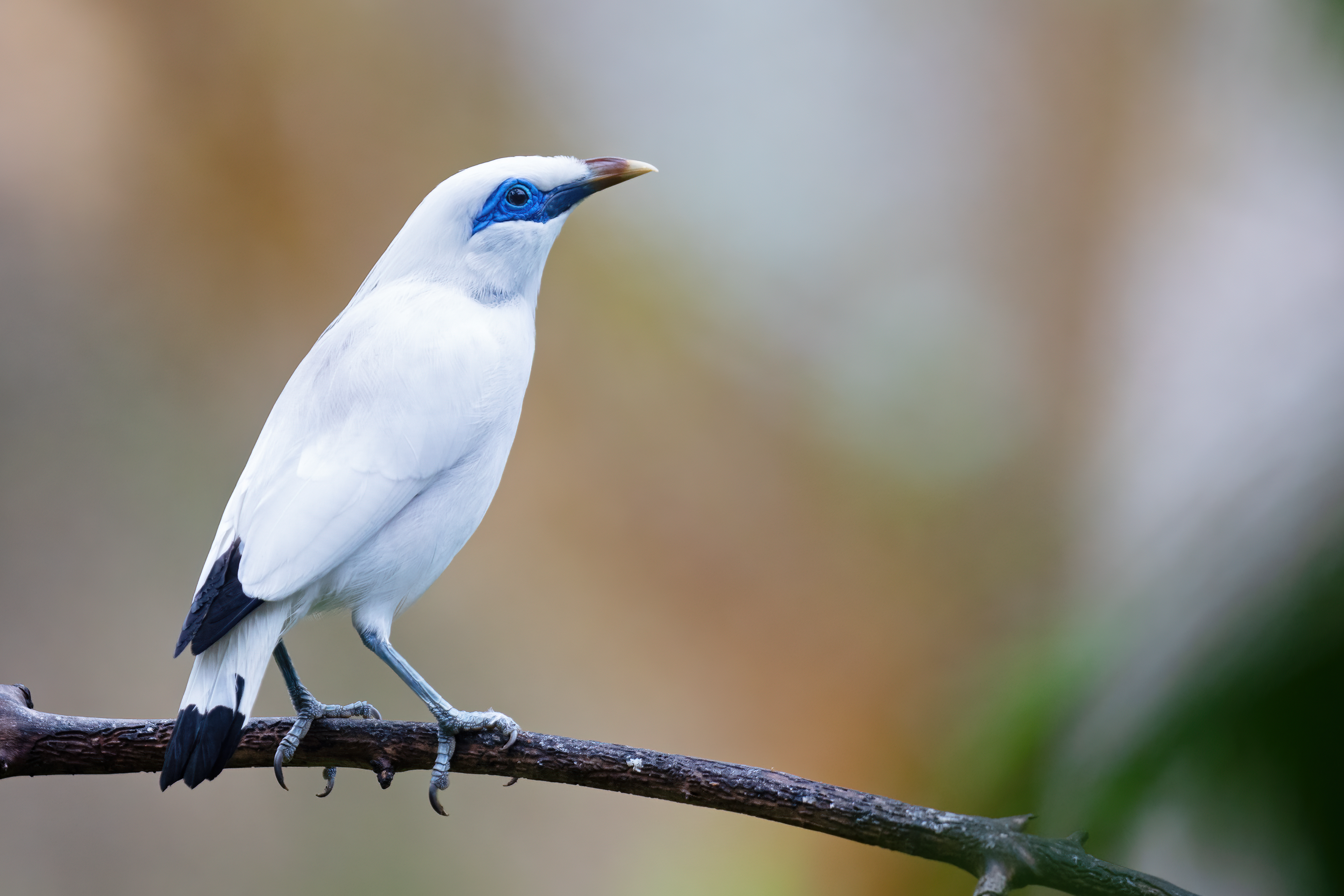
A Bali Myna, is a protected bird species in Nusa Penida and was once the last habitat of this bird.

Nusa Penida, together with neighbouring Lembongan and Ceningan Islands, forms a bird sanctuary. The island communities have used traditional Balinese village regulations to create the sanctuary. The idea of a sanctuary came from the Friends of the National Parks Foundation (FNPF) (now known as the Friends of Nature, People and Forests).

In 2006 all 35 villages (now 41 villages) agreed to make bird protection part of their traditional regulations (Balinese: ᬳᬯᬶᬕ᭄ᬳᬯᬶᬕ᭄, romanized: awig-awig). Since then, the FNPF has rehabilitated and released various Indonesian birds, most notably the critically endangered Bali starling/Bali myna which is endemic to Bali but whose numbers in the wild had declined to less than 10 in 2005. After a two-year program by FNPF in which 64 cage-bred birds were rehabilitated and released onto Nusa Penida, their number had increased to over 100 in 2009. Isolated from the mainland of Bali, Nusa Penida and its neighboring island of Nusa Ceningan have advantages compared to their natural habitat on the island of Bali. From the results of the evaluation of vegetation and abundance of food on this karst island, Nusa Penida is quite abundant with various types of fruits, insects and various foods that are suitable for the living space of the Bali starling.

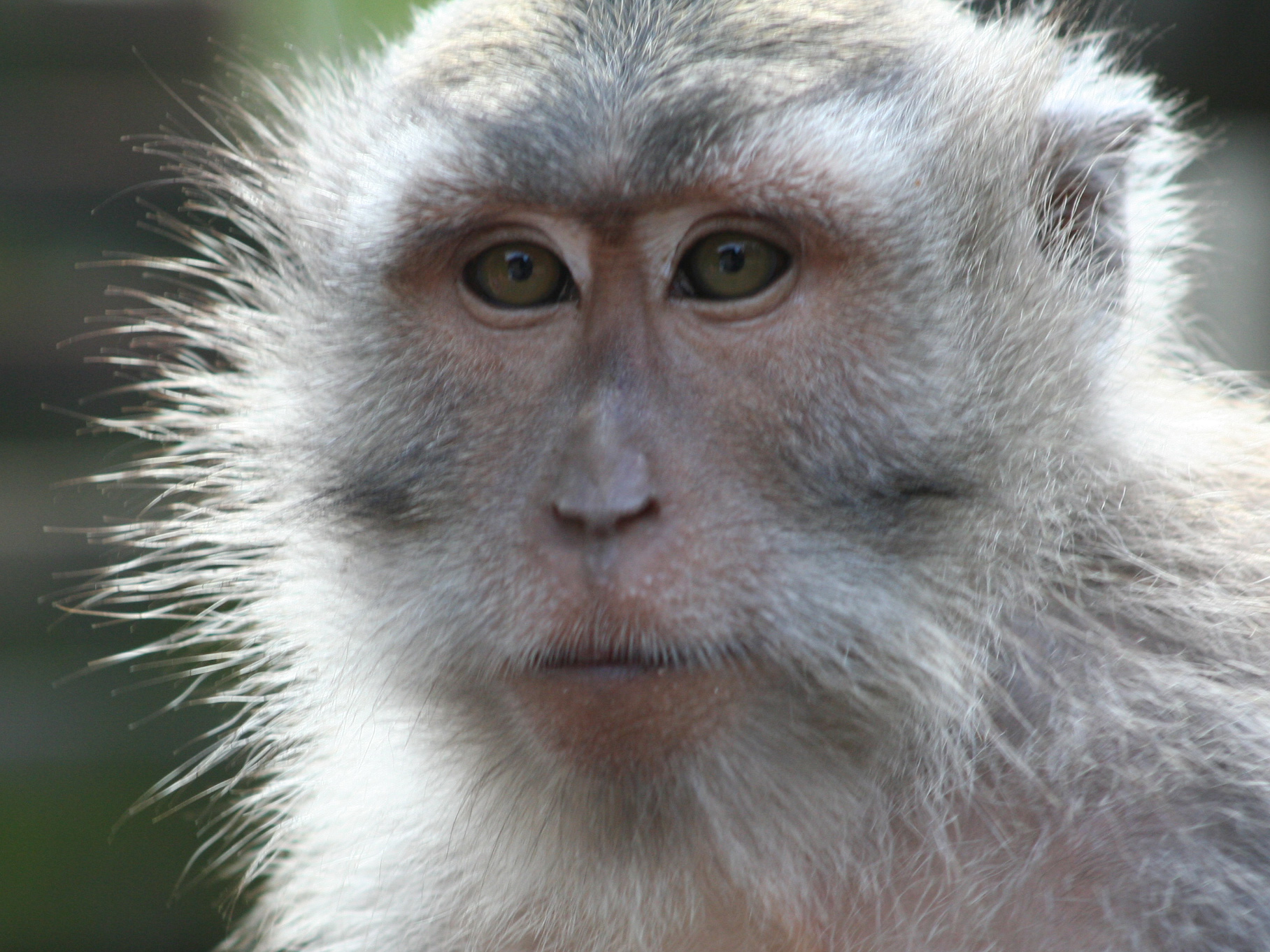
An adult macaque monkey in Nusa Penida.

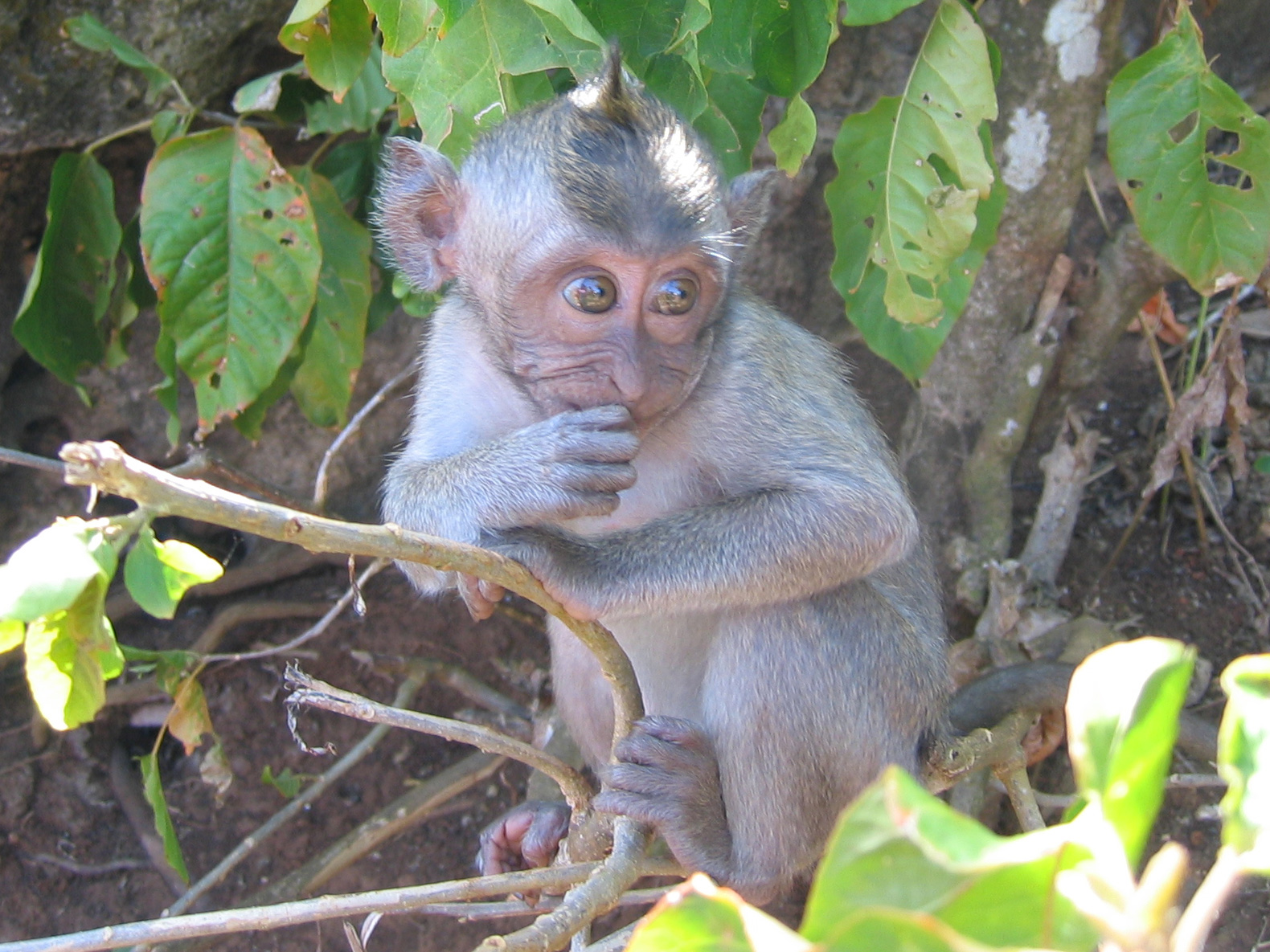
A young macaque monkey in Nusa Penida.

== Tourism ==
=== Destinations ===
Points of interest on Nusa Penida include:

- Kelingking Beach
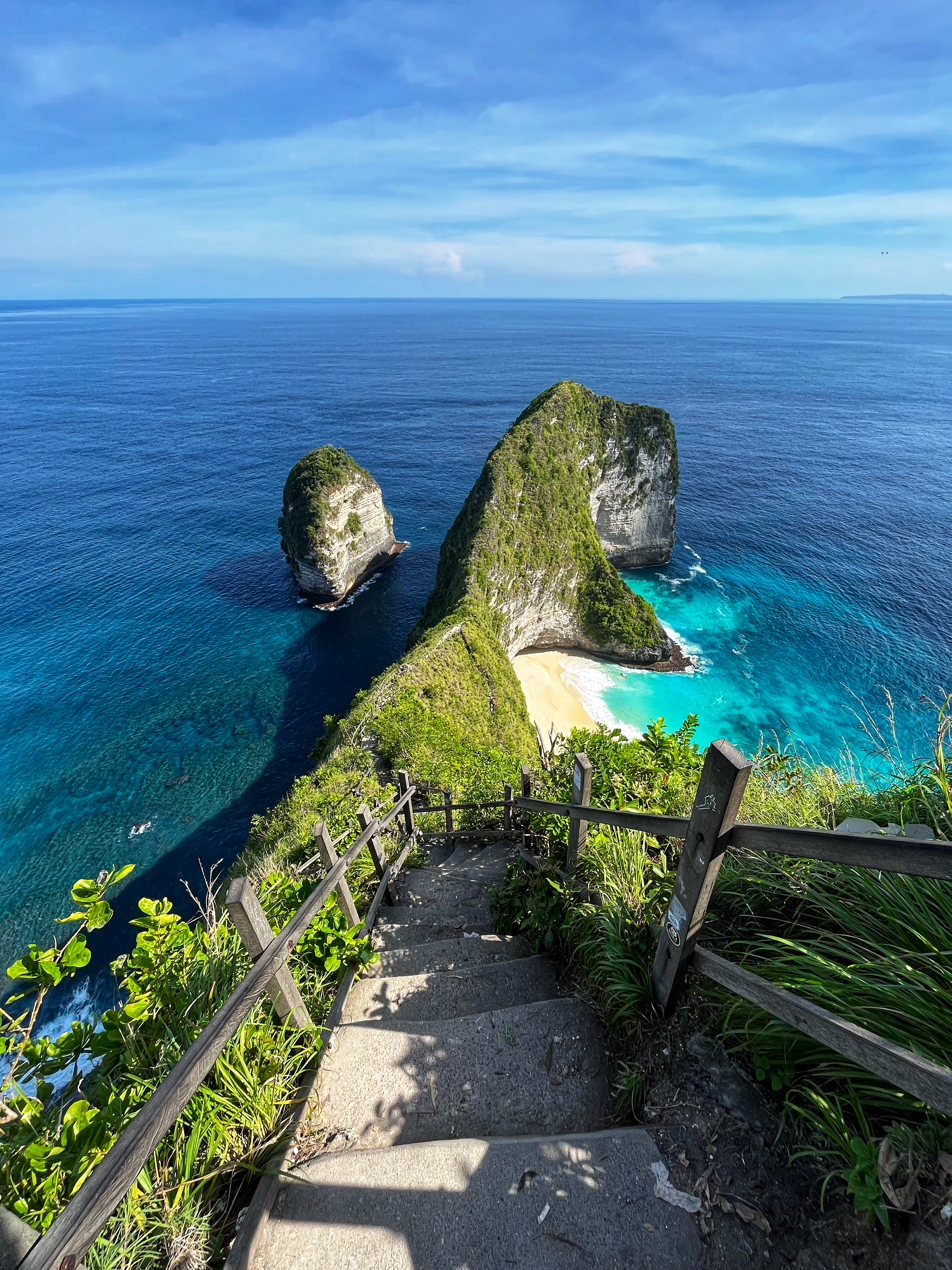
  Kelingking Beach
- Broken Beach
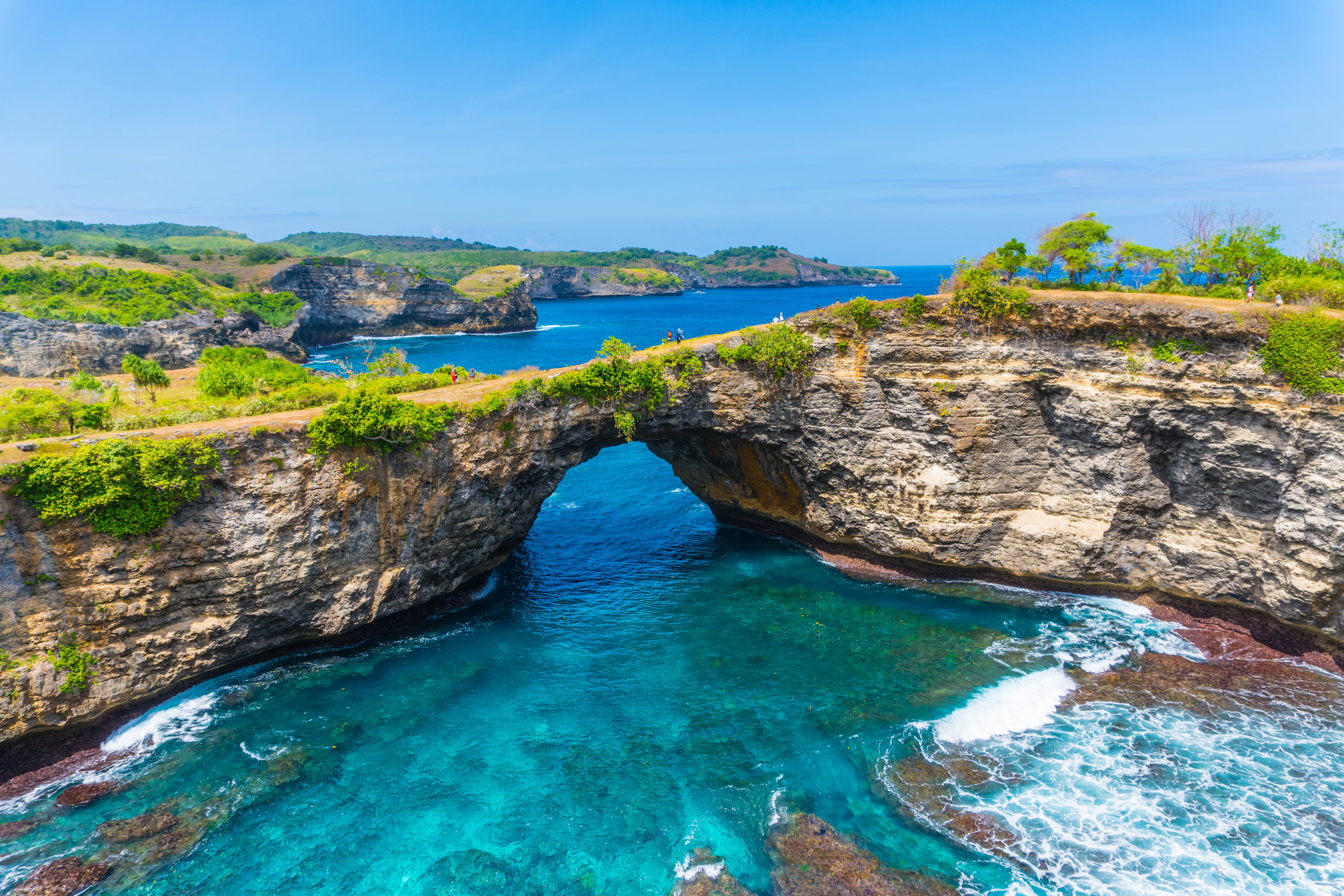
  Broken Beach, Nusa Penida
- Angel Billabong
- Crystal Bay
- Atuh Beach
- Diamond Beach
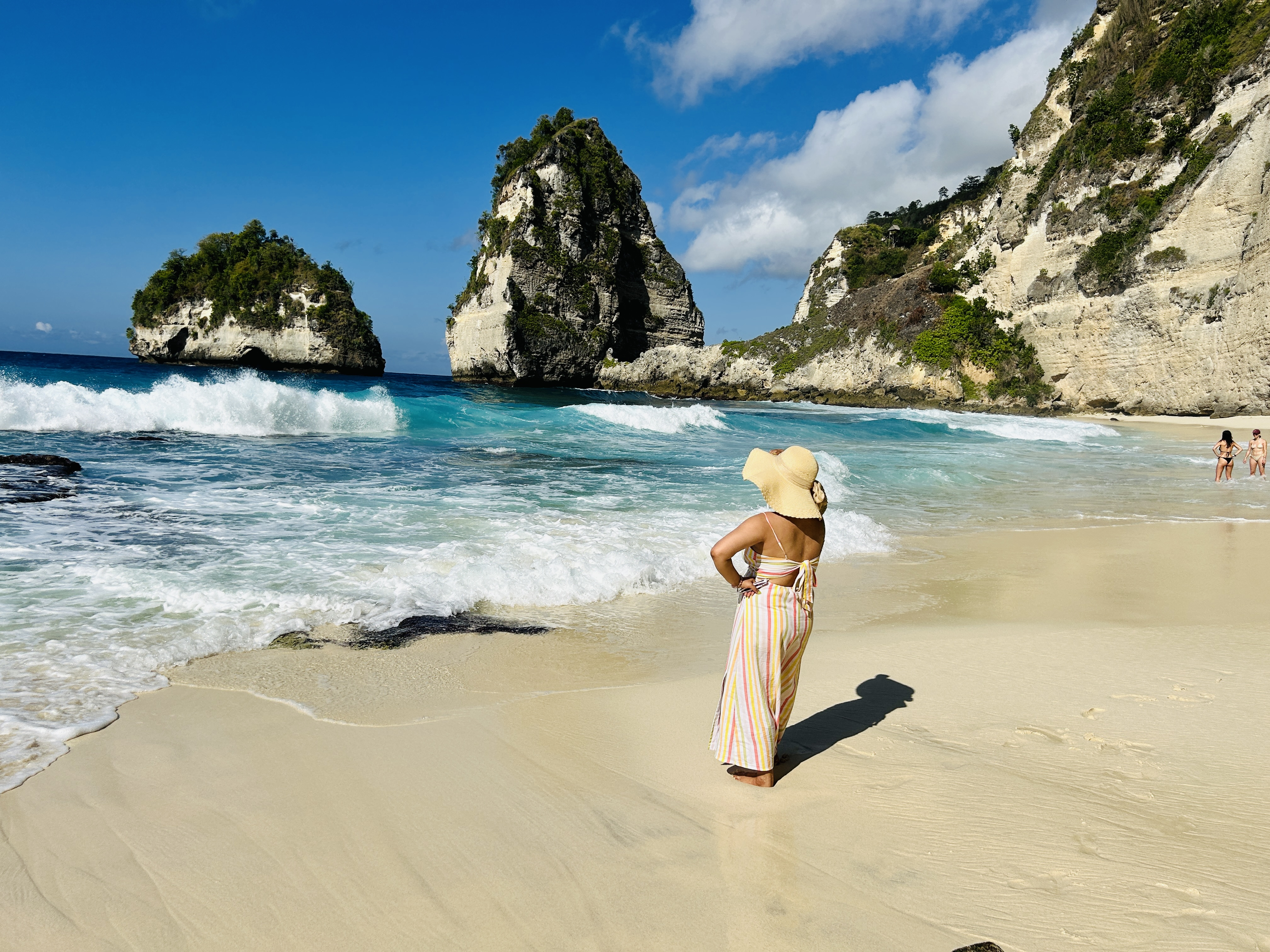
  Diamond Beach
- Suwehan Beach
- Peguyangan Waterfall
- Tembeling Forest
- Segening Waterfall

=== Dive sites ===
Nusa Penida covers a wide area of diving locations, including Penida Bay, Batu Lumbung (Manta Point), Batu Meling, Batu Abah, Toya Pakeh, and Malibu Point. The flow through the Lombok Strait is, overall, south-tending, although the strength and direction of the tidal streams are influenced by the monsoon seasons.

During the southeast monsoons, the tidal flow tends south; during the northeast monsoons, the tidal flow tends north. In the area of the strait north of Nusa Penida, the pattern is relatively simple, with a flow, at peak tide, of about three-and-one-half knots. Tidal streams in Badung Strait are semi-diurnal, but the character of the stream is very complicated because its direction runs obliquely to the general south-to-north direction of Lombok Strait, and the channel has a curved shape.

Based on a survey in 2009, there were about 1,419 hectares of coral sites with 66 percent covering the sites in 3 metres depth and 74 percent covered the sites in 10 metres depth.

In December 2024, a colony of Galaxea astreata, one of the largest coral colonies in the world, was discovered, covering an area of approximately 4000 m^{2} with dimensions 34 m (width), 32 m (length) and 5.5 m (height).

== In popular culture ==
- Noesa Penida, a 1941 film by Andjar Asmara

== Gallery ==
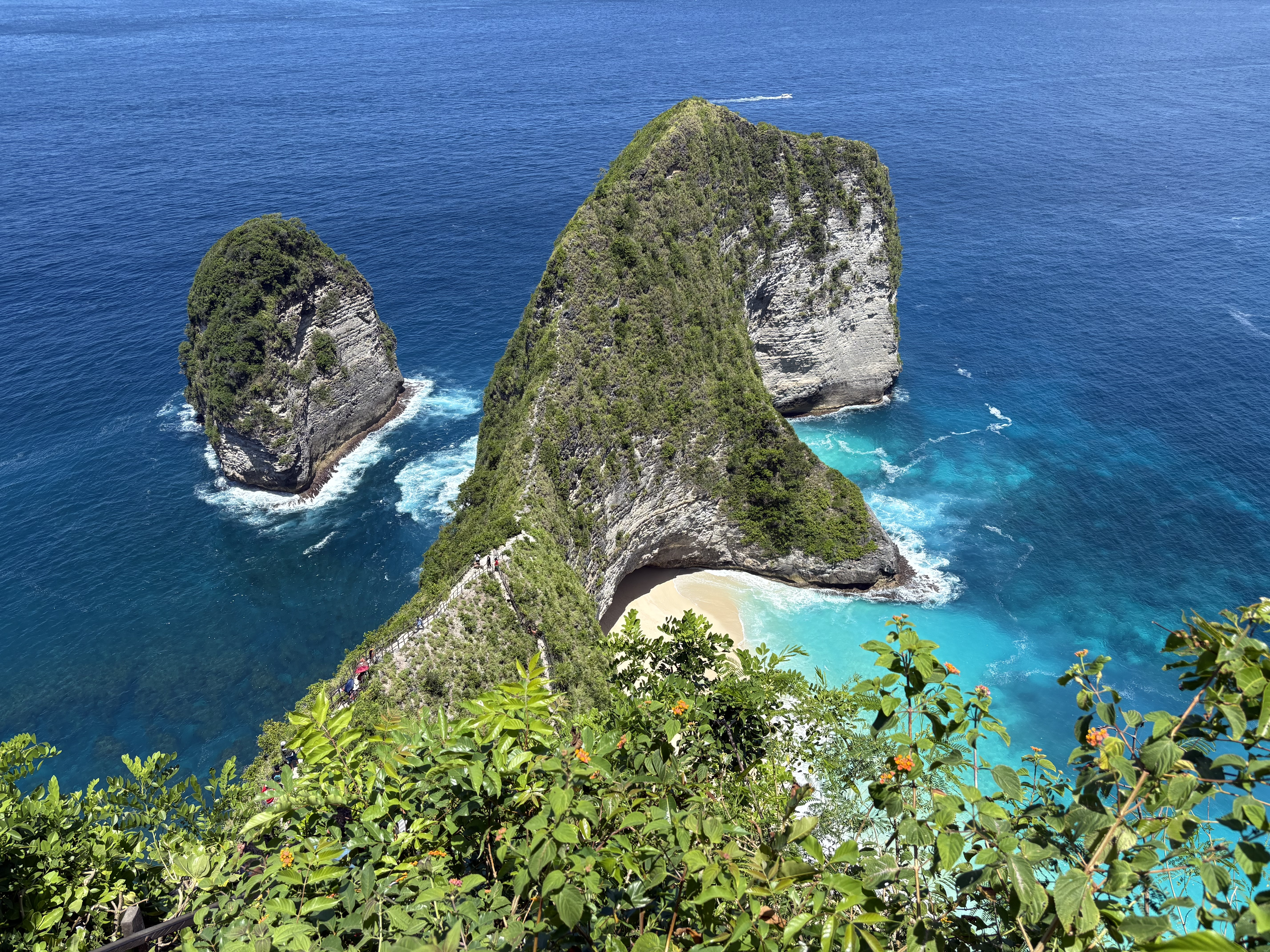
Kelingking Beach

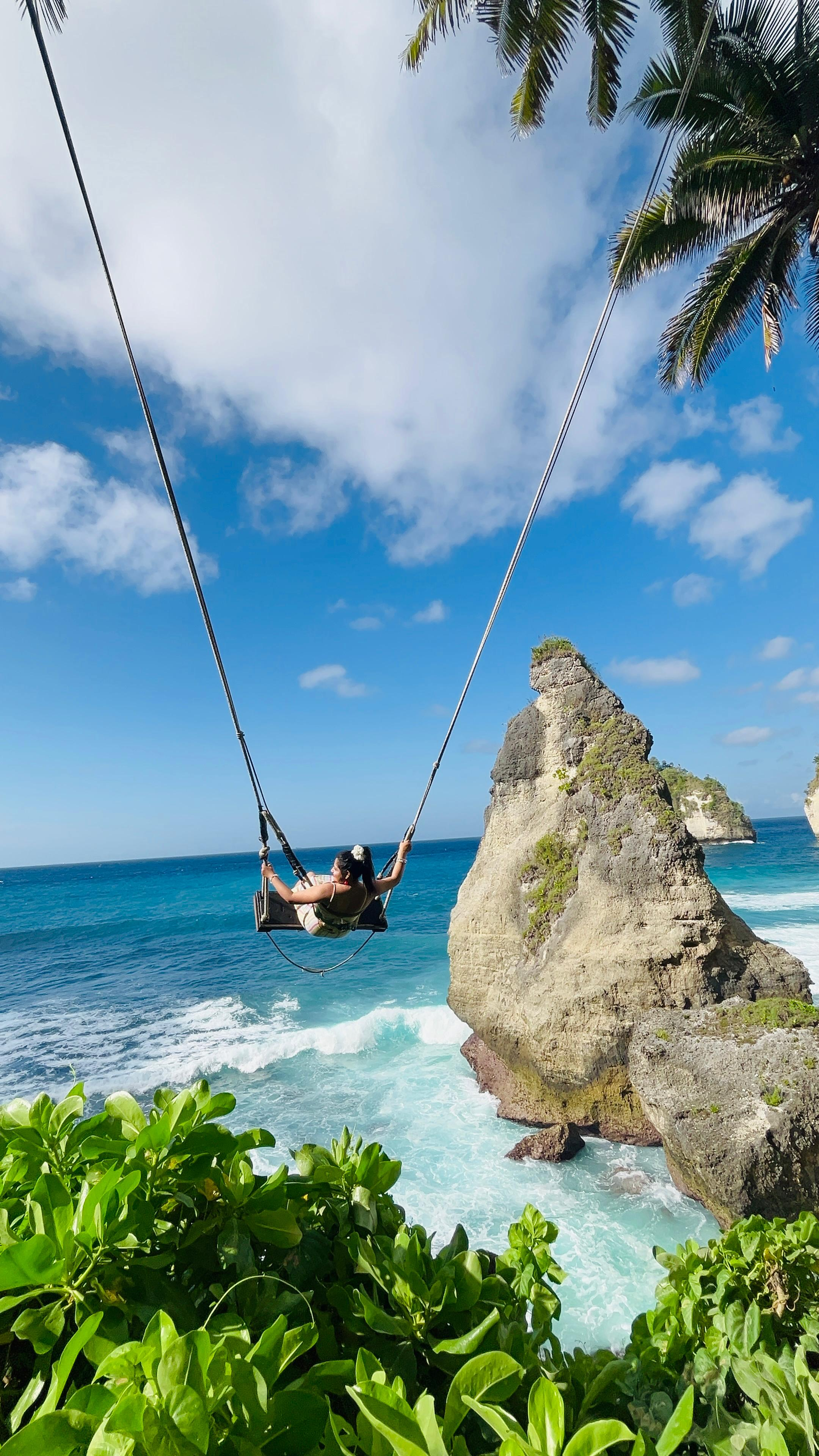
Diamond Beach Nusa Penida

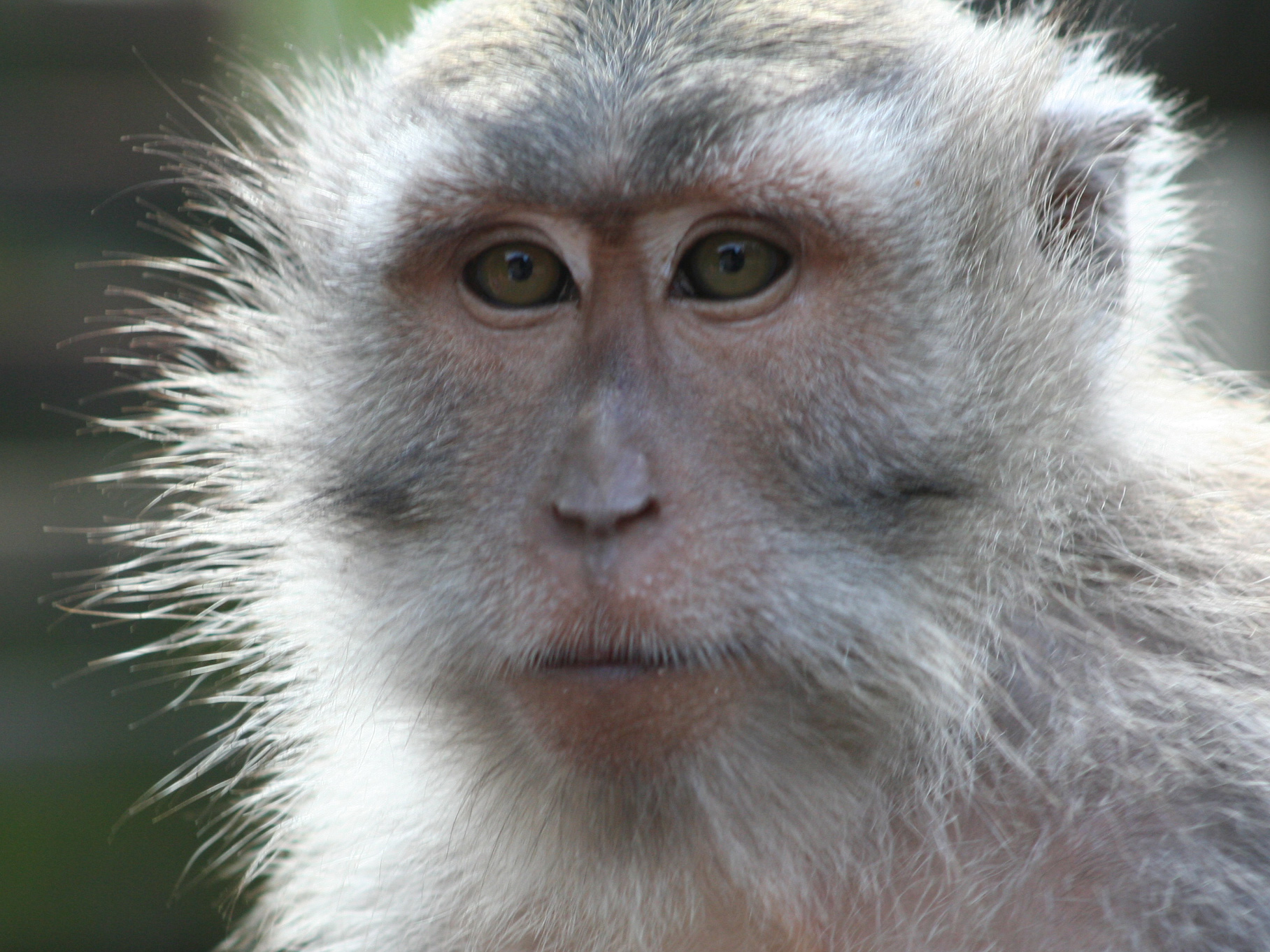
An adult macaque monkey in Nusa Penida

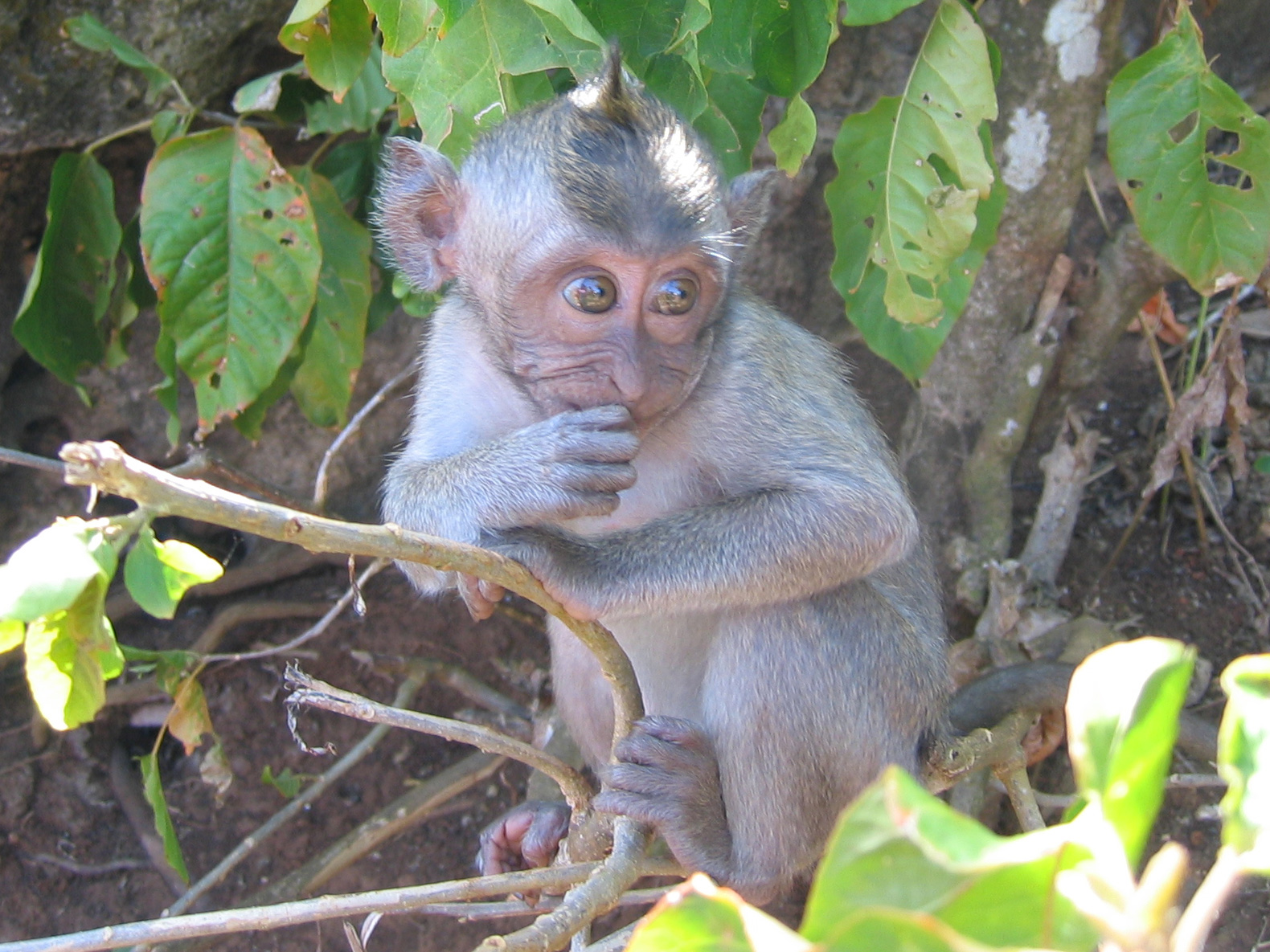
A young macaque monkey in Nusa Penida

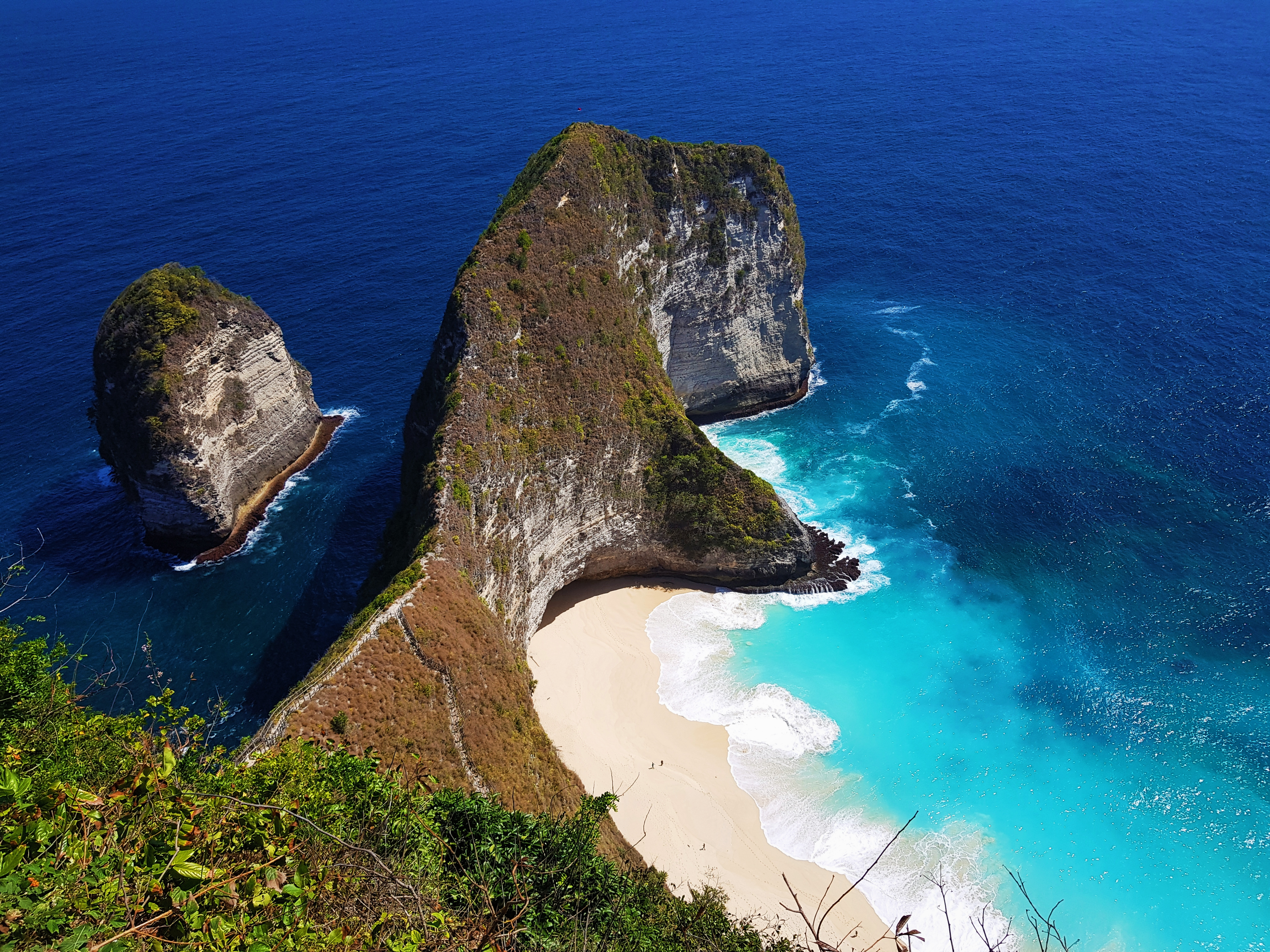
Rocks that are shaped like little fingers (called "Kelingking" by the locals), that's where the name Kelingking Beach gets its name.

== See also ==
- Nusa Penida Balinese
- List of islands in Indonesia
- Nusa Lembongan
- Nusa Ceningan
- Bali
