= Nusa Lembongan =

Island in Indonesia

Native name: ᬦᬸᬲᬮ᭄ᬮᭂᬫ᭄ᬩᭀᬗᬦ᭄
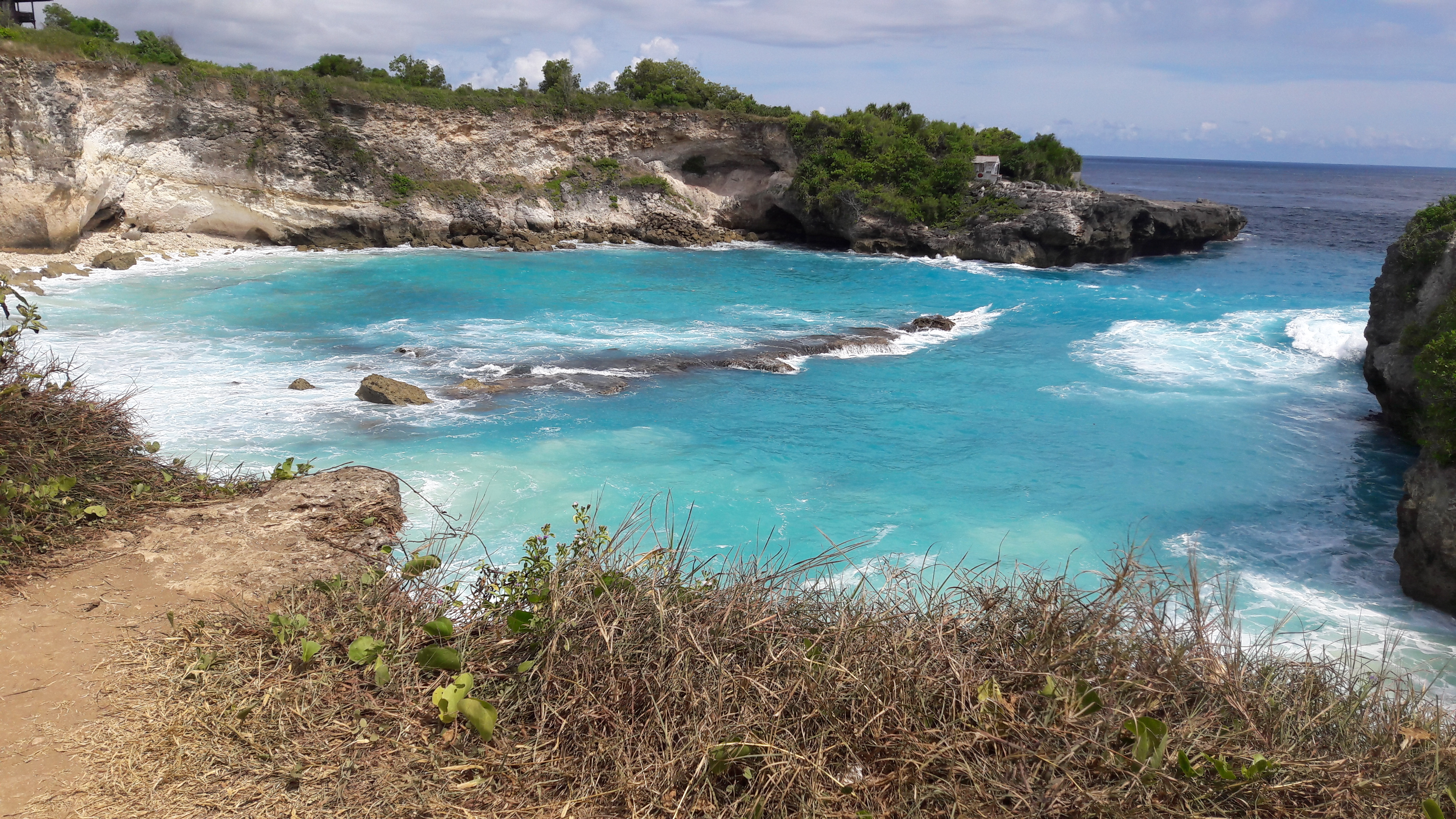
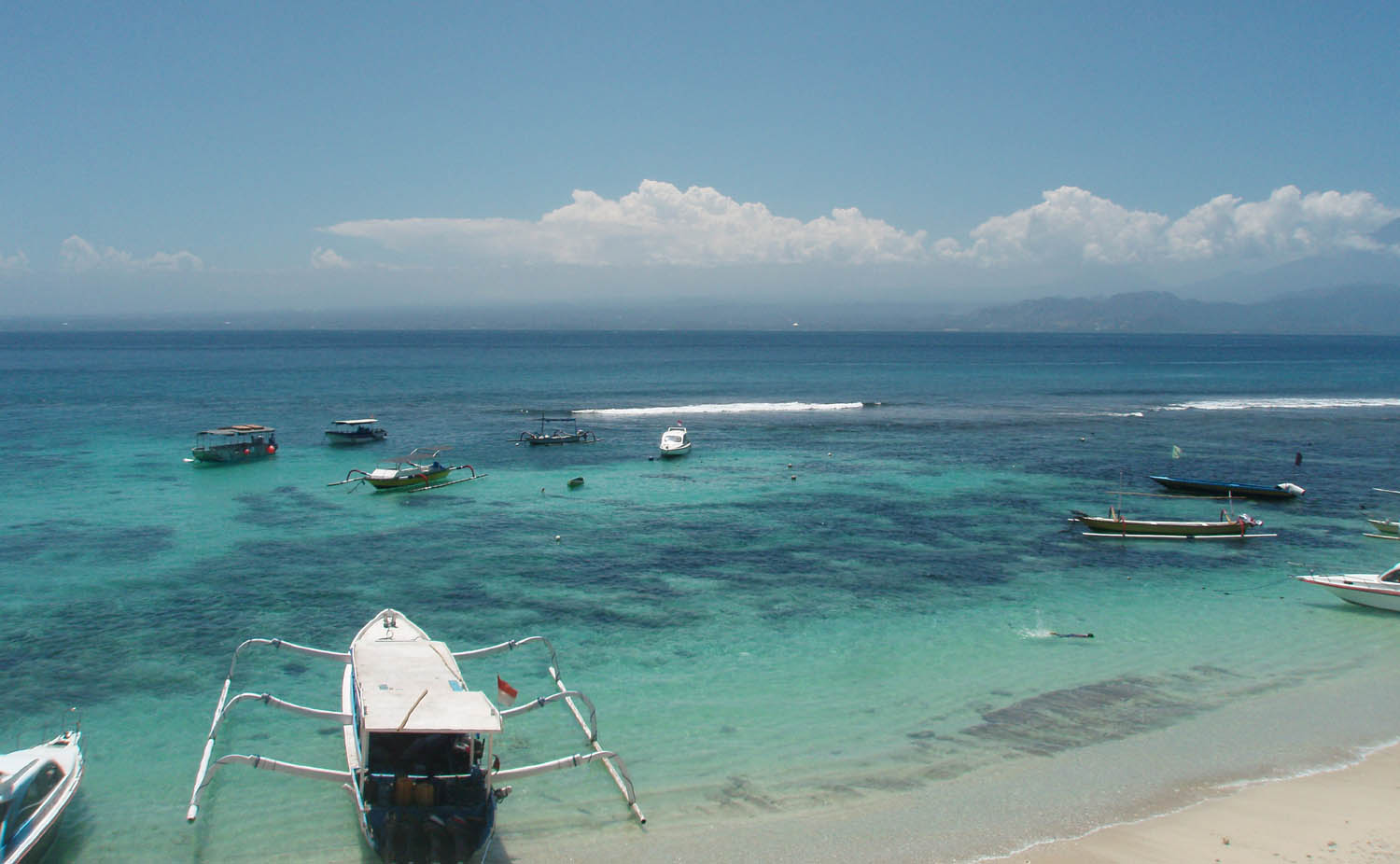
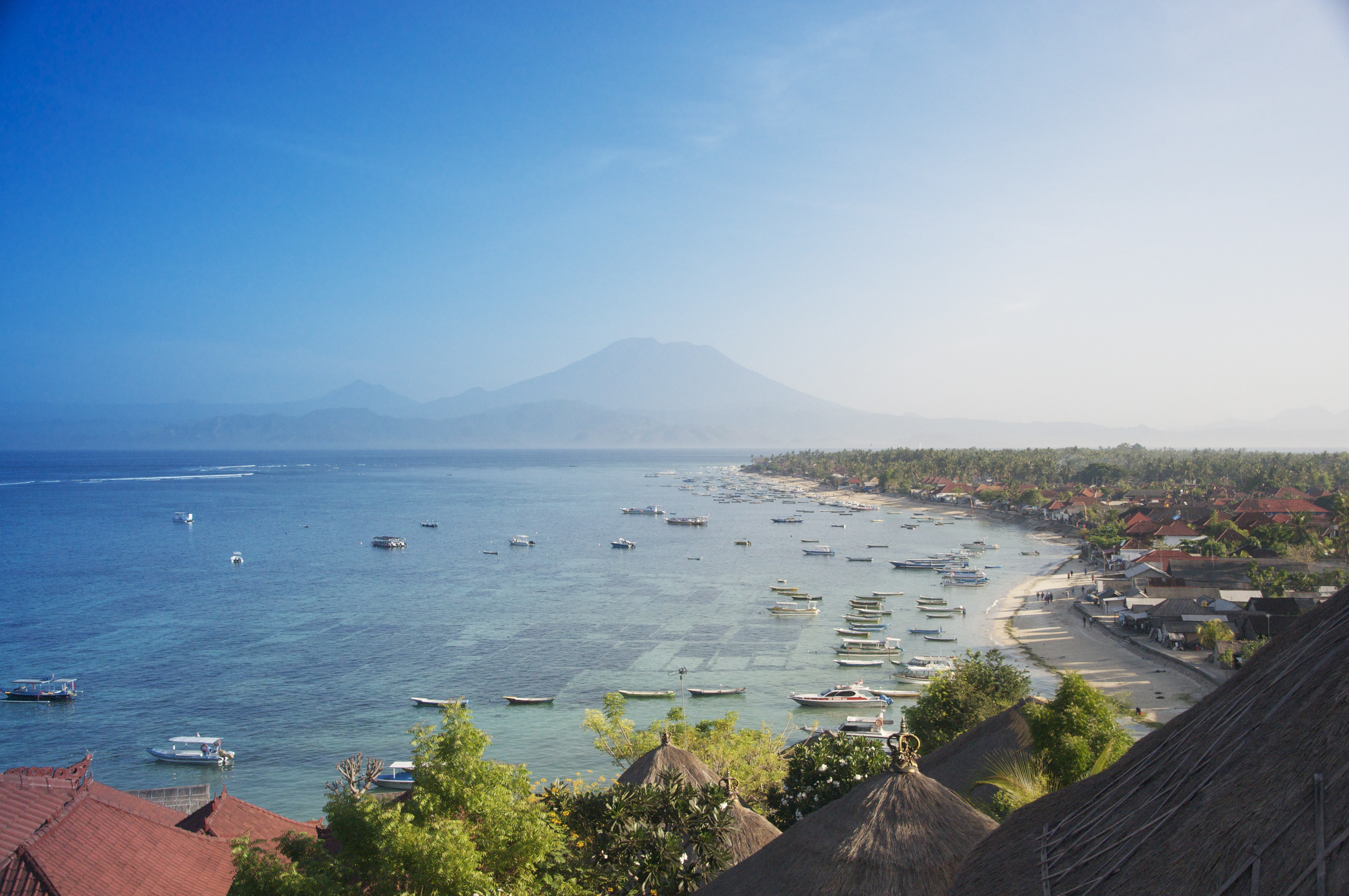
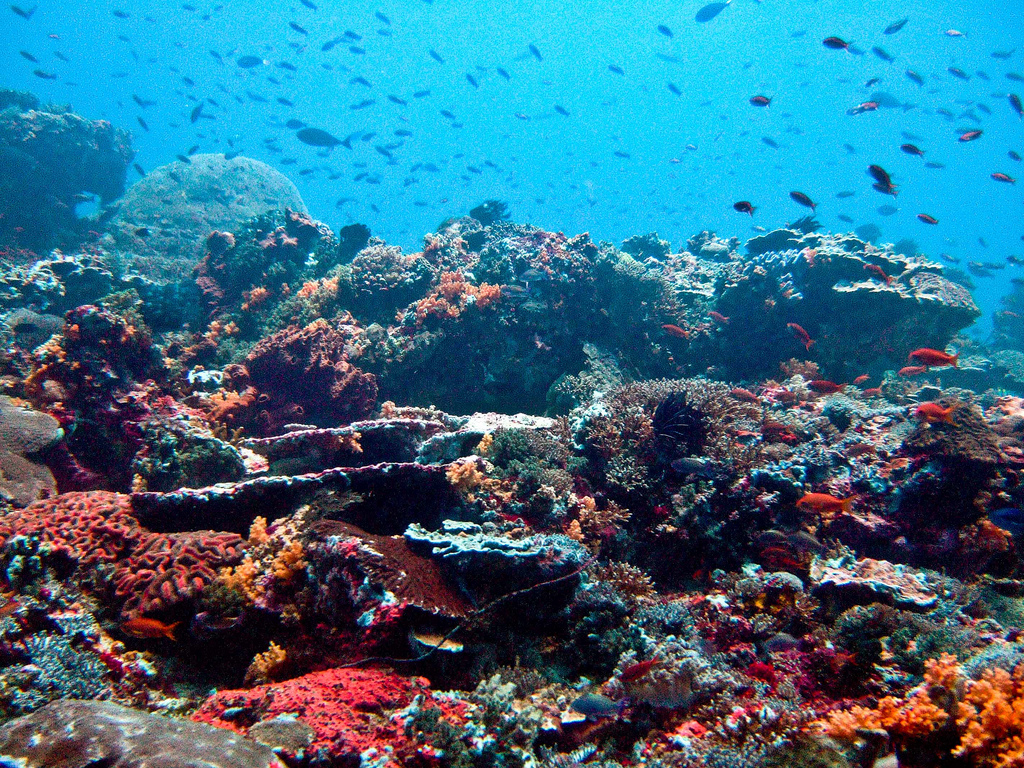
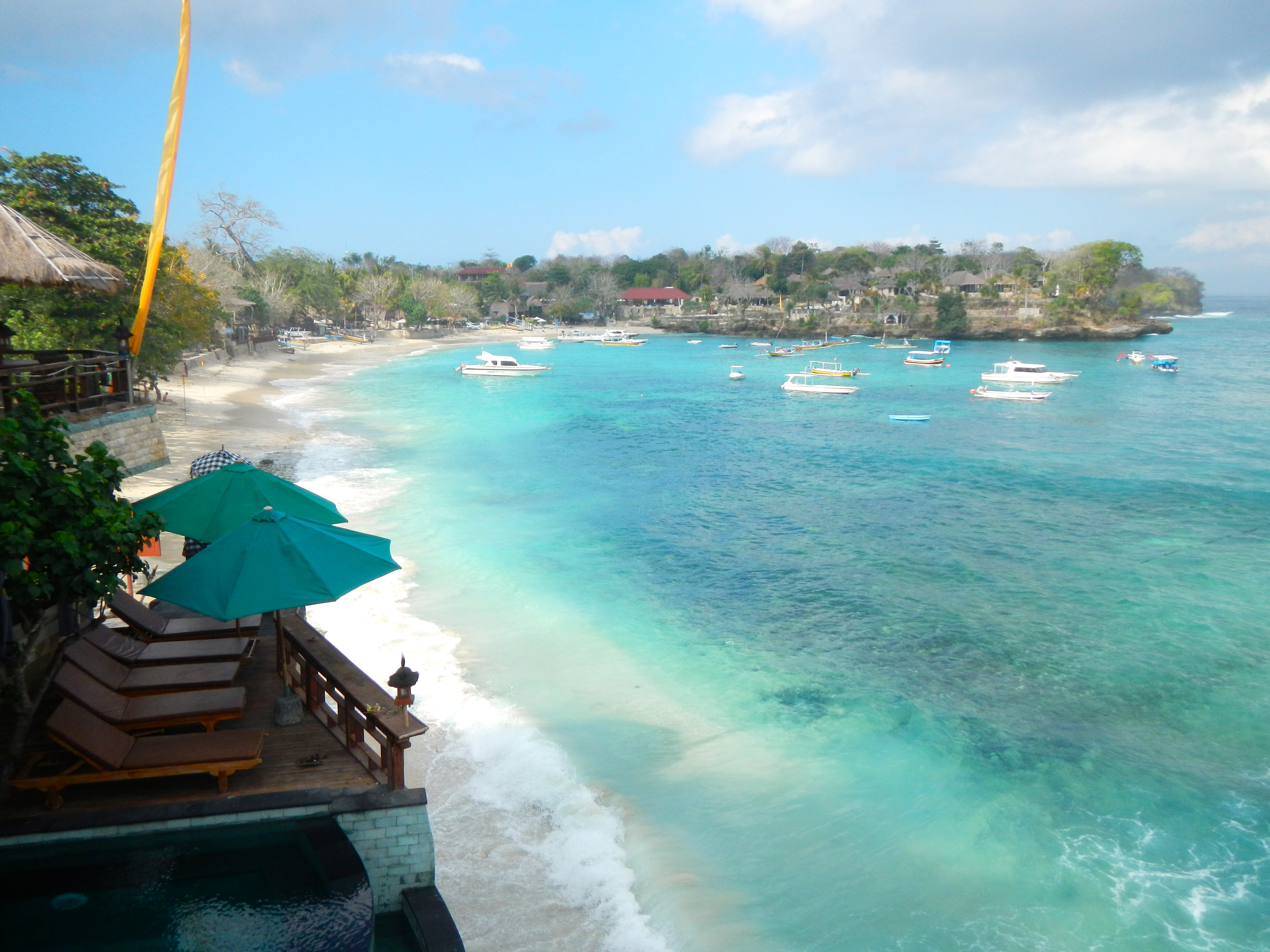
- From top, left to right: Blue Lagoon, Aqua Waters of Mushroom Bay, View of Jungutbatu village showing Mount Agung in the background, Reefs at Nusa Lembongan, and Mushroom Beach.

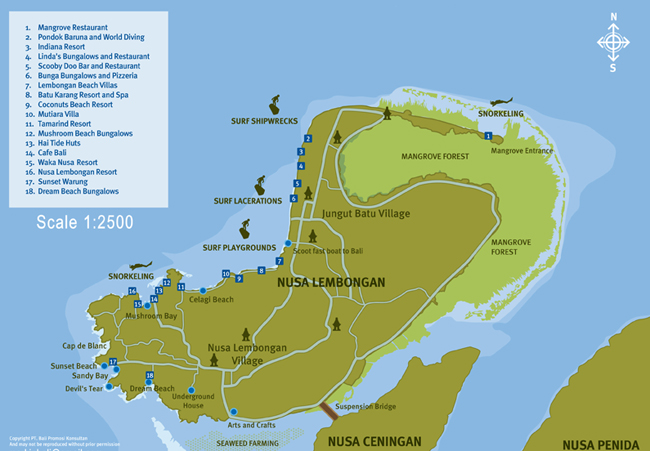

- Location within Bali

Geography
- Location: Southeast Asia
- Coordinates: 8.681767°S 115.451117°E
- Archipelago: Lesser Sunda Islands
- Area: 8.6875 km^{2} (3.3543 sq mi)

Administration
- Indonesia
- Province: Bali
- Regency: Klungkung Regency
- District: Nusa Penida
- Largest settlement: Lembongan (pop. 4.397)

Demographics
- Population: 5,000
- Languages: Balinese, Indonesian
- Ethnic groups: Balinese and others

Nusa Lembongan (Balinese: ᬦᬸᬲᬮ᭄ᬮᭂᬫ᭄ᬩᭀᬗᬦ᭄, romanized: nusa lĕmbongan) is an island located southeast of Bali, Indonesia. It is part of a group of three islands that make up the Nusa Penida District in Klungkung Regency, of which it is the most famous of the three islands of Nusa Penida, Nusa Lembongan, and Nusa Ceningan - known together as the "Nusa Islands". This island group, in turn, is part of the Lesser Sunda Islands.

== Administration ==
Administratively, the island is part of the Nusa Penida district of Klungkung Regency and is divided into 2 villages, namely Jungutbatu village which administratively occupies the northern part of the island and Lembongan village which administratively occupies the southern part of the island and the entire island of Nusa Ceningan. Nusa Lembongan is one of three small offshore islands that make up this district, the others being Nusa Penida and Nusa Ceningan. Nusa Lembongan has the vast majority of the tourist infrastructure within the district and is the most popular destination for visitors to the Nusa Islands as it has the most accommodation and dining options for travellers from Bali and Lombok.

== Geography ==
Nusa Lembongan is approximately 8 square kilometres in area with a permanent population estimated at 5,000. Twelve kilometres of the Badung Strait separates Nusa Lembongan from Bali Island. The island is surrounded by coral reefs with white sand beaches and low limestone cliffs. Nusa Lembongan is separated from Nusa Ceningan by a shallow estuarine channel which is difficult to navigate at low tide. There are no permanent waterways on Nusa Lembongan. There is a suspension bridge linking Nusa Lembongan and Nusa Ceningan which takes foot and motorbike traffic only.

There are three main villages on the island. Jungut Batu and Mushroom Bay are the centres of the tourist-based industry and activities on the island whilst much of the permanent local population resides in Lembongan Village.

To the east, the Lombok Strait separates the three islands from Lombok and marks the biogeographical division between the fauna of the Indomalayan realm and the distinctly different fauna of Australasia. The transition is known as the Wallace Line, named after Alfred Russel Wallace, who first proposed a transition zone between these two major biomes.

The northeastern side of the island is flanked by a relatively large area of mangroves totaling some 212 hectares.

Nusa Lembongan is served by regular direct speed-boat services, mostly from the east-coast Bali resort town of Sanur. Crossing time is approximately 30 minutes and services run at regular intervals during daylight hours. Larger cargo boats also run daily from the Bali port town of Padang Bai.

The island is populated by very few cars. Its main source of transportation is by scooters and foot, due to the small size of the island.

== Local economy ==
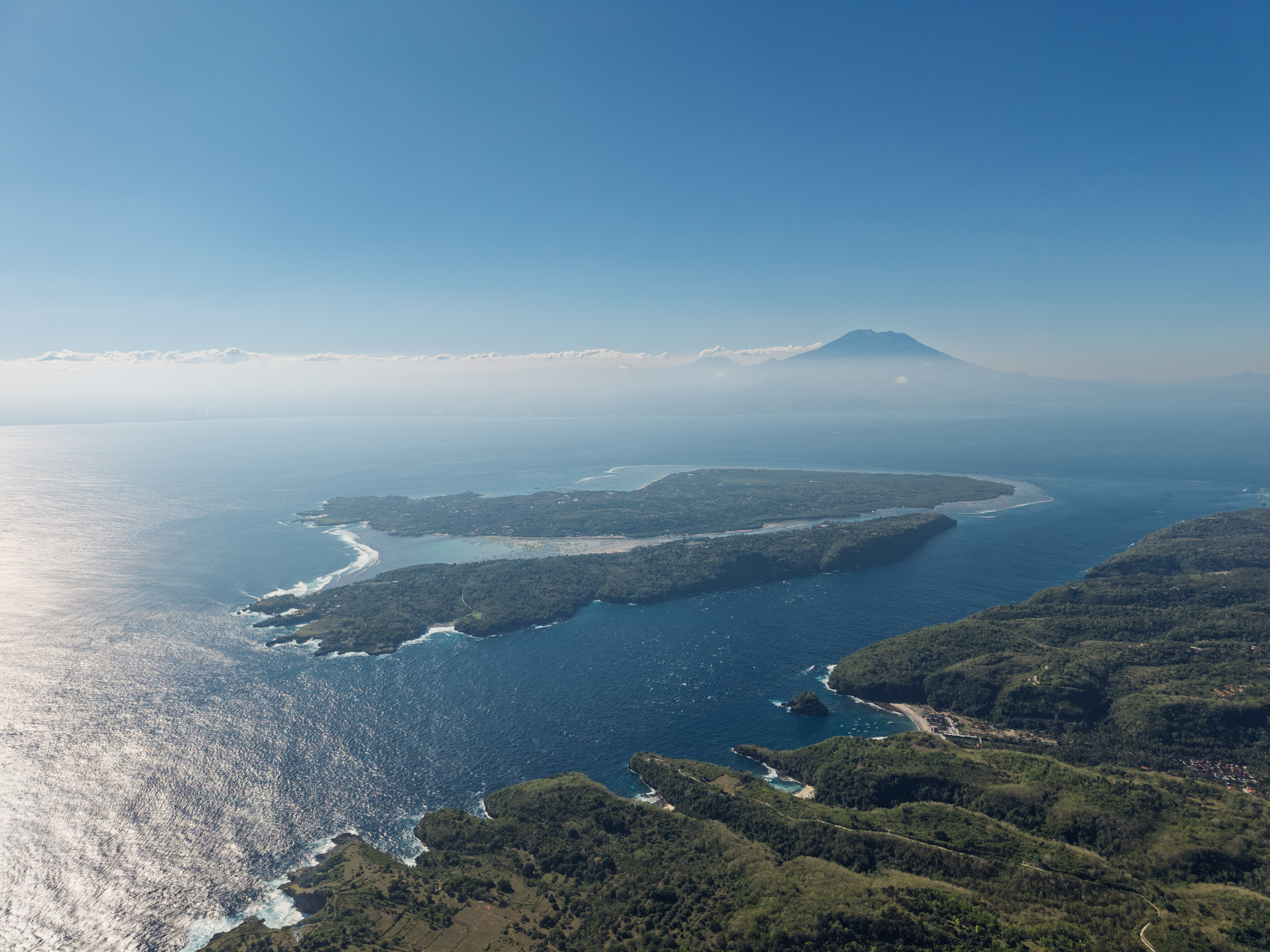
Nusa Lembongan, and Nusa Ceningan from Nusa Penida

The economy is primarily based on tourism and Nusa Lembongan is the only one of the three neighbouring islands to have significant tourism infrastructure. Nusa Lembongan is particularly well known as a world-class surfing destination, with famous surf breaks including Shipwrecks, Lacerations & Playgrounds. The island is also known for its surrounding world-class scuba diving and snorkeling on the coral reefs. There is also subsistence agriculture and fishing on the island, and a seaweed farming micro-industry until as recently as 2015 when due to tourism and pollution it became unviable. Following the COVID-19 pandemic and subsequent lag in tourism, seaweed farms were rebuilt as locals returned to the practice in 2020-2021.

== Conservation ==
Marine conservation is considered extremely important to sustaining future levels of tourism on the island and in February 2009, a local NGO from Nusa Lembongan, facilitated by The Nature Conservancy Coral Triangle Center, opened a community centre on Nusa Lembongan. The waters around Nusa Lembongan and Nusa Penida have at least 247 species of coral and 562 species of reef fish.

Other conservation initiatives include a release programme of vulnerable olive ridley turtles from Sunset Beach on the southwestern coast.

== Connection to Nusa Ceningan ==
It is connected to Nusa Ceningan Island through a narrow suspension bridge which was opened in 2017. This replaced the older wooden bridge which collapsed during a religious procession in 2016, killing eight people.

== Gallery ==
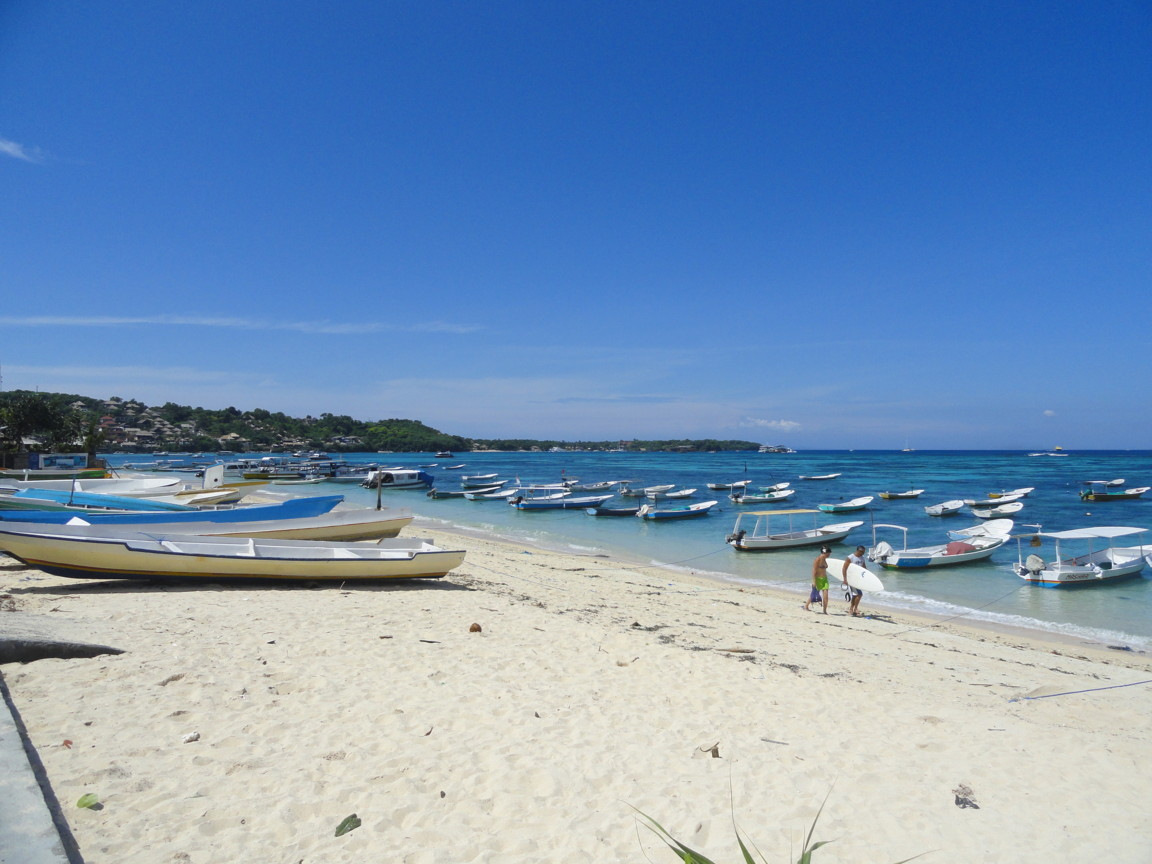
View of Jungut Batu Beach from the south side

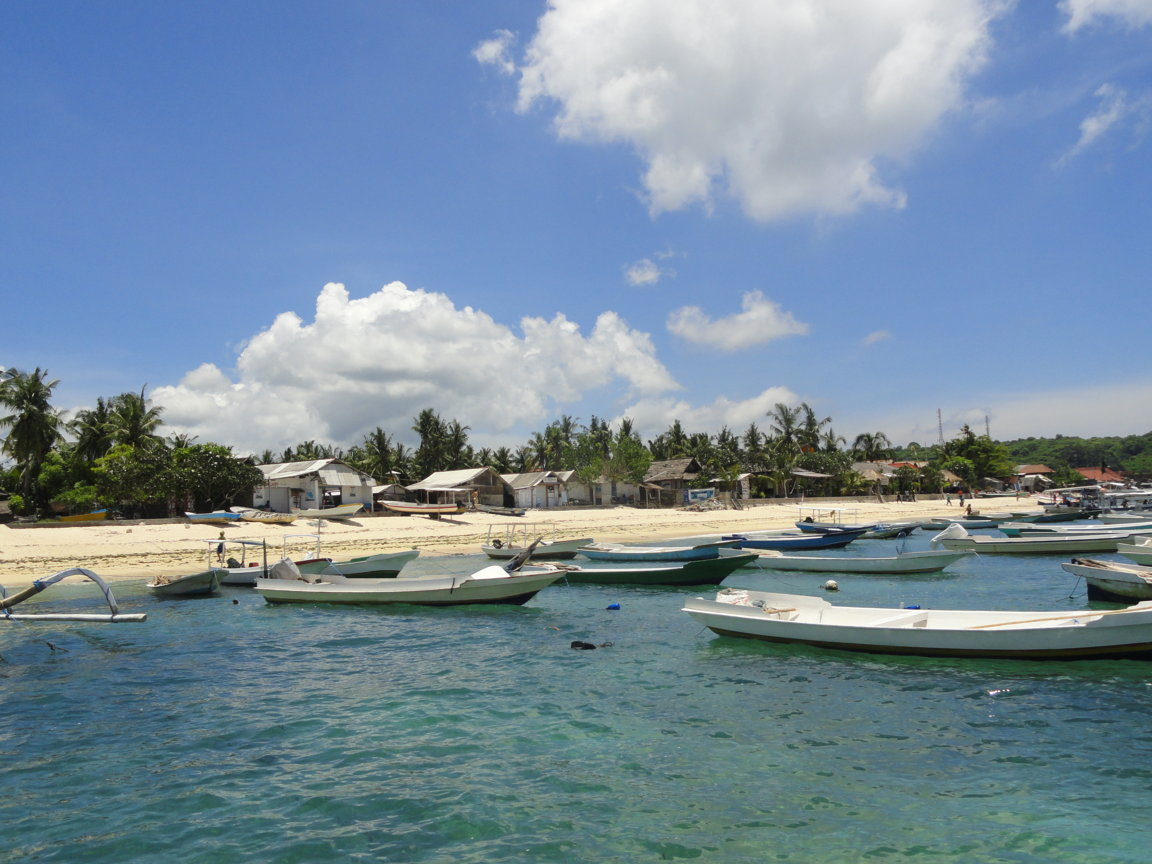
View of Jungut Batu Beach from the north side

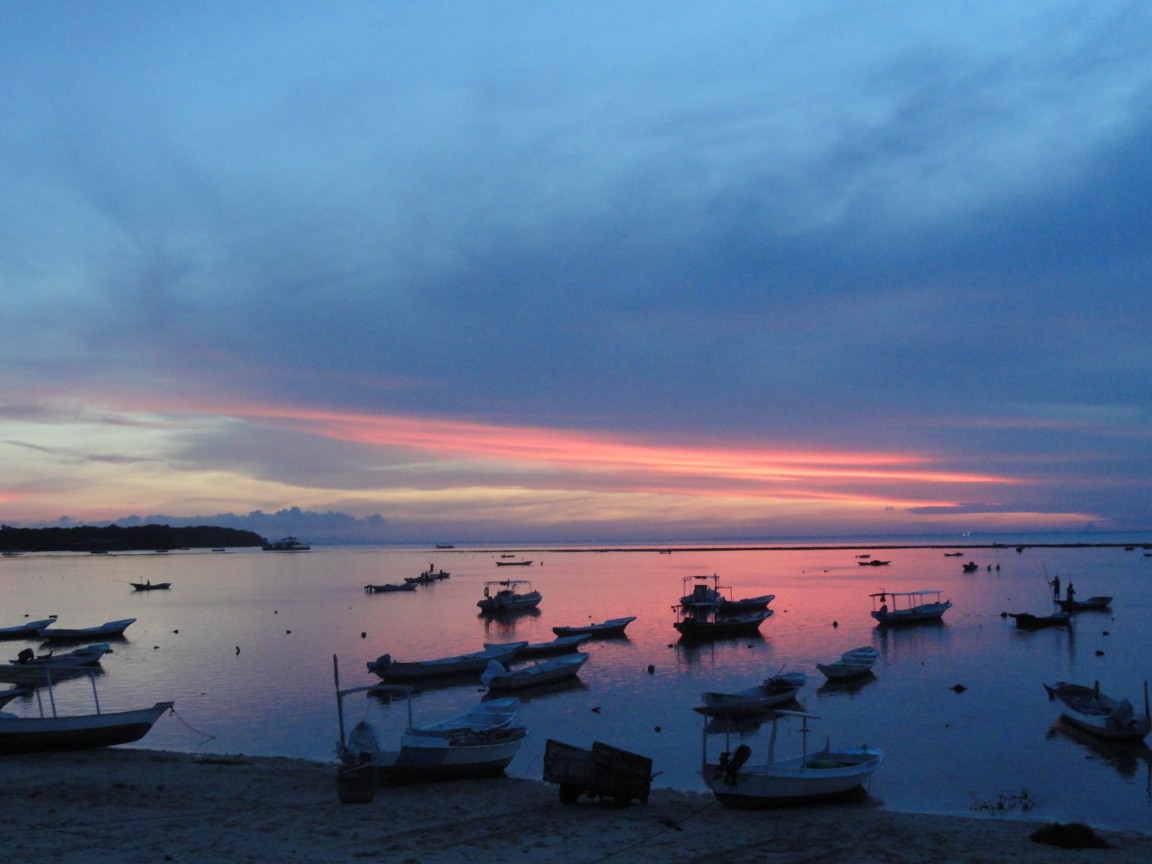
Sunset over Jungut Batu

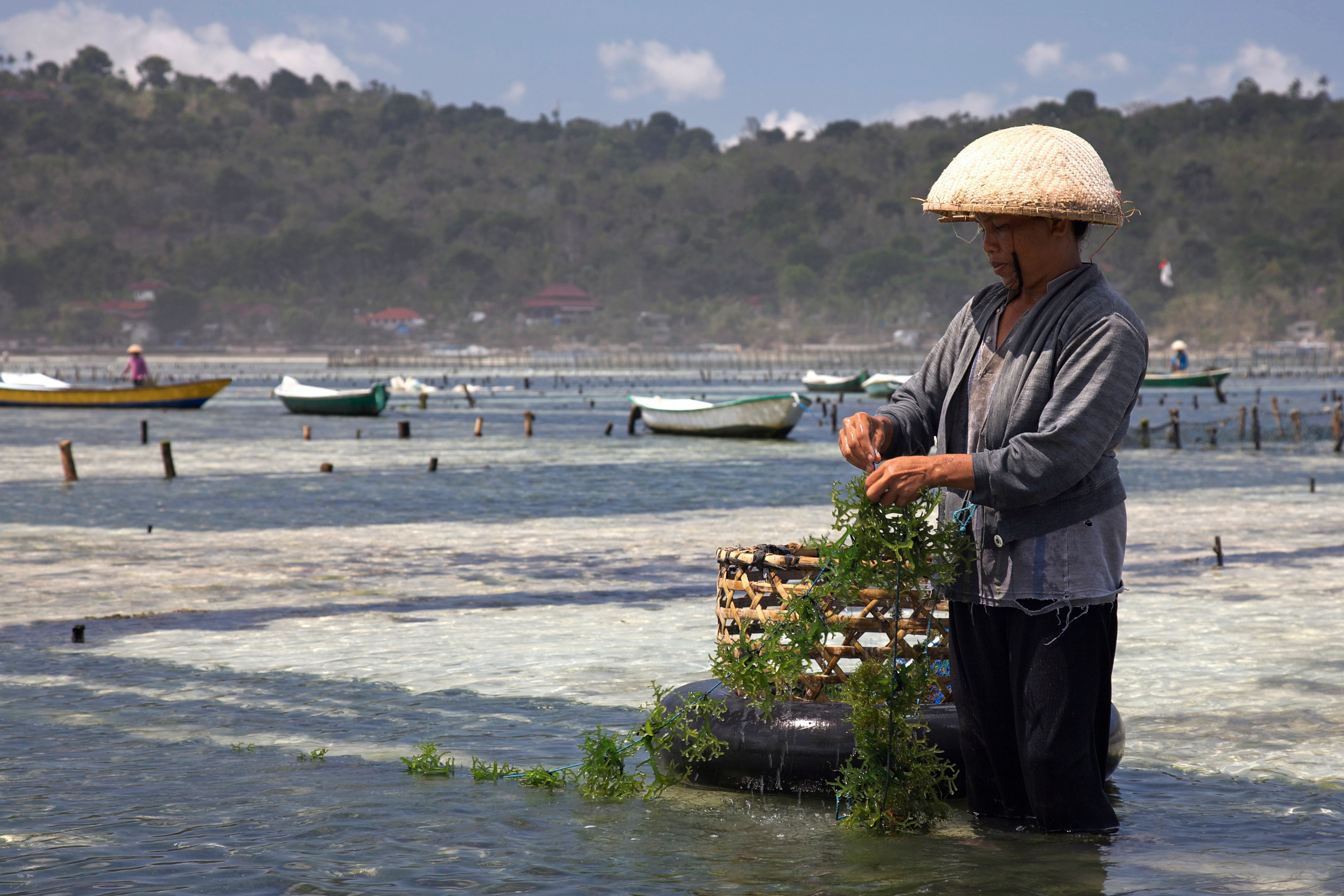
Seaweed farming

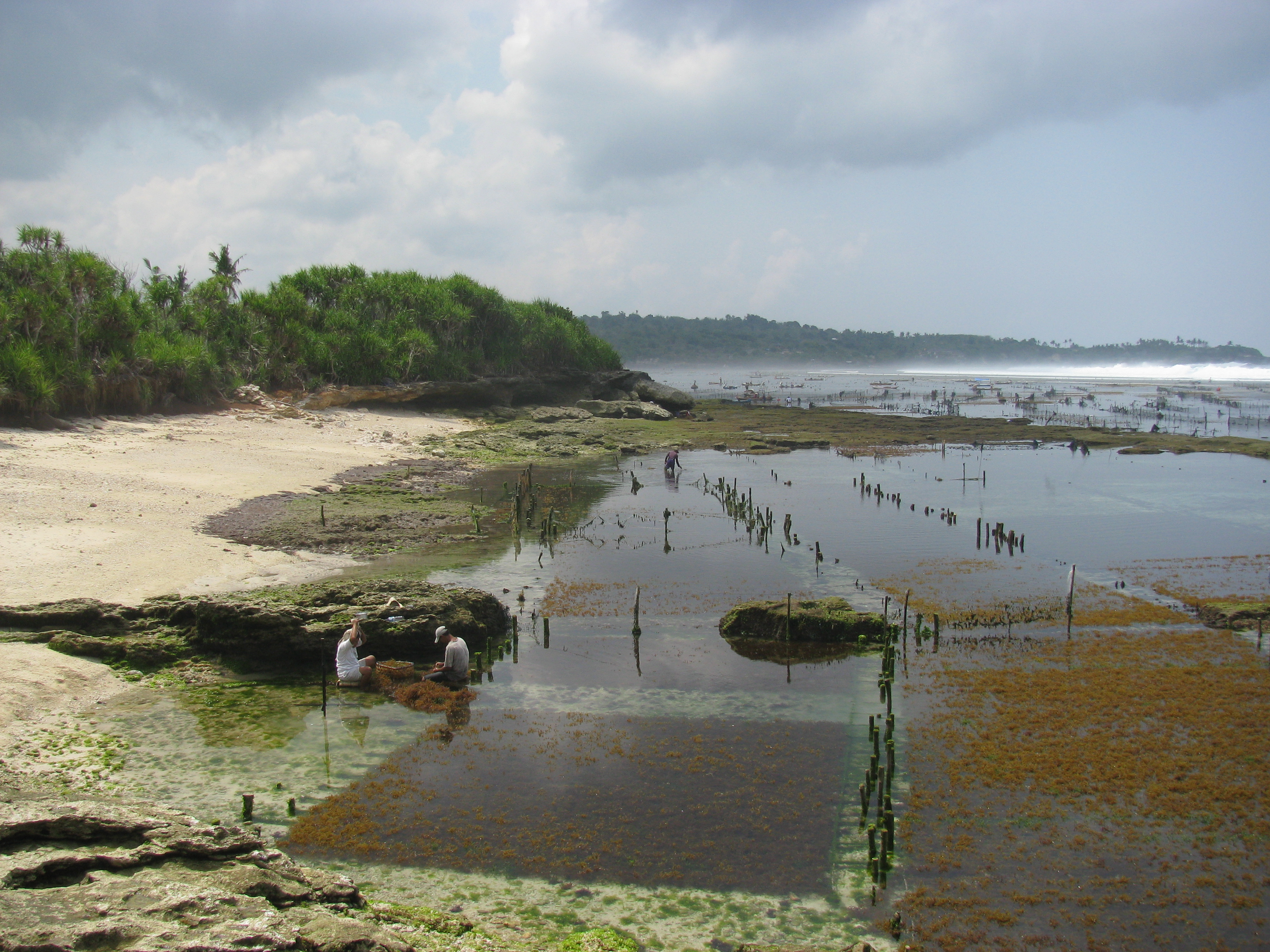
Seaweed farms on Nusa Lembongan (2009)

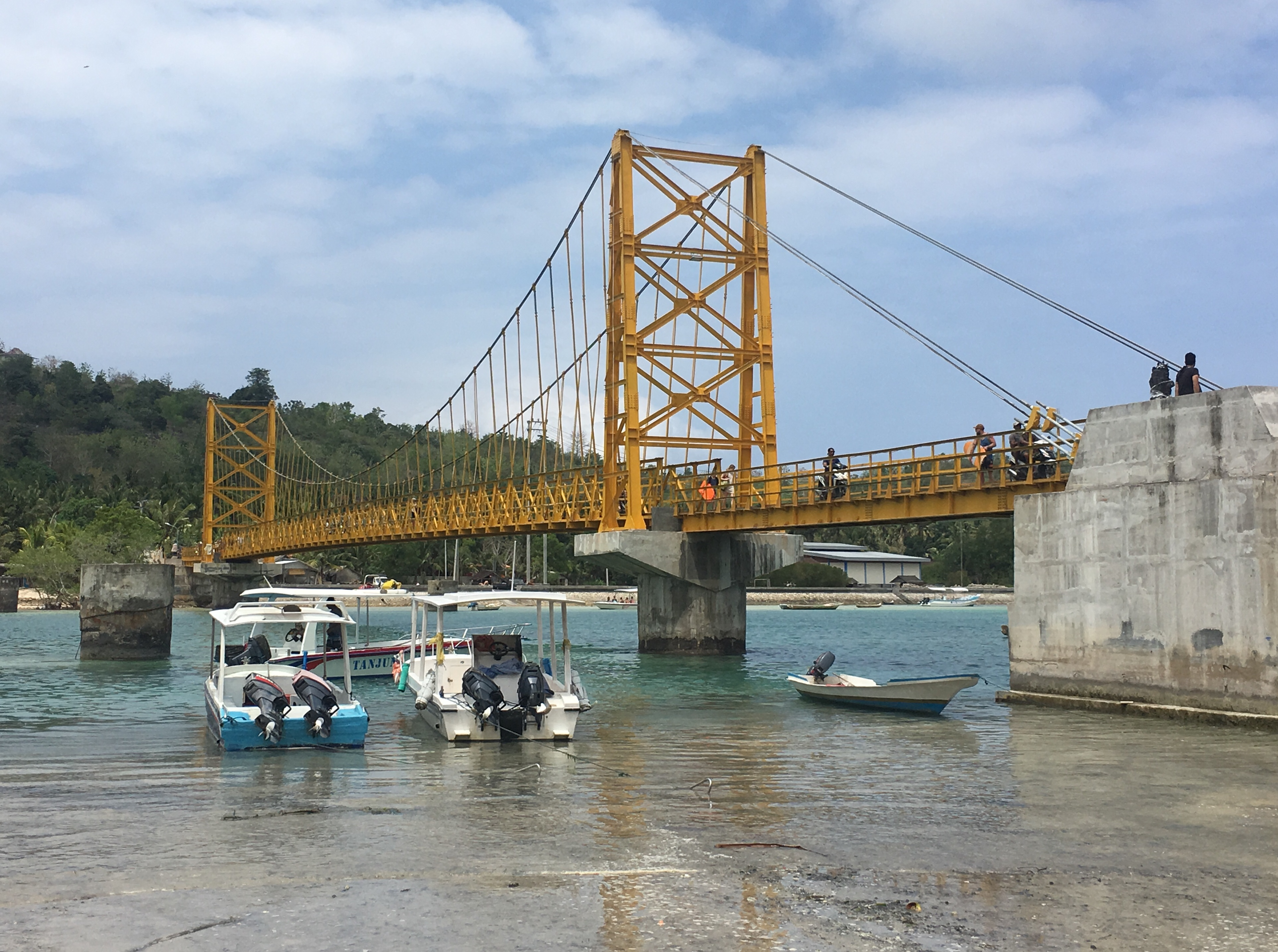
The yellow iron bridge connecting the island to Nusa Ceningan was opened in 2017

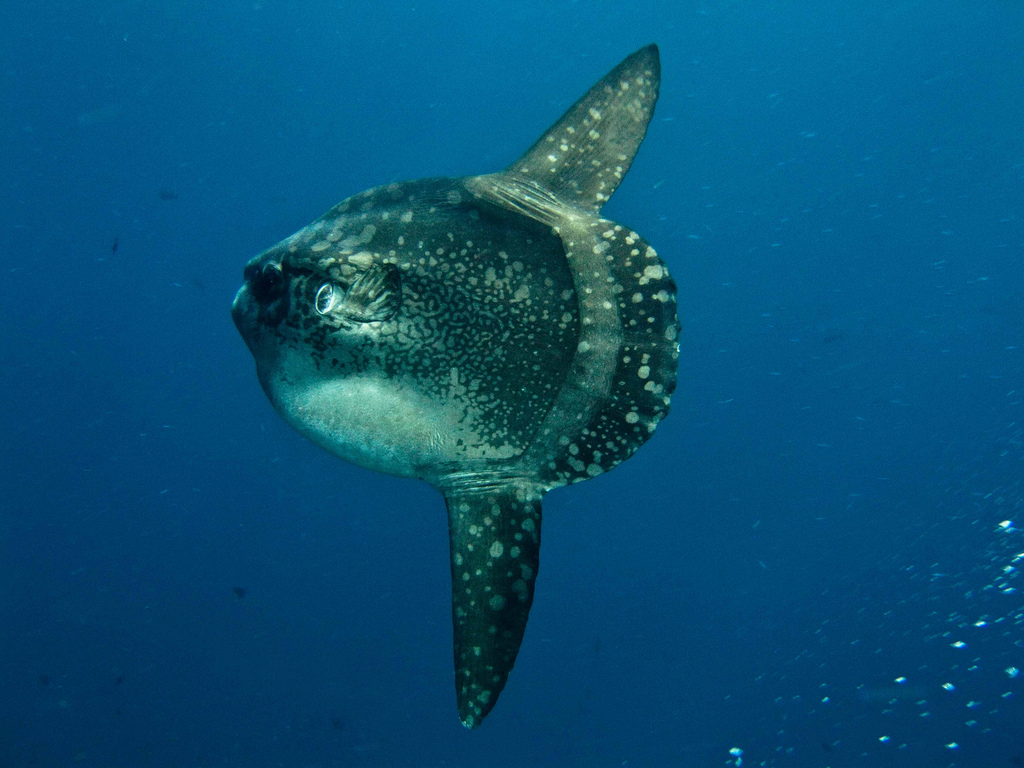
Oceanic sunfish in the waters off Nusa Lembongan

== See also ==
- List of islands in Indonesia
- Nusa Penida
- Nusa Ceningan
- Bali
