= Nusa Ceningan =

Island in Indonesia

Native name: ᬦᬸᬲᬘᭂᬦᬶᬗᬦ᭄
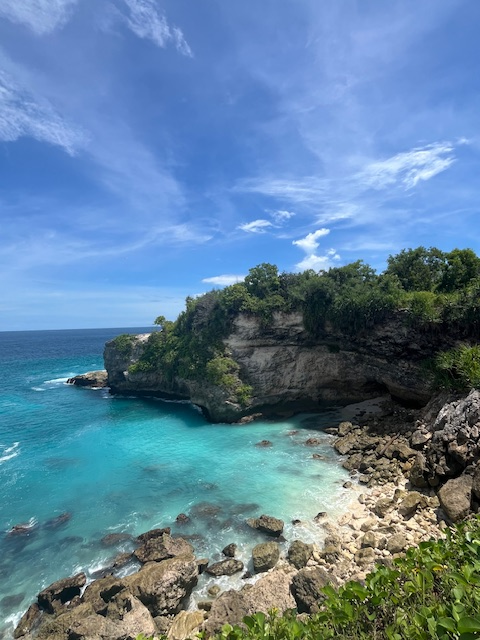
- Ceningan
- Interactive map of Nusa Ceningan

Geography
- Location: Southeast Asia
- Archipelago: Lesser Sunda Islands
- Area: 3.9 km^{2} (1.5 sq mi)

Administration
- Indonesia
- Province: Bali
- Regency: Klungkung Regency
- District: Nusa Penida

Demographics
- Population: 1,523
- Languages: Balinese, Indonesian
- Ethnic groups: Balinese and others

Nusa Ceningan (Balinese: ᬦᬸᬲᬘᭂᬦᬶᬗᬦ᭄, romanized: nusa cĕningan; Indonesian pronounced [ˌnusa t͡ʃəˈniŋan]) is a small island located in Nusa Penida District, Klungkung Regency, Bali, Indonesia; between Nusa Lembongan to the north-west and Nusa Penida to the south-east and south-east. All three islands are south-east of mainland Bali and lie on the southern side of the Strait of Badung. Since none of the three islands have an airport, a boat or ferry is required to get to Nusa Ceningan.

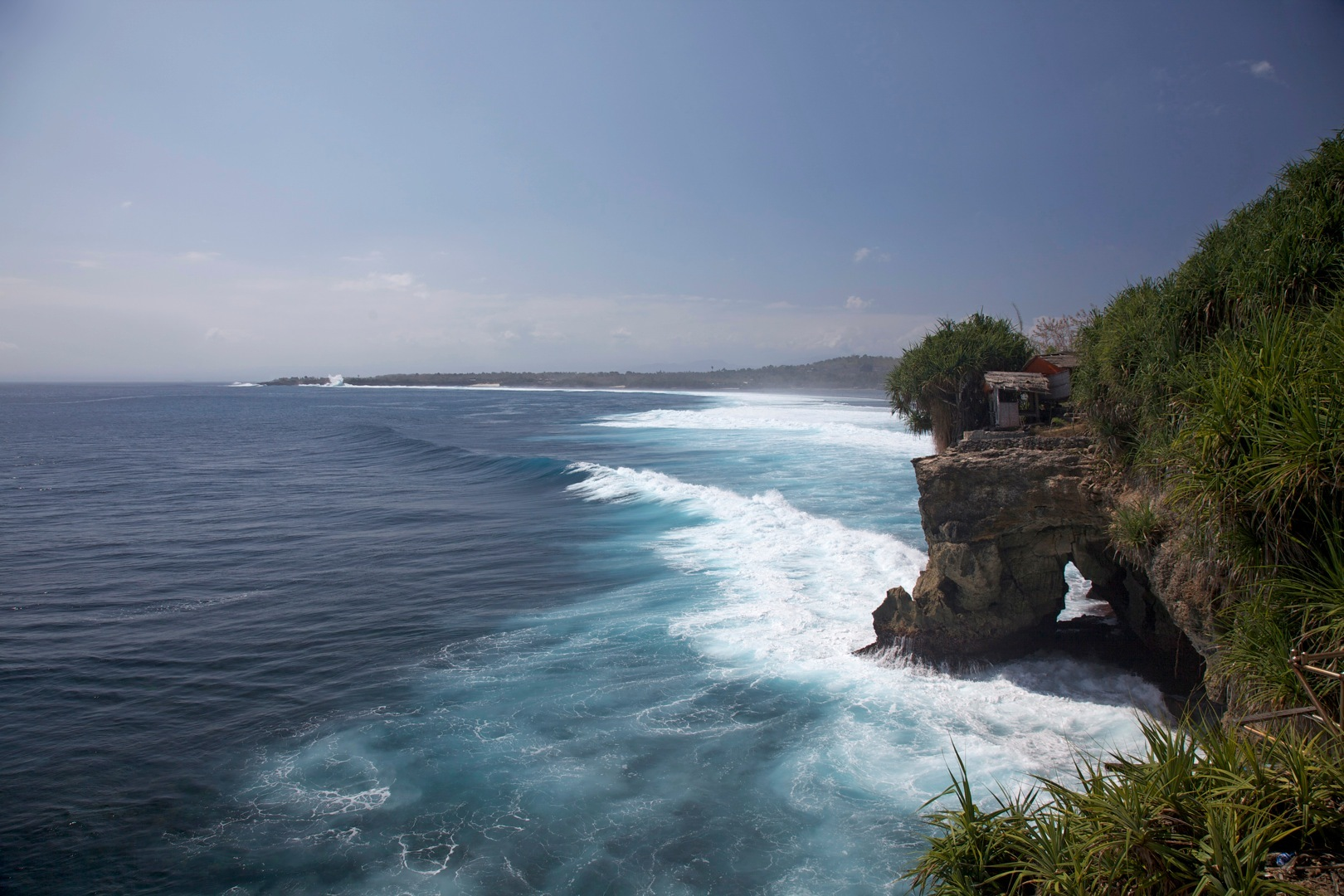
Nusa Ceningan, 2009.

There is a notable surf break off Nusa Ceningan which attracts some surfers away from the more crowded breaks on Nusa Lembongan.

The island offers some scenic roads and paths, and the westward views back over Nusa Lembongan to Bali are impressive. Viewing the sunset over Bali from the central Ceningan ridge is very much worth the effort. The estuarine channel between Lembongan and Ceningan is home to many seaweed farms and pristine mangrove forests.

== Administration ==
Administratively, Nusa Ceningan is a part of the territory of Lembongan Village in the Nusa Penida District of Klungkung Regency located in the southeast of Bali Province in Indonesia. It consists of two hamlets (now administrative hamlets), namely Ceningan Kawan hamlet and Ceningan Kangin hamlet, with a population of 1,523 people, spread across 6 customary hamlets, namely Parangan Tengah, Ambentiying, Ceningan Tengah, Anggrek, Batumelawang and Gili Mekarnadi customary hamlets.

== Geography ==
The island is 3.9 km long and 1.1 km wide, with an area of 3 square kilometers. It is located 15 km from Bali and 1 km from Nusa Penida. It is accessible by boat from Sanur or by the suspension bridge connecting it to Nusa Lembongan, which is only accessible by pedestrians and two-wheelers. The shallow channel separating the two small islands is difficult to navigate at low tide.

To the east, the Lombok Strait separates the three islands from Lombok and marks the biogeographic division between the fauna of the Indomalayan and Australasian. The transition is known as the Wallace Line, after Alfred Russel Wallace, who was the first to propose a transition between these two major biomes.

== Activities ==
The island is a nesting area for birds. It contains caves and historic pura (temples). At the easternmost end there is Pura Batu Banglas/Goa Raja, in the north Pura Bakung, in the south Pura Tirta Dalem Buhu, in the west Pura Batumelawang and in the centre is Pura Tri Adi Sakti, among others.

Seaweed farming, which began in the mid-1980s, is a major source of employment.

== Connection to Nusa Lembongan ==
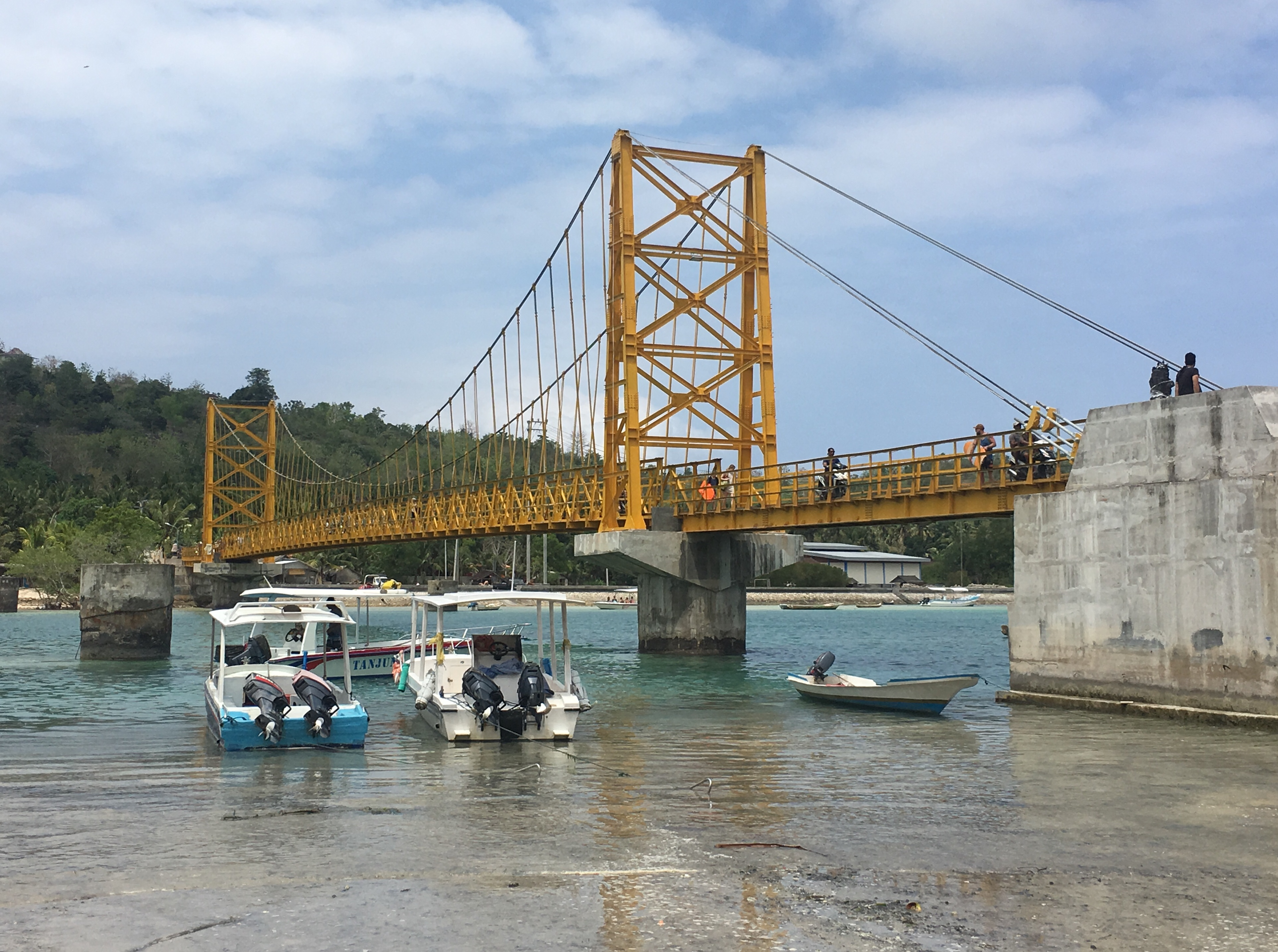
Nusa Lembongan–Nusa Ceningan bridge

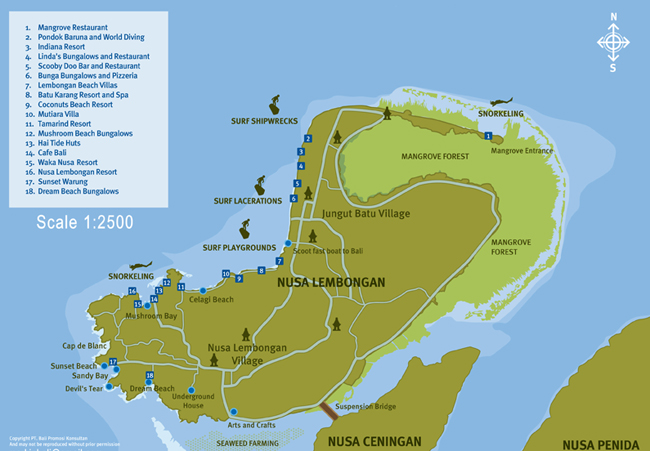
Nusa Lembongan and Nusa Ceningan

It is connected to Nusa Lembongan Island by a narrow suspension bridge which opened in 2017. It replaced the previous wooden bridge which collapsed in 2016 during a religious procession, killing eight people.

== Tourism ==
Nusa Ceningan has been slowly growing in popularity since 2009. A key tourist attraction is the Mahana cliff jump, which is located on the southwestern side of Nusa Ceningan at Mahana Point Bar. The bar manages two diving platforms at 5 and 13 meters. Jumping is only permitted when the tide is high enough.

== See also ==
- List of islands in Indonesia
- Nusa Lembongan
- Nusa Penida
- Bali
