= Marga, Tabanan =

District in Tabanan Regency, Bali Province, Indonesia

Coordinates: 8°31′21.45″S 115°10′15.78″E

Location within Tabanan and Bali

Marga (Balinese: ᬫᬃᬕ), also known as Margarana (Balinese: ᬫᬃᬕᬭᬦ) is a exclave and landlocked district (kecamatan) of the Tabanan Regency of Bali, Indonesia.

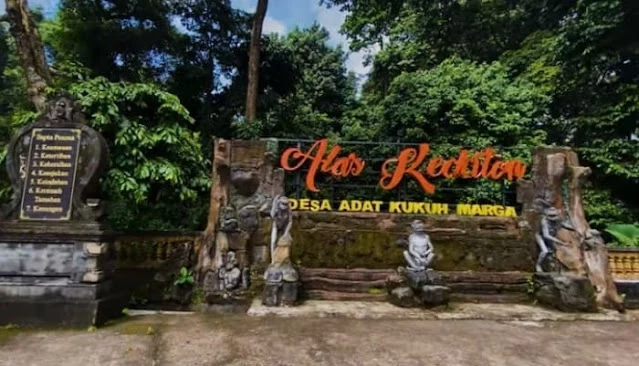
Alas Kedaton

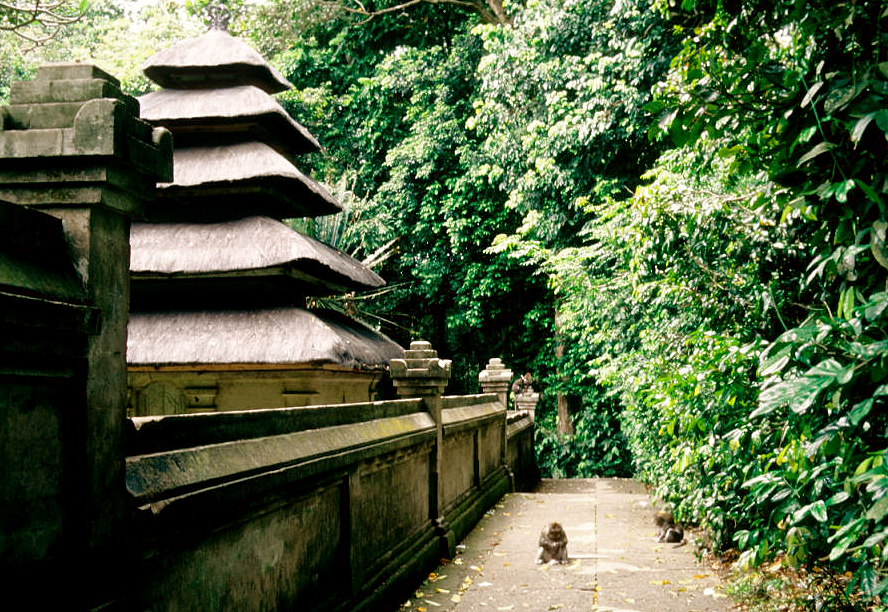
Alas Kedaton Temple

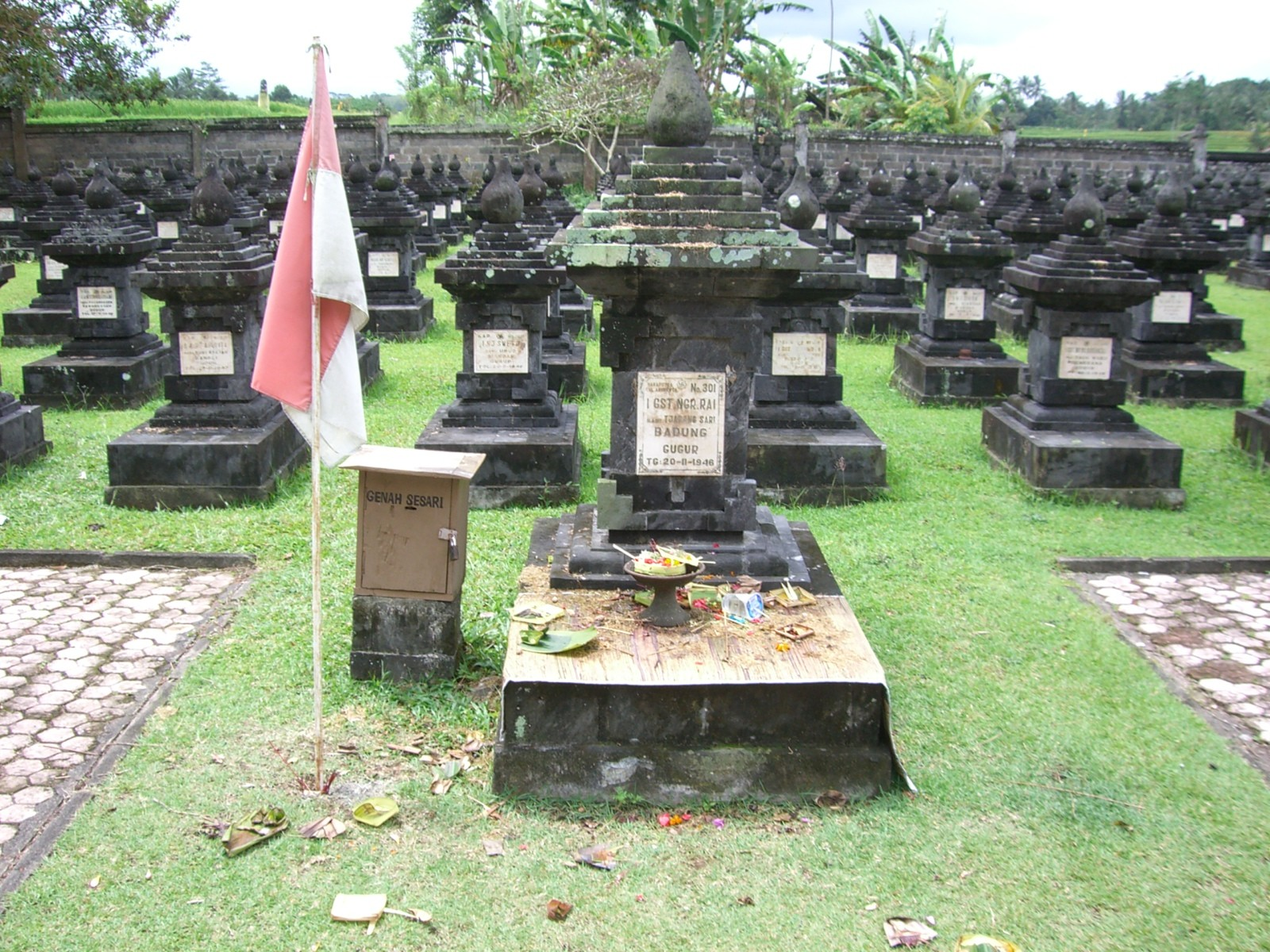
Heroes' graves in Taman Pujaan Bangsa Margarana

It is the location of the Battle of Margarana, where Indonesian National Hero I Gusti Ngurah Rai was killed by Dutch forces during the Indonesian Revolution. This battle, in which 96 Indonesians were killed, has been characterized by Balinese writers as a Puputan, such as those of 1906–08.

== History ==
It is said that during his journey, a descendant of Sri Arya Sentong, named Ki Gusti Ngurah Pacung, conducted spiritual activities from Nusa Penida, where he built a temple complex, starting from Alas Kedaton, Pura Puser Tasik, to Pucak Padang Dawa. He also built a temple as a place of rule, later named Alas Urat Mara, where "Urat" means strength and "Mara" means new. This is where a new power emerged, and his village was named Taman Lebah. The name Urat Mara was later changed to Marga after a split in Puri Perean.

Marga has tourist attractions including Taman Pujaan Bangsa Margarana and Alas Kedaton.

== Geography ==
=== Boundaries ===
The administrative boundaries of Marga District are: north=Baturiti District|east=Mengwi District, Badung Regency and Abiansemal District, Badung Regency|south=Kediri District, Tabanan Regency|west=Penebel District, Tabanan Regency and Tabanan District Tabanan]], Tabanan Regency |northwest=Penebel District, Tabanan Regency|southwest=Kediri District, Tabanan Regency

== Government ==
=== Administrative Division ===
Marga District consists of 16 villages. Cau Belayu Village is the largest village, covering 4.31 km2, while Batannyuh Village is the smallest, covering 1.35 km2.

Banjar (Bali) is an administrative area in Bali Province under the sub-district or village level. Banjars are divided into two types based on their function:

- Banjar Dinas handles administrative matters, such as issuing ID cards (KTP), the Village Fund (Kipem), and regulates the implementation of government programs, such as Integrated Health Posts (Posyandu), Family Welfare Movement (PKK), and voting activities in regional and presidential elections.
- The Customary Village (Banjar Adat) manages matters related to customary activities, such as scheduling traditional ceremonies (marriages, funerals), and organizing traditional ritual arts performances.

Marga District is divided into 16 villages, namely:

Village Data in Marga District 2023
No.	Village						
No.	Village Officials				Customary Village	Banjar	
No.	Name	Village Head	Total Area (km^{2})	Percentage of District Area (%)	Customary Village	Banjar Dinas	Banjar Adat
1.	Marga	Ray Darmawan, ST	2.62	5.85%		4	
2.	Dajan Puri	I Made Rasma, SH.MH	1.73	3.86%		4	
3.	Dauh Puri	I Wayan Wiryanata	2.23	4.98%		2	
4.	Petiga	I Wayan Sugita	2.82	6.30%		3	
5.	Show	I Nyoman Sudiarsana	4.23	9.44%		9	
6.	Wound	I Putu Gunarsa Wiranjaya	2.09	4.67%		4	
7.	Old	I Wayan Budi Arta Putra	3.86	8.62%		3	
8.	New	I Made Suarjana	3.76	8.39%		4	
9.	Selanbawak	I Made Merta	2.92	6.52%		5	
10.	Kuwum	I Putu Yoga Andika, ST	2.77	6.18%		5	
11.	Batannyuh	I Nyoman Witama	1.35	3.01%		4	
12.	Kukuh	I Made Sugianto	3.71	8.28%		8	
13.	Tegaljadi	I Made Oka Witarmana	3.25	5.25%		3	
14.	Peken Belayu	I Gusti Made Darmayasa	2.27	5.07%		5	
15.	Sweep	I Gede Putu Suarta, SE	1.77	3.95%		4	
16.	Cau Belayu	I Putu Eka Jayantara	4.31	9.62%		4	
District. Clan			54.78	100%		71	

== Demographics ==
Based on the 2010 BPS census, the population of Marga District was 40,353. Based on BPS projections for 2016, the population could reach 41,670, consisting of 20,540 males and 21,130 females. Meanwhile, according to data from the Ministry of Home Affairs, as of 2017, the population of Marga District had reached 44,768. By 2023, the population will reach 44,759, according to BPS.

Population Data in Marga District Marga in 2023
NO	Village	Gender			Population Percentage	Population Density (Per km2)	Religion									
NO	Village	Male	Female	Number of People	Population Percentage	Population Density (Per km2)	Hindu		Protestant Christian		Catholic Christian		Islam		Buddhist	
NO	Village	Male	Female	Number of People	Population Percentage	Population Density (Per km2)	Number of People	Number of Places of Worship	Number of People	Number of Places of Worship	Number of People	Number of Places of Worship	Number of People	Number of Places of Worship	Number of People	Number of Places of Worship
1.	Tegaljadi	1,171	1,183	2,354	5.26%	1,002		41								
2.	Sturdy	2,894	2,931	5,825	13.01%	1,570		58								
3.	Beringkit Belayu	1,112	1,130	2,242	5.01%	1,267		14								
4.	Belayu Village	1,531	1,560	3,091	6.91%	1,362		7								
5.	Batannyuh	1,258	1,290	2,548	5.69%	1,887		11								
6.	Kuwum	1,550	1,513	3,063	6.84%	1,106		21								
7.	Cau Belayu	1,517	1,558	3,075	6.87%	713		23								
8.	Selanbawak	1,830	1,859	3,689	8.24%	1,263		24								
9.	Genus	1,607	1,614	3,221	7.20%	1,229		12								
10.	Petiga	944	943	1,887	4.22%	669		10								
11.	Old	1,346	1,380	2,726	6.09%	706		18								
12.	Payangan	1,679	1,772	3,451	7.71%	816		21								
13.	Dauh Puri	1,031	1,086	2,117	4.73%	949		13								
14.	Dajan Puri	1,027	990	2,017	4.51%	1,166		14								
15.	Geluntung	719	732	1,451	3.24%	694		7								
16.	New	1,016	986	2,002	4.47%	532		23								
Marga District		22,232	22,527	44,759	100%	817		317								

== Public Facilities ==
=== Education ===
Educational facilities and infrastructure in Marga in 2016 included 21 kindergartens, 34 elementary schools, 4 junior high schools, 1 senior high school, and 1 vocational high school. In Marga there are also 2 health centers, 6 auxiliary health centers, and 71 integrated health posts. In 2023, Marga District will have 38 formal education facilities consisting of 32 Elementary Schools, 4 Middle Schools, and 2 High Schools.

=== Health ===
For health facilities, Marga District has one hospital, one community health center with inpatient care, and two pharmacies.

=== Facilities & Infrastructure ===
In 2021, Marga District had 16 main street lights per village powered by government electricity. In the same year, there were also five lodgings. Furthermore, Marga District has 13 cell phone towers and 78 mobile phone service operators, ensuring that all villages have at least a strong 4G/LTE signal.

== Economy ==
=== Agriculture ===
Annual fruit production includes durian, tangerine, mango, papaya, banana, starfruit, guava, mangosteen, rambutan, sapodilla, and soursop. Guava produced the highest yield at 11,432 quintals, followed by banana at 6,104 quintals. Starfruit produced the lowest yield at 156 quintals.

=== Banking, Cooperatives, & Trade ===
In 2021, there were 45 cooperatives in Marga District, consisting of 3 Village Unit Cooperatives (KUD), 2 Small Industry and Craft Cooperatives (Kopinkra), 38 Savings and Loan Cooperatives (Kospin), and 2 Other Cooperatives.

== Gallery ==
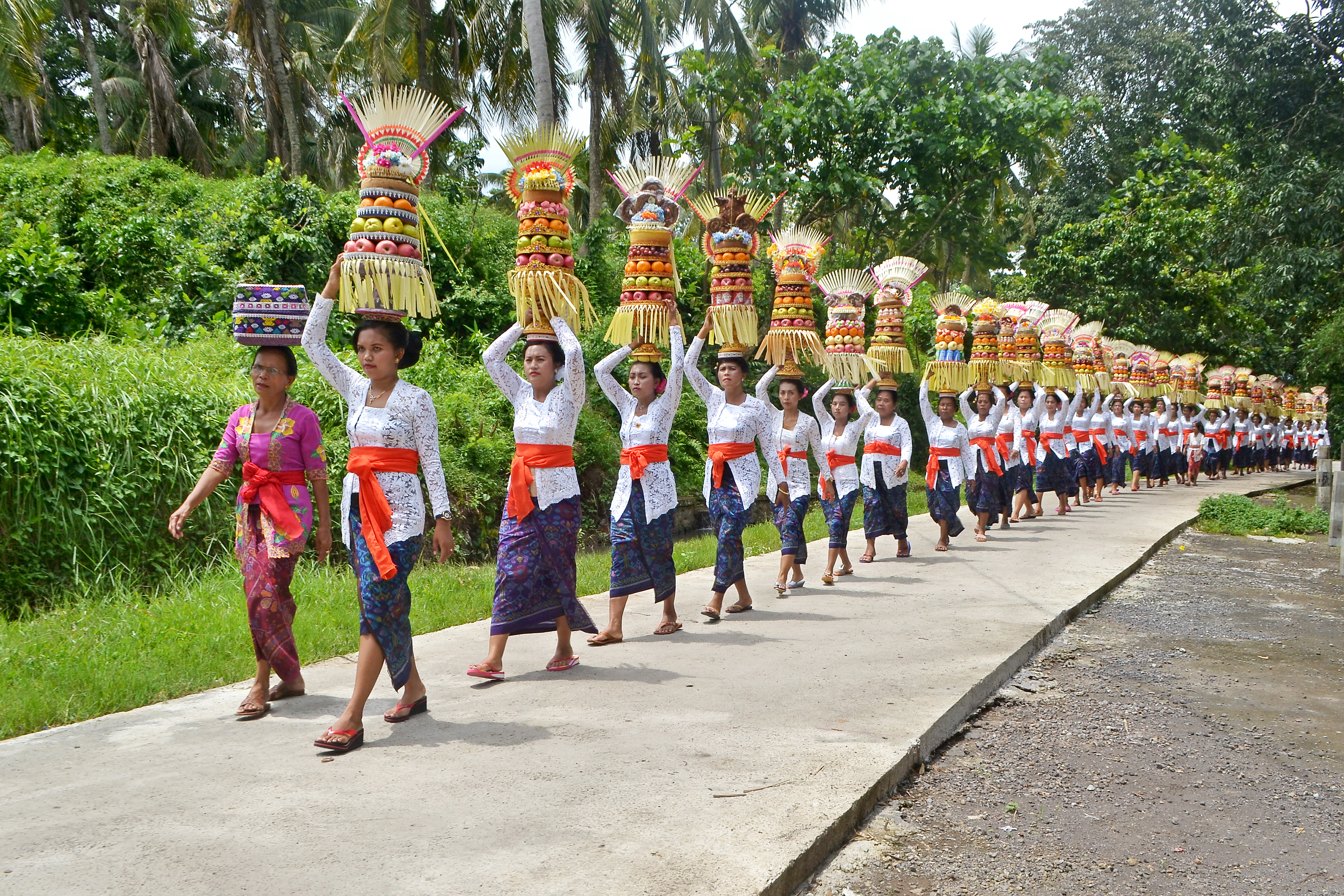
Hindu mapped tradition in Alas Kedaton

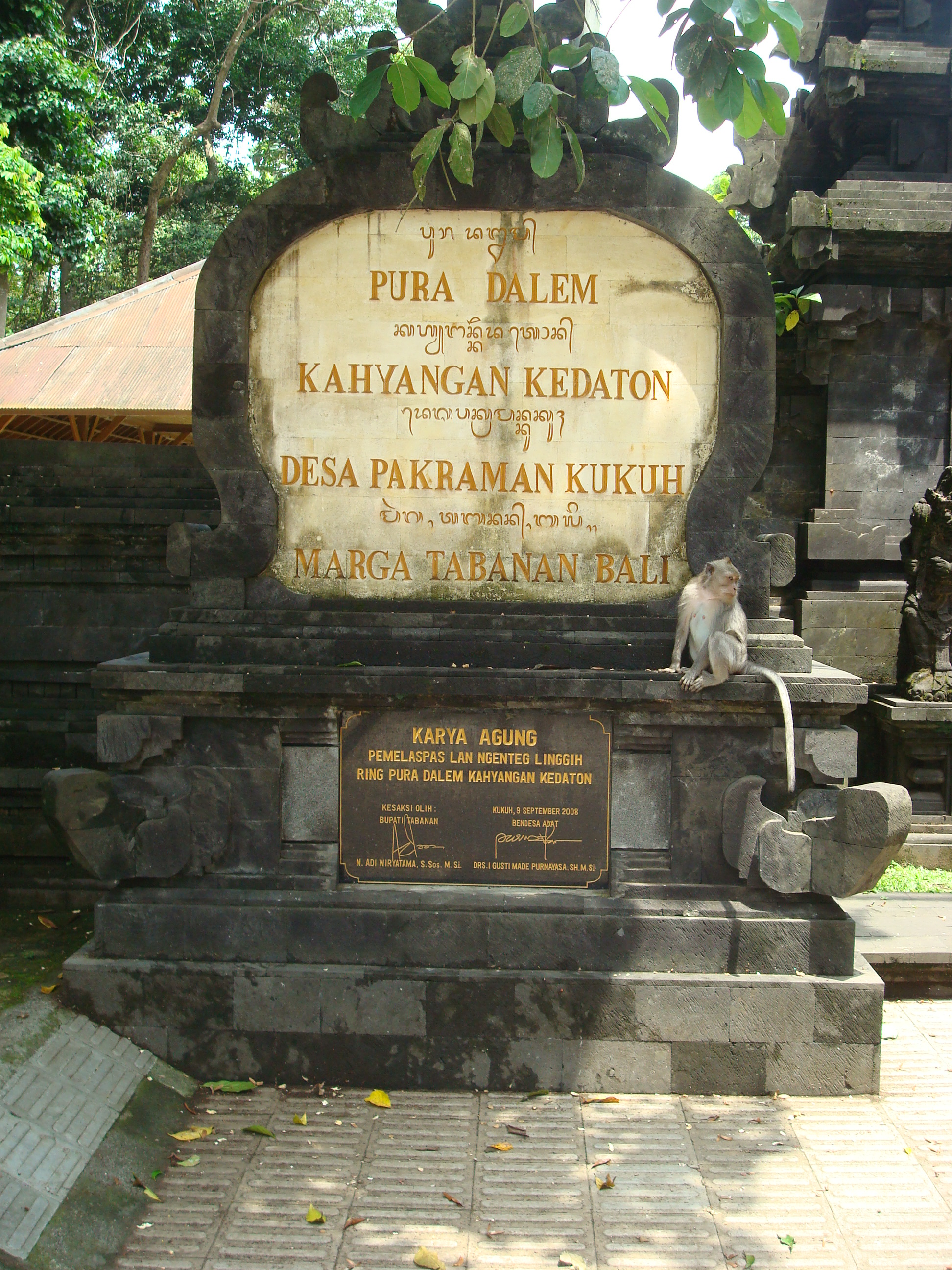
The nameplate of Alas Kedaton Temple
