= Battle of Margarana =

1946 battle in Bali, Indonesia

- Part of the Indonesian National Revolution
Date	20 November 1946
Location	Marga, Bali, Indonesia
Result	Dutch pyrrhic victory
Territorial changes	Denpasar Conference: State of East Indonesia established

Belligerents
Netherlands	Indonesia

Commanders and leaders
Lt. Colonel F. Mollinger; Capt. J.B.T König	Lt. Colonel I Gusti Ngurah Rai †

Units involved
NICA: Y-Brigade; 8 (IV) Bataljon Stoottroepen; Gajah Merah KNIL Battalion Infantry X; Gajah Merah KNIL Battalion Infantry XI; Gajah Merah KNIL Battalion Infantry XII	Ciung Wanara Battalion

Strength
2,000 soldiers 1 Bomber from Makassar	95

Casualties and losses
400 killed	Entire battalion (96 killed)

The Battle of Margarana (Balinese: ᬧᬸᬧᬸᬢᬦ᭄ ᬫᬃᬕᬭᬦ, romanized: Puputan Margarana; Dutch: Slag bij Margarana) was fought between the Netherlands Indies Civil Administration (NICA) and the recently created, rebelling Ciung Wanara Battalion that occurred in Marga, in Bali, Indonesia.

== Prelude ==
As World War II ended, the British Army landed in Bali, disarmed occupying Japanese troops, and returned to Batavia. Some Dutch KNIL battalions under Gajah Merah, however, stayed in the city. When Gajah Merah's Infantry landed, Ciung Wanara commander I Gusti Ngurah Rai went to Yogyakarta to discuss Bali's condition with the head of the Republic Indonesian Army, who placed one ALRI warship in Gilimanuk Harbour.

On 28 May 1946, I Gusti Ngurah Rai led the army's long march to East Bali. Skirmishing began at Tanah Aron on 9 July 1946, moving later to Penglipuran. The long march then resumed until they had arrived at Tabanan. On 20 July 1946, the NICA Y-Brigade first landed at Benoa.

On 11 November 1946, the battalion and defected NICA head police officer Wagimin arrived at Dangin Carik, Tabanan, planning to disarm the regency's NICA Police by the night of 18 November. On that day, the combined 300 men of platoons Barisan Banteng and Anak Banteng arrived with weapons.

== Battle ==
On 19 November, the Y-Brigade arrived at army posts in Perean, Baha, Kediri, Tabanan, Penebel, and Jatiluwih to reach Marga and block the Ciung Wanara battalion's movement. Rai knew about the plan and commanded the battalion to disband, with 95 men remaining with him to commit puputan (last stand) in battle. These remaining troops moved to Banjar Kelaci, Marga.

On the morning of 20 November 1946, KNIL troops arrived before sunrise to block the remnants of Rai's troops as planned. The battle began at 8:00 AM. At first, KNIL troops thought the battalion's defense was too strong, so they fell back.

At 12:00 PM, the Dutch troops were helped by a bomber from Makassar, and resumed the attack after the bombing. The battle ended at 5:00 PM, with 400 Dutch soldiers and the entire remaining Ciung Wanara battalion (including Rai) killed in action. NICA was commanded to bring all of the corpses to the Marga Market, but only 86 bodies were taken.

Since Rai's entire force was wiped out, including the military leadership, the Dutch forces were subsequently unopposed and were able to regain control of Bali. This may not have been possible had Ngurah Rai adopted a guerrilla strategy.

== See also ==
- Police Actions (Indonesia)
