= Nuanu Creative City =

Mixed-use development in Bali, Indonesia

- Mixed-use development
- Location in Bali, Indonesia
- Coordinates: 8°37′28″S 115°06′02″E
- Country: Indonesia
- Province: Bali
- Regency: Tabanan
- District: Kediri
- Village: Beraban
- Founder: Sergey Solonin

Government
  - CEO: Lev Kroll

Area
  - Total: 44 ha (110 acres)
- Website: www.nuanu.com

Nuanu Creative City is a 44-hectare mixed-use development in Tabanan Regency, Bali, Indonesia. It includes residential and hospitality properties, schools, cultural venues and recreational facilities.

The development was founded by Sergey Solonin and is led by CEO Lev Kroll. The name "Nuanu" is derived from the Balinese phrase Nu-Anu, meaning "in the process".

== History ==
Development of Nuanu began in 2021. ProEd Global School was operating at the site by 2023, with other parts opening in stages. The first phase opened to the public in 2025.

By 2025, the site included schools, restaurants, accommodation, arts and cultural spaces, and recreational facilities. The site has also hosted exhibitions and other cultural activities.

Nuanu Real Estate is the development's property division. It manages residential and hospitality properties at the site, including private units, townhouses, villas and branded residences.

== Environmental and social initiatives ==
About 70 percent of the site is designated as green and open space. The development uses electric transport and solar power, and some of its buildings and paths have been planned around existing vegetation. In 2026, a 1.6-hectare public park opened within the development.

Projects operating at Nuanu contribute a portion of their revenue to the Nuanu Social Fund. The fund has supported community programs in Bali, including education, cultural activities and local welfare projects.
