= Pupuan =

District of Tabanan, Bali

Pupuan ᬧᬸᬧᬸᬯᬦ᭄
- District
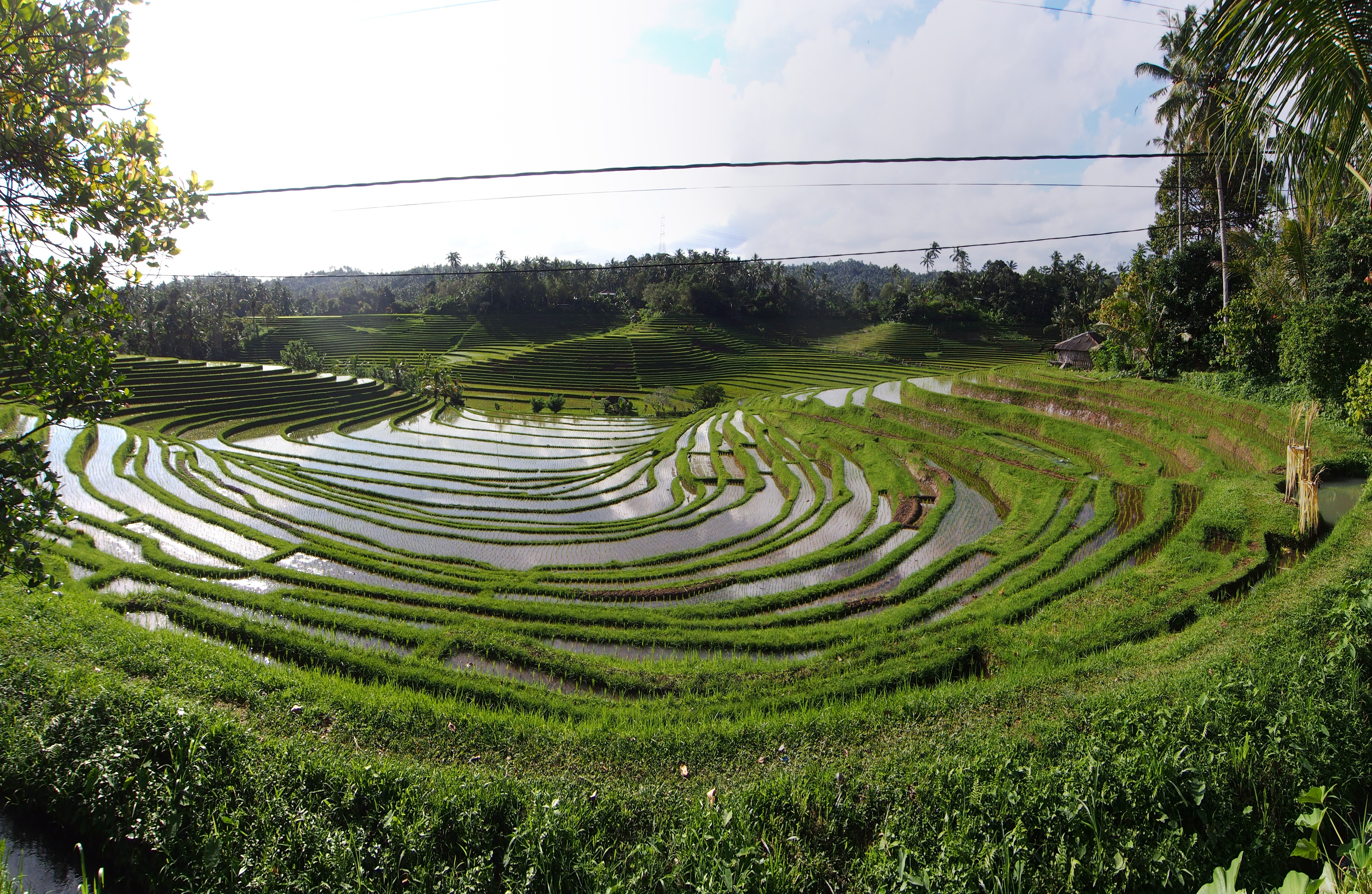
- Rice terraces in Pupuan

- Location map of Pupuan District in Tabanan Regency
- Coordinates: 8°21′0″S 115°0′0″E
- Country: Indonesia
- Province: Bali
- Regency: Tabanan
- District seat: Pupuan

Area
  - Total: 179.50 km^{2} (69.31 sq mi)
- Elevation: 700 m (2,300 ft)

Population (2020)
  - Total: 42,443
  - Density: 236.45/km^{2} (612.41/sq mi)
- Time zone: UTC+8 (WITA)
- Postal code: 82163
- Regional code: 62.361
- Villages: 15

Pupuan (Balinese: ᬧᬸᬧᬸᬯᬦ᭄) is a district (kecamatan) of the Tabanan Regency of Bali, Indonesia. As of 2023, it had a population of 45,678 and covers an area of 179.50 km². The district is known for its scenic rice terraces, coffee plantations, and cool climate due to its higher elevation.

== Governance ==
=== Villages ===
Pupuan is divided into 14 villages (desa):

Regional Code	Name	Area (km²)	Population (2023)	Hamlets (Banjar)
51.02.10.2001	Belimbing	22.49	4,671	8
51.02.10.2002	Sanda	12.70	1,602	3
51.02.10.2003	Batungsel	16.19	3,476	3
51.02.10.2004	Kebon Padangan	15.23	3,411	5
51.02.10.2005	Munduk Temu	22.55	3,829	6
51.02.10.2006	Pujungan	22.12	7,095	6
51.02.10.2007	Pupuan	5.70	3,235	5
51.02.10.2008	Bantiran	11.59	4,606	9
51.02.10.2009	Padangan	8.54	2,171	5
51.02.10.2010	Jelijih Punggung	9.64	1,426	3
51.02.10.2011	Belatungan	14.44	2,620	3
51.02.10.2012	Pajahan	8.16	2,624	2
51.02.10.2013	Karyasari	6.89	1,935	2
51.02.10.2014	Sai	2.78	1,847	4
51.02.10	Totals	179.02	44,584	71

== Economy ==
Pupuan's economy is primarily based on agriculture, with rice, coffee, and cloves being the main crops. The district is also known for its eco-tourism, attracting visitors to its lush landscapes and traditional Balinese culture.
