= Baturiti =

District of Tabanan, Bali

Baturiti ᬩᬢᬸᬭᬶᬢᬶ
- District
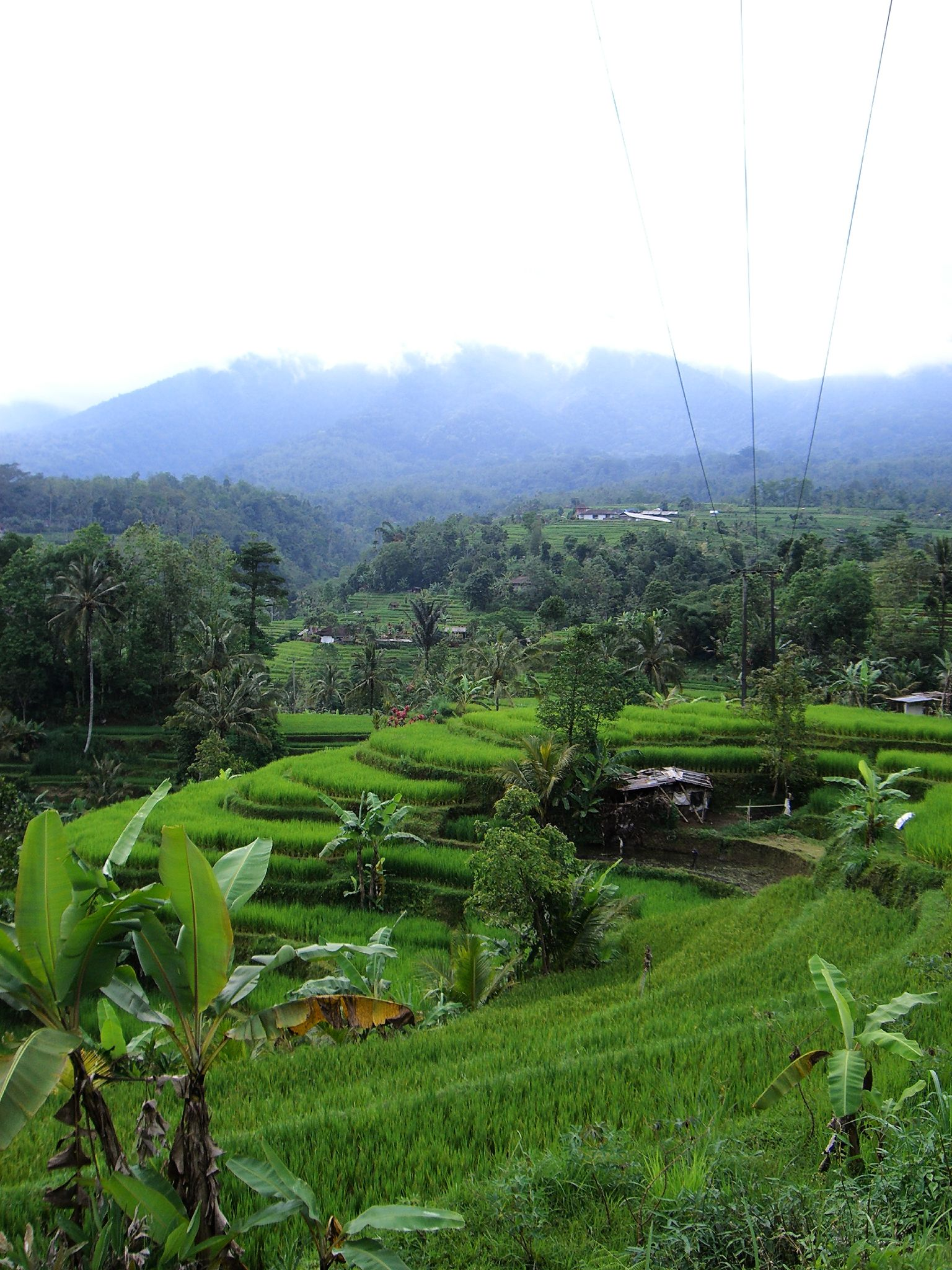
- Jati Luwih rice terraces in Bedugul, Candikuning, Baturiti

- Location map of Baturiti District in Tabanan Regency
- Coordinates: 8°20′0″S 115°10′0″E
- Country: Indonesia
- Province: Bali
- Regency: Tabanan
- District seat: Baturiti

Area
  - Total: 121.50 km^{2} (46.91 sq mi)
- Elevation: 600 m (2,000 ft)

Population (2023)
  - Total: 52,345
  - Density: 430.82/km^{2} (1,115.8/sq mi)
- Time zone: UTC+8 (WITA)
- Postal code: 82191
- Regional code: 62.361
- Villages: 12

Baturiti (ᬩᬢᬸᬭᬶᬢᬶ) is a district (kecamatan) in Tabanan Regency, Bali Province, Indonesia. As of 2023, it had a population of 52,345 and covers an area of 121.50 km².

== Geography ==
=== Villages ===
The district of Baturiti is divided into the following villages (desa):

- Angseri
- Antapan
- Apuan
- Bangli
- Batunya
- Baturiti
- Candikuning
- Luwus
- Mekarsari
- Perean
- Perean Kangin
- Perean Tengah

=== Climate ===
Climate data for Baturiti, Bali
Month	Jan	Feb	Mar	Apr	May	Jun	Jul	Aug	Sep	Oct	Nov	Dec	Year
Mean daily maximum °C (°F)	28 (82)	28 (82)	29 (84)	29 (84)	28 (82)	28 (82)	27 (81)	27 (81)	28 (82)	29 (84)	29 (84)	28 (82)	28 (83)
Mean daily minimum °C (°F)	19 (66)	19 (66)	19 (66)	19 (66)	18 (64)	18 (64)	17 (63)	17 (63)	18 (64)	19 (66)	19 (66)	19 (66)	18 (65)
Average precipitation mm (inches)	304 (12.0)	262 (10.3)	248 (9.8)	138 (5.4)	102 (4.0)	63 (2.5)	62 (2.4)	44 (1.7)	66 (2.6)	125 (4.9)	196 (7.7)	250 (9.8)	1,860 (73.1)
Source: Meteoblue (modeled/calculated data, not measured locally)
