= Penebel =

District of Tabanan, Bali

Penebel ᬧᭂᬦᭂᬩᭂᬮ᭄
- District
- Location map of Penebel district in Tabanan Regency
- Coordinates: 8°23′S 115°07′E
- Country: Indonesia
- Province: Bali
- Regency: Tabanan
- District seat: Penebel

Area
  - Total: 141.98 km^{2} (54.82 sq mi)

Population (2020)
  - Total: 49,637
  - Density: 349.61/km^{2} (905.47/sq mi)
- Time zone: UTC+8 (WITA)
- Postal code: 82152
- Villages: 18

Penebel (Balinese: ᬧᭂᬦᭂᬩᭂᬮ᭄) is a district (kecamatan) of the Tabanan Regency of Bali, Indonesia. According to the 2020 census, it has a population of 49,637 and covers an area of 141.98 km².

== Governance ==
=== Villages ===
Penebel District is divided into 18 villages (desa), namely:

Regional Code	Name	Area (km²)	Population (2023)
51.02.08.2001	Rejasa	3.66	1,546
51.02.08.2002	Jegu	3.80	3,413
51.02.08.2003	Riang Gede	5.29	2,789
51.02.08.2004	Buruan	4.33	2,050
51.02.08.2005	Biaung	3.82	3,666
51.02.08.2006	Pitra	5.90	2,134
51.02.08.2007	Penatahan	3.51	2,731
51.02.08.2008	Tengkudak	5.91	2,594
51.02.08.2009	Mengesta	8.80	3,305
51.02.08.2010	Penebel	4.56	4,431
51.02.08.2011	Babahan	4.31	6,721
51.02.08.2012	Senganan	6.24	3,010
51.02.08.2013	Jatiluwih	22.23	3,451
51.02.08.2014	Wongaya Gede	9.84	2,758
51.02.08.2015	Tajen	4.80	2,547
51.02.08.2016	Tegallinggah	3.71	1,885
51.02.08.2017	Pesagi	5.41	1,411
51.02.08.2018	Sangketan	4.50	2,105
51.02.08	Totals	110.62	52,547
