= Tabanan Regency =

Regency in Bali, Indonesia

Tabanan Regency Kabupaten Tabanan
- Regency

Native transcription(s)
  - Balinese: ᬓᬪᬹᬧᬢᬾᬦ᭄ ᬢᬩᬦᬦ᭄ Kabupatén Tabanan
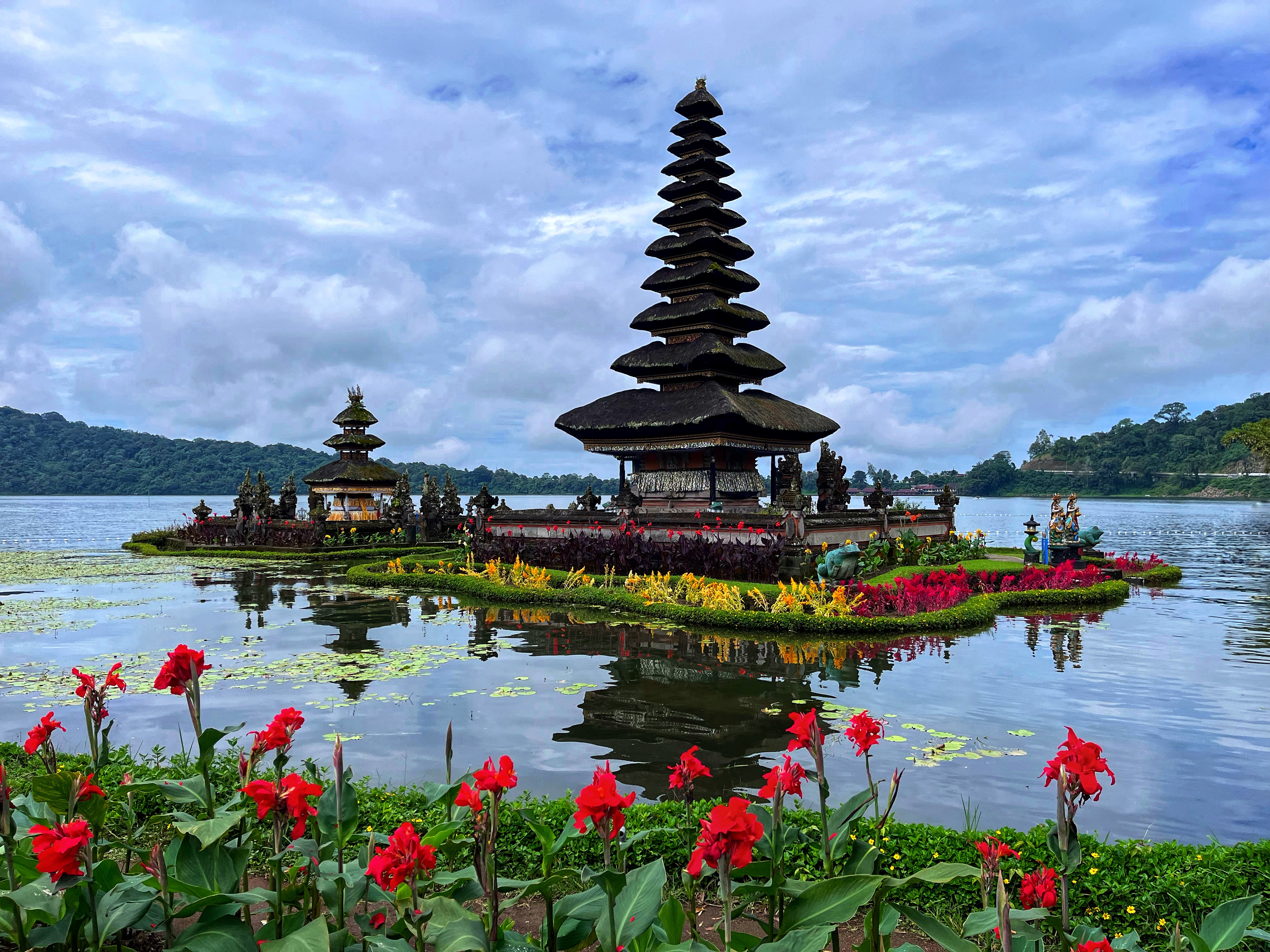
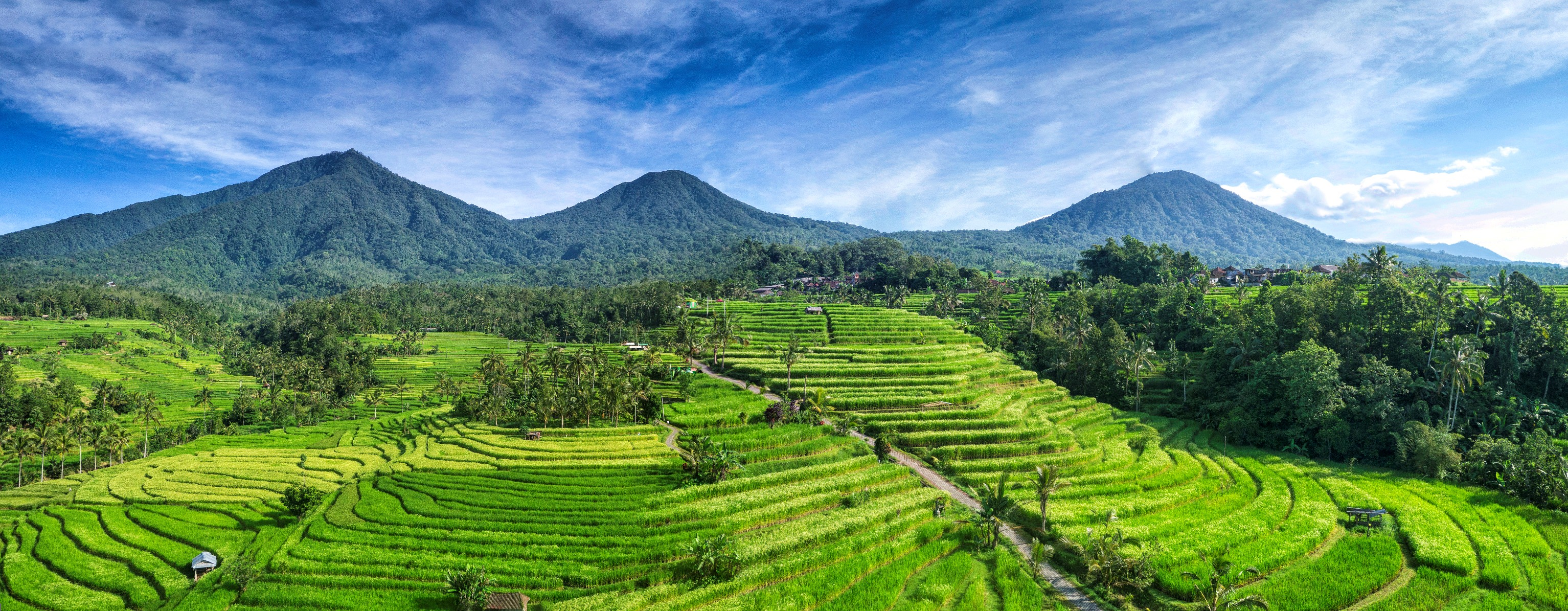
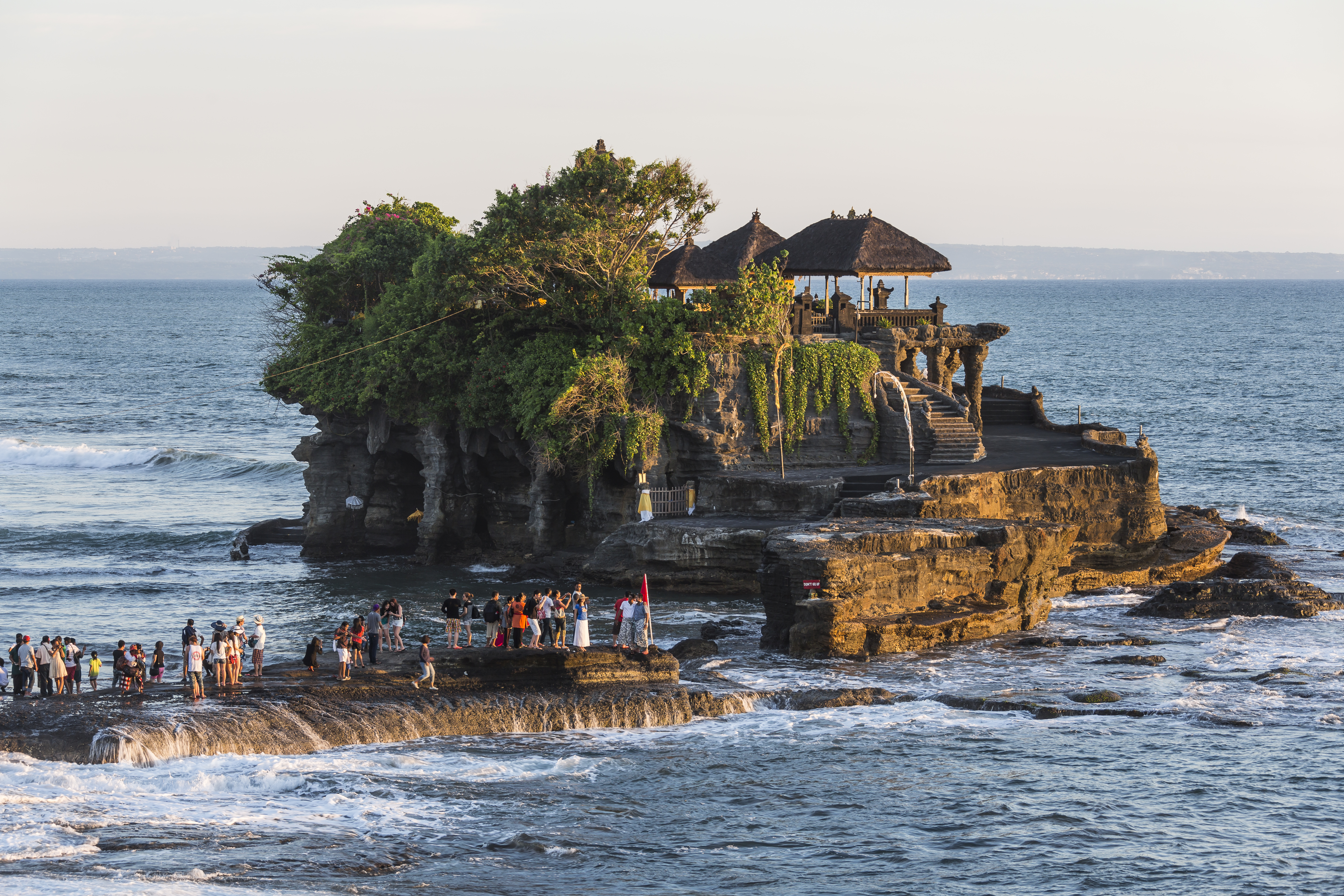
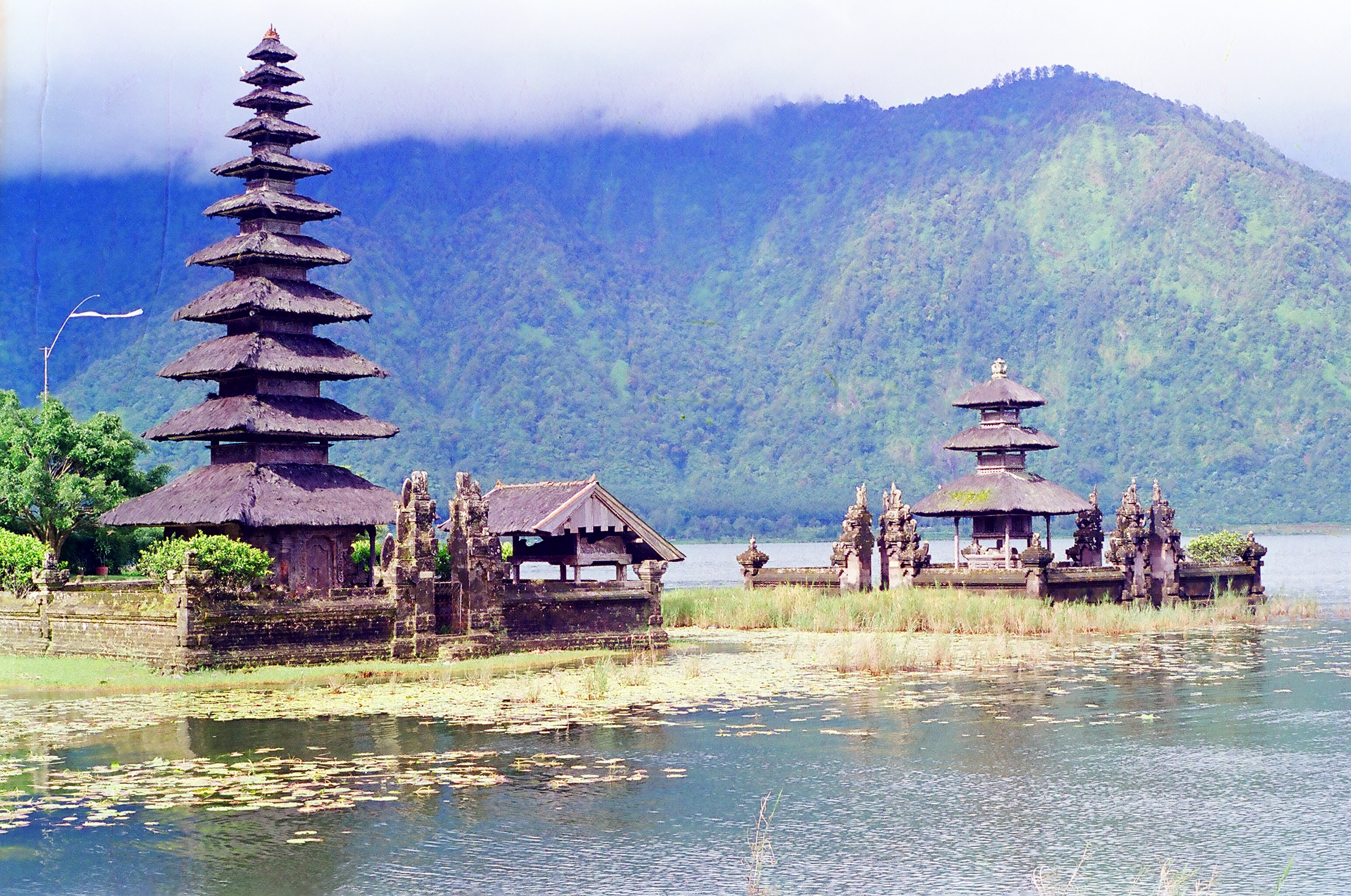
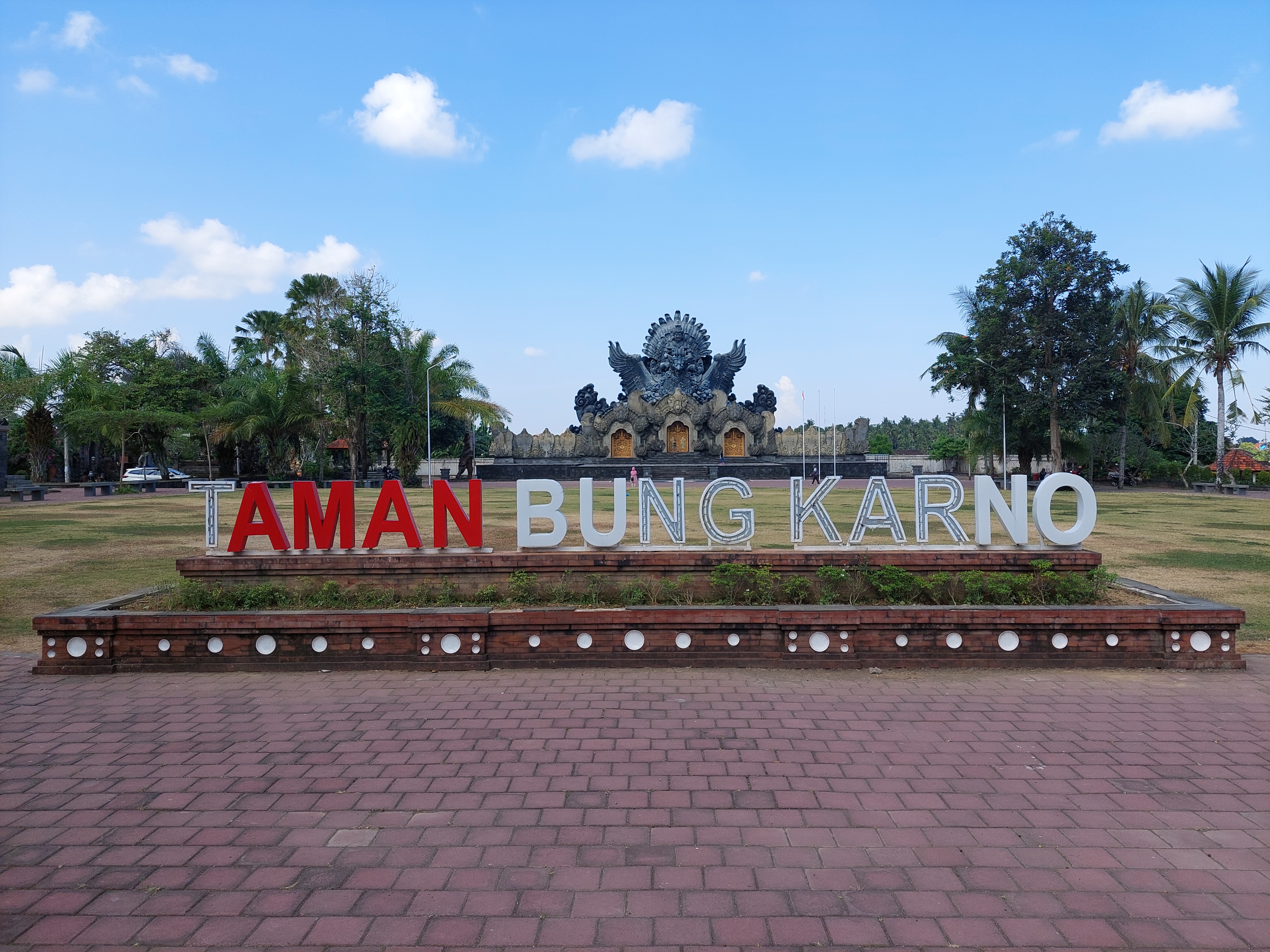
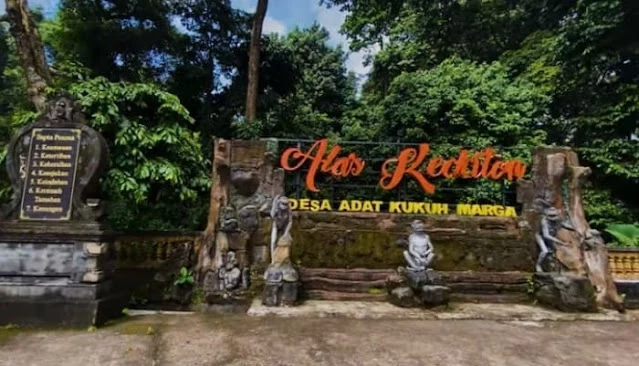
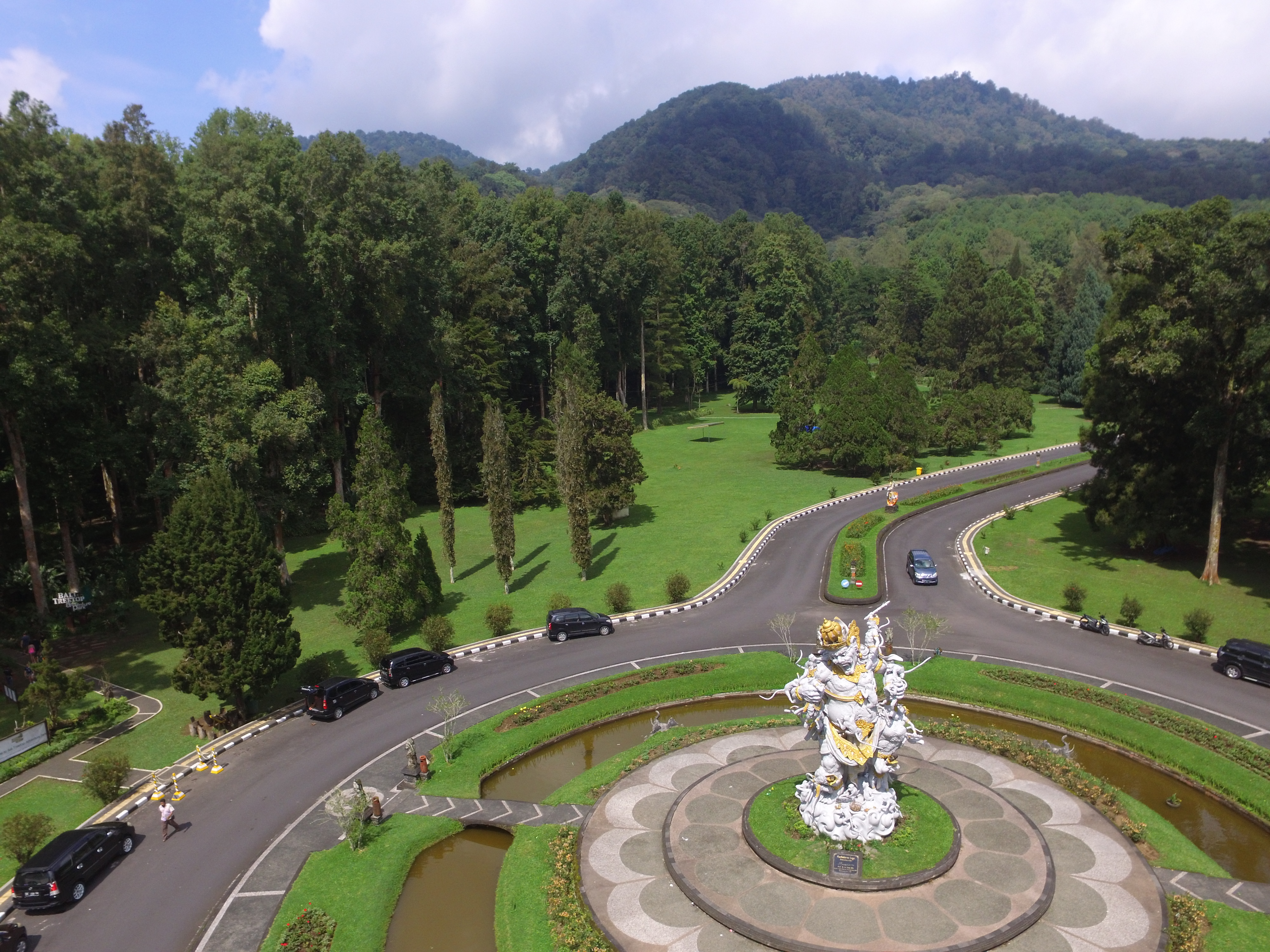
- Ulun Danu Bratan Temple, Bedugul Jatiluwih Tanah Lot Temple Lake Bratan Bung Karno Park Alas Kedaton Bali Botanic Garden

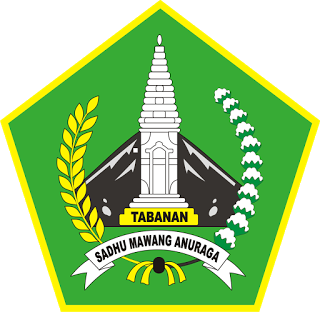
- Coat of arms
- Nickname: Daerah Lumbung Padi ('Paddy Barn Region'/'Bali's Paddy Barn')
- Motto(s): Sadhu Mawang Anuraga (Balinese/Old Javanese) ᬲᬟᬸᬫᬯᬂᬅᬦᬸᬭᬕ "Loyal and Wise in Carrying out Dharma for the Love of the People"
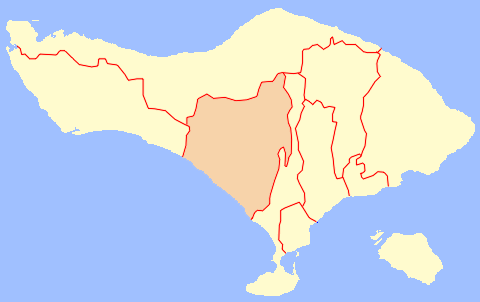
- Location within Bali

- Location in Bali Location in Lesser Sunda Islands Location in Indonesia Location in Southeast Asia Location in Asia
- Coordinates: 8°33′4.13″S 115°7′17.81″E
- Country: Indonesia
- Region: Lesser Sunda Islands
- Province: Bali
- Metropolitan area: Sarbagita
- Districts: List: Selemadeg; East Selemadeg; West Selemadeg; Kerambitan; Tabanan; Kediri; Marga; Penebel; Pupuan
- Established: 14 August 1958
- Capital: Singasana

Government
  - Body: Tabanan Regency Government
  - Regent: I Komang Gede Sanjaya (PDI-P)
  - Vice Regent: I Made Dirga
  - Legislature: Tabanan Regency Regional House of Representatives (DPRD)

Area
  - Total: 839.33 km^{2} (324.07 sq mi)

Population (mid 2024 estimate)
  - Total: 478.390
  - Density: 0.56997/km^{2} (1.4762/sq mi)

Demographics
  - Ethnic groups (2010): 93.38% Balinese; 4.80% Javanese; 0.42% Madurese; 0.30% Sasak; 0.24% Chinese; 0.18% Sundanese; 0.07% Flores; 0.03% Bugis; 0.01% Flores; 0.58% other
  - Religion (2024): 92.42% Hinduism; 5.56% Islam; 1.54% Christianity; 1.08% Protestanism; 0.46% Catholicism; 0.48% Buddhism
  - Languages and dialects: Indonesian (official); Balinese (native); Lowland Balinese; Tabanan Balinese; Highland Balinese other
- Time zone: UTC+8 (ICST)
- Area code: (+62) 361
- ISO 3166 code: ID-BA-TA
- Vehicle registration: DK
- HDI (2023): ▲0.774 high
- Website: tabanankab.go.id

UNESCO World Heritage Site
- Official name: Cultural Landscape of Bali Province: the Subak System as a Manifestation of the Tri Hita Karana Philosophy
- Criteria: Cultural: (iii), (v), (vi)
- Reference: 1194
- Inscription: 2012 (36th Session)
- Area: 19,519.9 ha (48,235 acres)
- Buffer zone: 1,454.8 ha (3,595 acres)

Tabanan Regency (Indonesian: Kabupaten Tabanan, Balinese: ᬓᬪᬹᬧᬢᬾᬦ᭄ ᬢᬩᬦᬦ᭄, Kabupatén Tabanan) is a regency (kabupaten) of the province of Bali, Indonesia. It has an area of 839.33 km^{2} and had a population of 478,390 in 2024 census. It is bordered by Badung Regency to its east, Buleleng Regency to its north and Jembrana Regency to its west, and the Indian Ocean to its south. Its regency seat is the town of Singasana.

Tabanan is known for its Subak irrigation system which is recognized by the UNESCO since 2012. One of the popular tourism attractions located in Tabanan is the offshore rocky islet of Tanah Lot.

== Geography ==
=== Topography ===
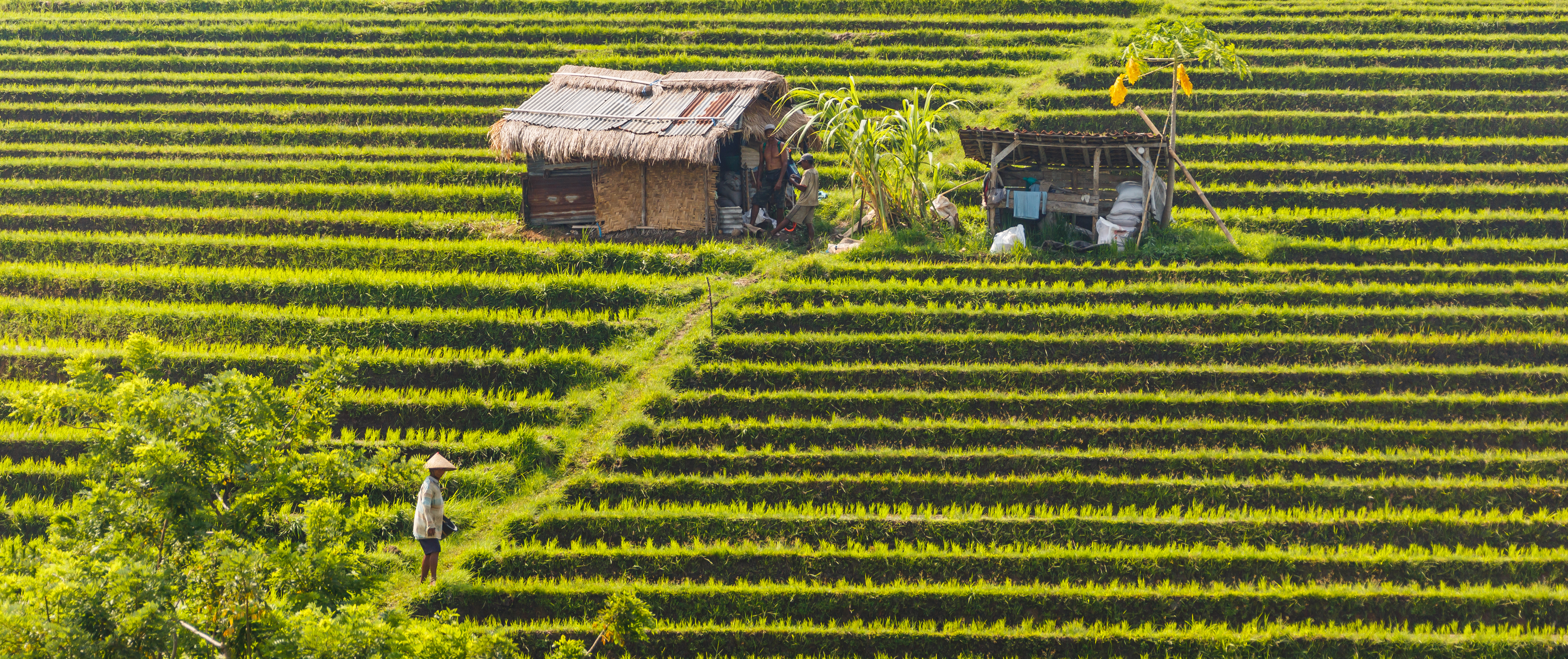
Agricultural area, rice/paddy in Tabanan

Tabanan Regency is located in the southern part of Bali Island, Tabanan Regency has an area of 1,013.88 km² or 17.54% of the area of Bali province consisting of mountainous and coastal areas. Geographically, Tabanan Regency is located between 114 ° 54'52 "- 115 ° 12'57" east longitude and 8 ° 14'30 "- 8 ° 30'70" south latitude.

The topography of this regency is located between an altitude of 0 - 2,276 meters above sea level, with details; at an altitude of 0 – 500 meters above sea level is a flat area with a slope of 2 - 15%. Meanwhile, at an altitude of 500-1,000 meters above sea level, it is a flat to sloping area with a slope of 15-40%. In areas with a slope of 2-15% and 15-40%, it is a fairly fertile area that becomes agricultural land. In areas with an altitude of over 1,000 m above sea level and with a slope of 40% and above, it is a hilly and steep area.

The boundaries of Tabanan Regency include: in the north it borders Buleleng Regency, which is bordered by a row of mountains such as Mount Batukaru (2,276 m), Mount Sanghyang (2,023 m), Mount Pohen (2,051 m), Mount Penggilingan (2,082 m), and Mount Beratan (2,020 m); in the east it borders Badung Regency, which is bordered by Tukad Yeh Sungi, Tukad Yeh Ukun and Tukad Yeh Penet. In the south it is bordered by the Indian Ocean, with a coastline of 37 km; in the west it borders Jembrana Regency which is bordered by Tukad Yeh Let.

The area of Tabanan Regency is 23,358 Ha or 28.00% of the land area is rice fields, so that Tabanan Regency is known as an agricultural area. Tabanan's superior potential is in the agricultural sector because most of the livelihoods, the mainstay of the regional economy, and the use of land in the Tabanan region are still dominated by agriculture in the broad sense. Tabanan Regency consists of 10 Districts (Tabanan District, Kediri District, Kerambitan District, Selemadeg District, West Selemadeg District, East Selemadeg District, Penebel District, Pupuan District, Marga District, and Baturiti District),

Tabanan Regency is located in a tropical area with two different seasons between the dry season and the rainy season interspersed with transitional seasons. Air temperature varies and is also determined by the altitude, averaging around 27.60 C. Irrigation conditions are influenced by the shape of the coast and rainfall which are sources of water storage and irrigation sources besides the lake which is 377 Ha in size located in Baturiti District.

=== Land Use ===
When viewed from land control, from the existing area, around 22,562 km2 (26.88%) of the Tabanan area is rice fields and 61,371 km² (73.12%) is non-rice fields. Of the 73.12 percent of non-rice fields, 99.95 percent of it is dry land, most of which is dry fields, gardens, and state forests, the remaining 0.05 percent is other land such as ponds, fish ponds and swamps.

=== Rainfall ===
From its topography, Tabanan Regency is a mountainous and coastal area. This results in differences in temperature in each area in Tabanan Regency. These temperature differences can ultimately affect rainfall levels. Of the two active rainfall recording stations in Tabanan Regency, the highest rainfall in 2010 occurred in January, April, and September to December. This means that in the months concerned, the frequency of rainfall is high.

=== Land ===
Based on records from the National Land Agency of Tabanan Regency, the number of land rights that have been registered up to 2010 was 201,988, most of which (94.97%) are ownership rights. Ownership of land rights has increased by around 5.49 percent compared to the previous year.

=== Climate ===
Tabanan has a tropical rainforest climate (Af) with moderate rainfall from April to September and heavy rainfall from October to March.

Climate data for Tabanan
Month	Jan	Feb	Mar	Apr	May	Jun	Jul	Aug	Sep	Oct	Nov	Dec	Year
Mean daily maximum °C (°F)	30.4 (86.7)	30.5 (86.9)	30.6 (87.1)	31.1 (88.0)	30.8 (87.4)	30.1 (86.2)	29.4 (84.9)	29.5 (85.1)	30.3 (86.5)	31.1 (88.0)	31.2 (88.2)	30.8 (87.4)	30.5 (86.9)
Daily mean °C (°F)	26.3 (79.3)	26.3 (79.3)	26.2 (79.2)	26.3 (79.3)	26.0 (78.8)	25.3 (77.5)	24.9 (76.8)	24.9 (76.8)	25.6 (78.1)	26.3 (79.3)	26.5 (79.7)	26.4 (79.5)	25.9 (78.6)
Mean daily minimum °C (°F)	22.2 (72.0)	22.2 (72.0)	21.9 (71.4)	21.6 (70.9)	21.2 (70.2)	20.5 (68.9)	20.4 (68.7)	20.4 (68.7)	20.9 (69.6)	21.5 (70.7)	21.9 (71.4)	22.1 (71.8)	21.4 (70.5)
Average rainfall mm (inches)	314 (12.4)	260 (10.2)	221 (8.7)	102 (4.0)	111 (4.4)	110 (4.3)	135 (5.3)	69 (2.7)	108 (4.3)	213 (8.4)	237 (9.3)	298 (11.7)	2,178 (85.7)
Source: Climate-Data.org

== Government and politics ==
No.	Regent	Start of Term	End of Term	Vice Regent
11	I Komang Gede Sanjaya	February 20, 2025	Incumbent	I Made Dirga

The regent of Tabanan is the highest officeholder in the Tabanan Regency government. The Regent of Tabanan is responsible to the governor of the province of Bali. Currently, the regent serving in Tabanan Regency is I Komang Gede Sanjaya, accompanied by the vice regent I Made Dirga. In the previous period, Sanjaya was the vice regent, accompanying the regent until 2021. Then Sanjaya with his first running mate, Edi Wirawan ran in the 2020 Tabanan regency election, and won, then were inaugurated on February 21, 2021, until the term of office in 2024. Then Sanjaya again for second term, ran with his second running mate, Dirga in 2024 Tabanan regency election and re-elect, they were both inaugurated on February 20, 2025.

=== Judiciary ===
Tabanan Regency Judicial Statistics in 2010, there were 302 defendants whose cases had received court decisions. When viewed from the age group, most of the defendants were 21 years old and above, which is around 93.98%. The number of prisoners who entered the Tabanan State Detention Center in 2010 was 246 people, consisting of 224 people with prison status of less than 1 year and 15 people with prison status of 1–5 years and 6 people with status of more than 5 years. Traffic violations in Tabanan Regency during 2010 were 8,331. When compared to the previous year, this number decreased by 48.82 percent. In 2010, 253 accident cases were recorded, with 73 people dying, 145 people seriously injured and 226 people lightly injured.

=== Administrative districts ===
Districts in Tabanan Regency

The regency is divided into ten districts (kecamatan), tabulated below with their areas and population totals at the 2010 census and the 2020 census, together with the official estimates as of mid 2024. The table also includes the locations of the district administrative centres, the number of administrative villages in each district (all classed as rural desa), and its postal codes.

Kode Wilayah	Name of District (kecamatan)	Area in km^{2}	Pop'n census 2010	Pop'n census 2020	Pop'n estimate mid 2024	Admin centre	No. of villages	Post codes
51.02.01	Selemadeg	52.05	19,262	21,874	22,380	Bajera	10	82164
51.02.02	East Selemadeg (East Selemadeg)	54.78	21,154	23,826	24,620	Megati	10	82160
51.02.03	West Selemadeg (West Selemadeg)	120.15	18,809	21,079	22,230	Antosari	11	82162
51.02.04	Kerambitan	42.39	37,704	41,766	43,520	Kerambitan	15	82161
51.02.05	Tabanan (district and town)	51.40	70,526	76,235	77,310	Tabanan (town)	12	82111: 82115
51.02.06	Kediri	53.60	84,215	90,491	90,260	Kediri	15	82121: 82123
51.02.07	Marga	44.79	40,353	42,898	45,090	Marga	16	82181
51.02.09	Baturiti	99.17	46,425	51,381	52,680	Baturiti	12	82191
51.02.08	Penebel	141.98	44,104	49,637	55,590	Penebel	18	82152
51.02.10	Pupuan	179.02	38,361	42,443	44,710	Pupuan	14	82163
	Totals	839.33	420,913	461,630	478,390		133	

The administrative centre of Selemadeg District is at Bajera, that of Selemadeg Timur is at Megati, and that of Selemadeg Barat is at Antosari; the other districts share the same name as their administrative centre. Kediti and Tabanan Districts in the southeast of the regency are within the official metropolitan area of Greater Denpasar (Sarbagita); Pupuan, Selemadeg Barat, Selemadeg, and Selemadeg Timur Districts together constitute the western half of the Regency.

== Demographics ==
=== Population ===
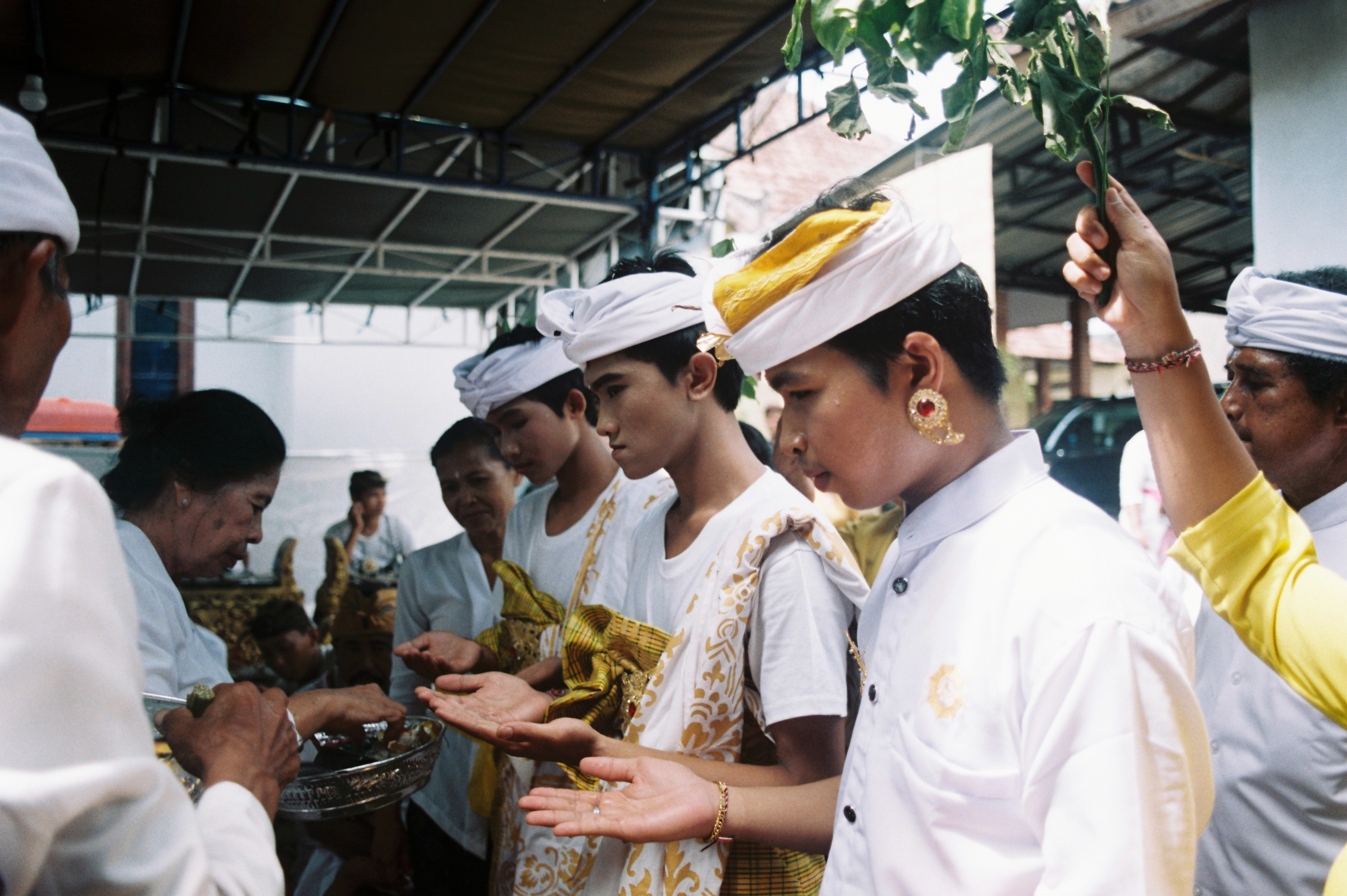
The Mepandes ceremony, or the 'tooth-filing' custom of adult Hindu Balinese in Tabanan

The population of Tabanan Regency in 2004 was recorded at 404,582 people with an average growth rate of 0.36 percent per year over the past five years. In the period 2000–2004, the average population density was 469.43 people/km^{2}. The population growth rate is concentrated in Singasana City and Kediri, including Abiantuwung, Kediri, Banjar Anyar, Delod Peken, Dajan Peken, Dauh Peken, Denbantas, Subamia and Bongan Village due to urbanization spread across the KPR/BTN housing complex and the opening of new residential areas. The population composition shows Sex Ratio 98.27. The number of heads of families (KK) in Tabanan Regency is recorded at 98,913 with an average of 4.1 people per household.

The average delay in the age of marriage for women reaches 24.2 years. The success of population management, in addition to the success of control, is also due to social support such as: education, health and welfare in the economy. This can be seen from the increase in the rate of economic growth which is marked by improving per capita income. From year to year, the per capita income of Tabanan Regency residents has shown an increasing trend, in 2000 it was Rp 3,706,700.52,- and in 2004 it was Rp 5,358,758.91,-

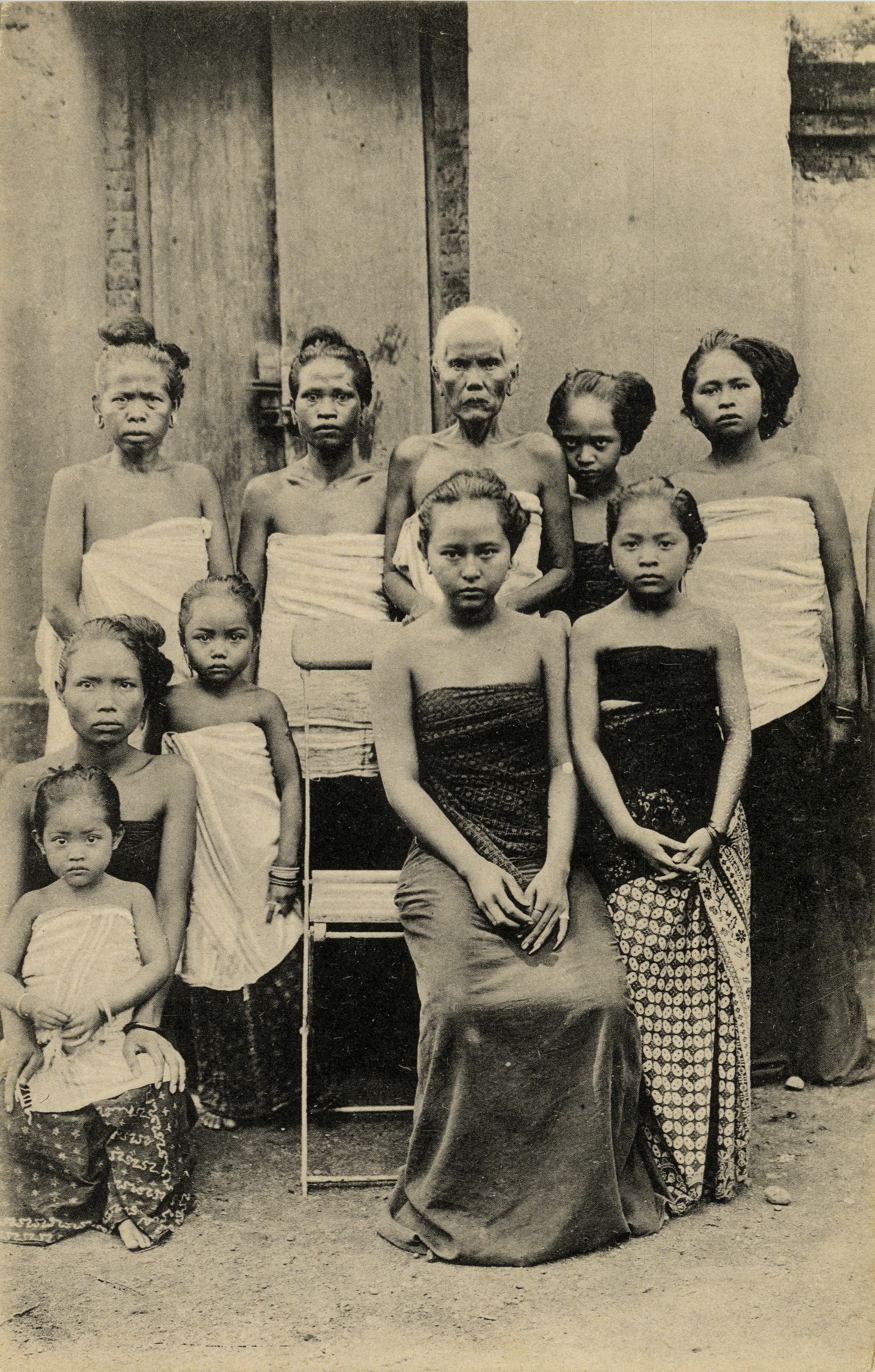
Balinese Princess, South Bali, between 1890 and 1930

As a region bordering the Indonesian Ocean, Tabanan Regency has a coastline of 35 km stretching from East to West, starting at Nyanyi Beach, Kediri District to Selabih Beach, West Selemadeg District. The marine and coastal potential has been utilized through fishing efforts and tourist attractions.

Based on the results of population registration in 2010, the population of Tabanan Regency was recorded at 431,162 people with a natural growth rate of 0.15. Of the 431,162 people, 214,264 (49.69%) were male and 216,898 (50.31%) were female. Judging from the population composition, the sex ratio of the population of Tabanan Regency in 2010 was 98.79. This value means that for every 100 female residents in Tabanan Regency, there are 98 male residents.

Tabanan Regency with an area of 839 km^{2} and a population of 431,162 people, the population density reaches 513 people per km^{2}. When viewed from the population density level per sub-district, the distribution of the population in Tabanan Regency is uneven. There are several sub-districts with population densities far above average, including Kediri (1,399 people per km^{2}), Tabanan (1,235 people per km^{2}), Marga (970 people per km^{2}), and Kerambitan (930 people per km^{2}), Baturiti (515 people per km^{2}) while others have a population density of 500 people per km^{2} and below.

=== Religion ===
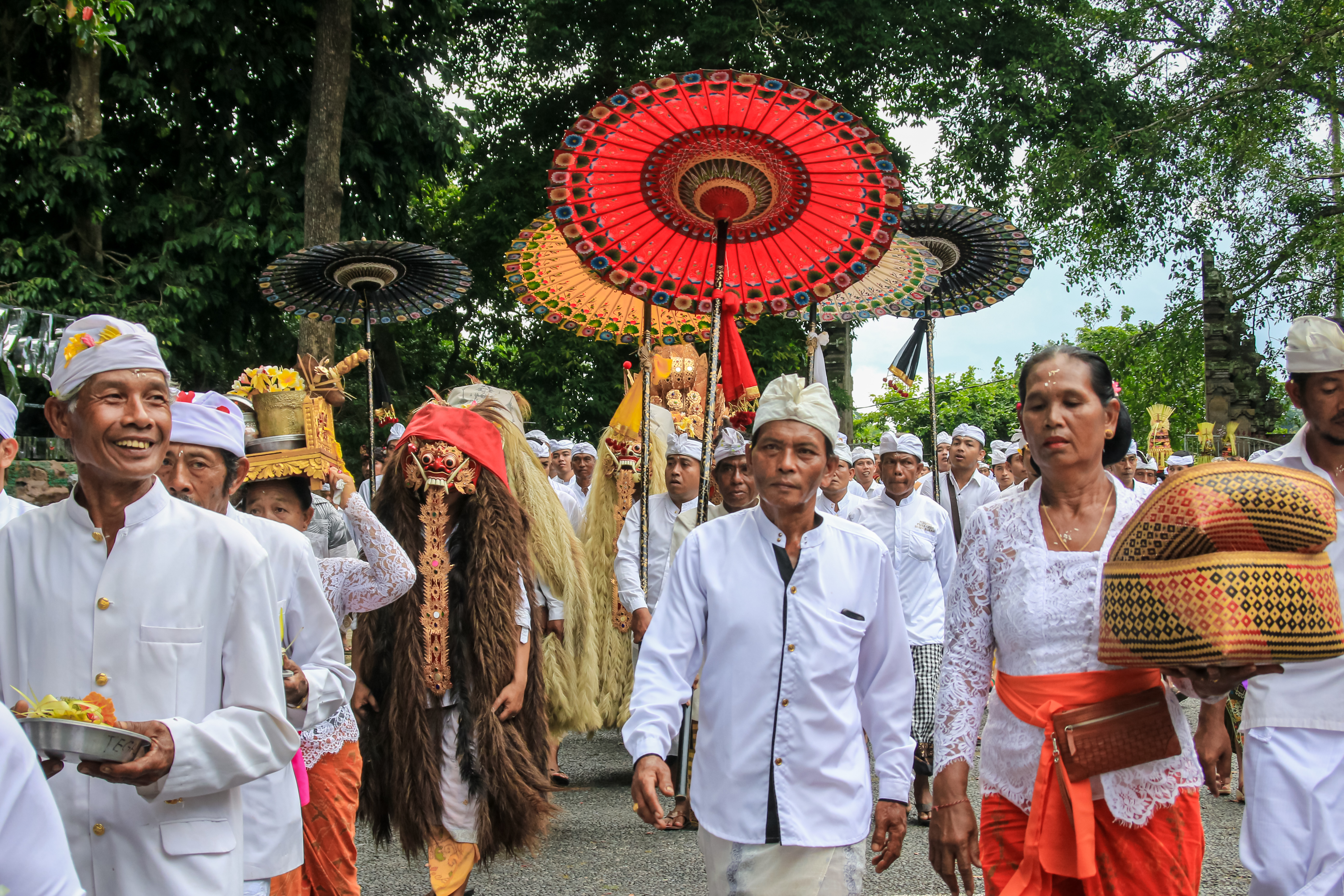
Mapeed tradition, Hindu people in Alas Kedaton

As a country based on Pancasila and the 1945 Constitution, the State guarantees religious life and maintains harmony between religious communities. For this reason, adequate facilities and infrastructure are needed to improve services for all religious communities. Most of the population of Tabanan Regency is Hindu, this is reflected in the number of places of worship in Tabanan Regency. In 2010 in Tabanan Regency there were 1,163 places of worship for Hinduism, 43 for Islam, 6 for Catholicism, 3 for Buddhism and 9 for Protestantism.

=== Ethnic groups ===
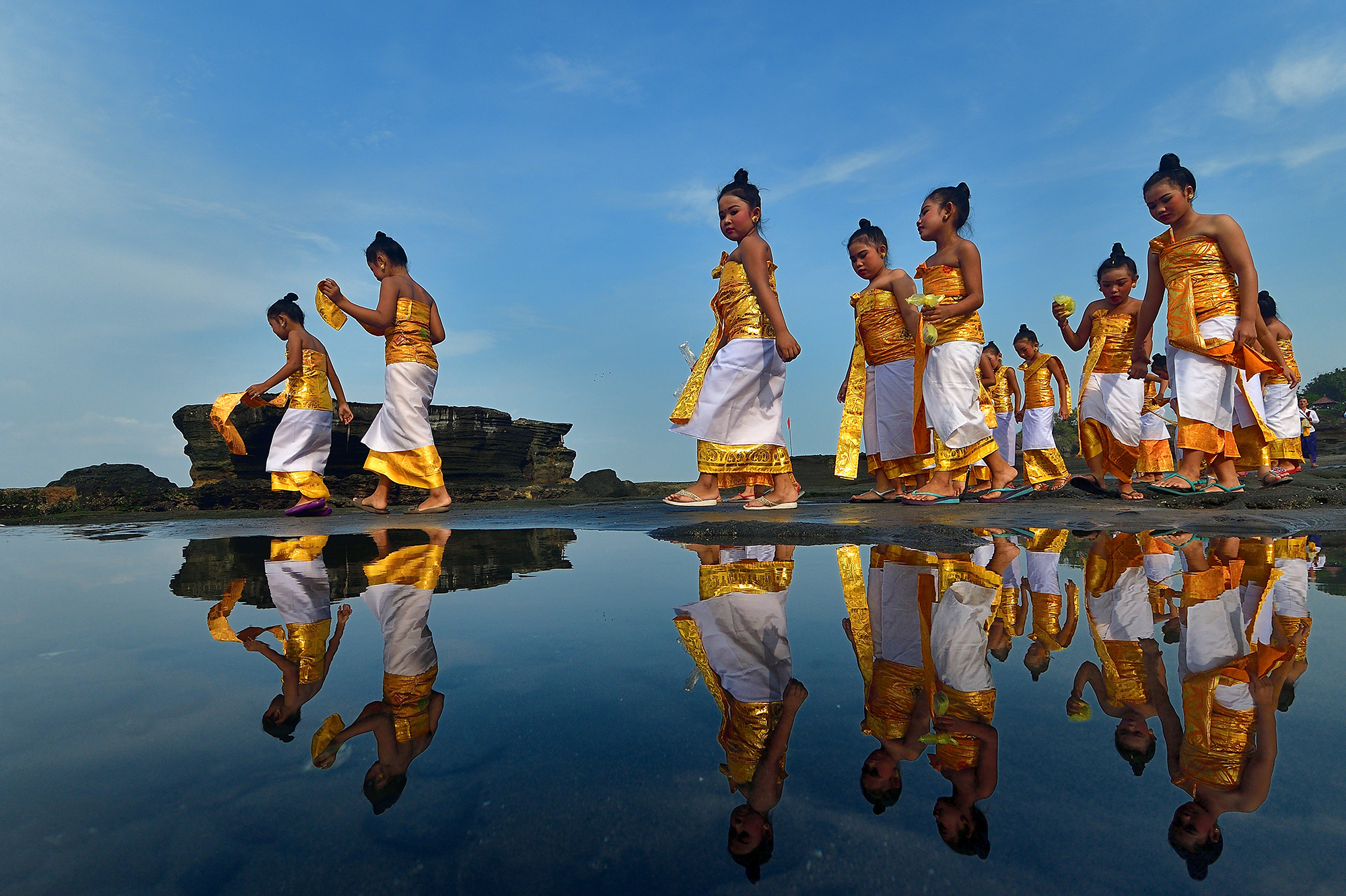
Balinese children performing Rejang dance in Tanah Lot.

Most of the ethnic groups in Tabanan are Balinese. Based on data from the Central Bureau of Statistics in the 2010 Indonesian Population Census, as many as 93.38% of the 624,125 residents of Tabanan Regency are of the Balinese ethnic. Then the Javanese ethnic as much as 4.80%, and several others such as the Madurese, Sasak, and others.

The following is the population of Tabanan Regency based on ethnicity in 2010:

No.	Ethnic groups	Pop. (2010)	Pct. (%)
1	Balinese	393,042	93.38%
2	Javanese	20,194	4.80%
3	Madurese	1,787	0.42%
4	Sasak	1,282	0.30%
5	Chinese	988	0.24%
6	Sundanese	760	0.18%
7	Flores	285	0.07%
8	Bugis	132	0.03%
9	Others	2,443	0.58%
	Tabanan Regency	420.913	100%

=== Workforce ===
The results of the 2010 National Labor Force Survey (SAKERNAS), the workforce in Tabanan Regency was 261,534 people. Of the existing workforce, 254,402 people (97.27%) are working residents, and the remaining 7,132 (2.73%) are unemployed. The workforce population in Tabanan Regency, the population works in the agricultural sector, which is around 43.96 percent. The workforce population working in the trade sector is 44,250 people (17.39%), in the industrial sector as many as 35,313 people (13.88%), and the rest are spread across the other six sectors. The number of residents who are not in the workforce in Tabanan Regency is 82,354 people, of which 19,249 people (23.37%) are still in school, 48,697 people (59.13%) are taking care of the household and 14,408 (17.05%) for other reasons.

== Education ==
The number of TKK schools in Tabanan Regency in 2010 was 219 with 6,394 students. The number of SD in Tabanan Regency in 2010 was 339, with 35,969 and 3,383 students and teachers respectively. From this situation, it can be seen that the ratio of students to teachers for Elementary Schools is 11. This ratio means that every 1 elementary school teacher must educate 13 students.

Compared to the previous year, the number of junior high school students in Tabanan Regency in 2010 increased by 1.01 percent. Of the 18,232 junior high school students, there were 1,644 teachers teaching at the junior high school level. This means that the ratio of students to teachers for junior high school level is 11.

For senior high schools (SMU and SMK), the number of students in Tabanan Regency has increased from 12,551 people in 2009 to 12,551 people in 2010. The number of teachers teaching in senior high schools is 1,517 teachers. This means that the ratio of students to teachers for senior high schools is 9. In Tabanan Regency there are 4 universities, all three of which are Private Universities (PTS). The number of PTS students in Tabanan Regency in 2010 increased from 1,913 people in 2009 to 2,079 people in 2010.

== Health ==
In Tabanan Regency, there are 20 Community Health Centers, 78 sub-health centers, and 30 mobile community health centers. Meanwhile, there is one state hospital in Tabanan Regency with 190 beds. Compared to the previous year, the number of health workers at Tabanan Regency Hospital in 2010 increased by 1.17 percent.

The number of patients recorded at Tabanan Hospital during 2010 was 125,141 patients, of which 110,301 were outpatients, and 14,840 were inpatients. Of the inpatients recorded at Tabanan Hospital, the most patients were treated due to single live birth cases (15.61%). Meanwhile, for cases of death, most were caused by blood poisoning (42.02%).

== Tourism ==
=== Tourism development control ===
To preserve the largest area of 53,000 hectares of agriculture fields on the island, the Tabanan Regency Administration does not allow the development of star-rated city hotels anymore. Tourism facilities with a commitment to environmental conservation are allowed, with 30% land surface for buildings and 70% land surface to be left natural as paddy fields or other plantations. The administration has also decided a 300-hectare protected zone of paddy fields, and a 100-hectare housing zone outside the protected zone.
For visitors, it is possible to visit the 300-hectare on foot (about 3 1/2 hrs trekking) or with an e-bike tour that the local villagers have organized since 2017 (about 1 hour).

=== Puri Anyar Kerambitan ===
Puri Anyar Kerambitan ("new palace of Kerambitan"), in Baturiti, is one of the three royal palaces (puri) in Kerambitan district. It was built in the 1620's by the 12th king of Tabanan for his second son - the first son having inherited Puri Agung Kerambitan, at that time the only existing palace. Each palace received more than 100 hectares of land and the proceeds of said land. Large ceremonies for the community were held there. Foreign dignitaries visited for trade agreements and other affairs. Among the gifts that they brought were many ceramic plates, original Delftware (Delft Blue) from Holland, which ended up embedded as adornments into building walls and temple shrines; they can still be seen there to this day.
After the Indonesian independence (1945) came the Land Reform Law in 1961 and the land was taken away, leaving the puri with no income for its maintenance. Pak Oka, heir at that time, opened the palace to the public, as a centre of ceremonies but also of cultural celebration: 'Royal Dinners' were held, showcasing local dances and cultures. From 1967, Puri Anyar Kerambitan became a social hub. Among the visitors were David Bowie, King Hussein of Jordan, Dewi Sukarno, Mick Jagger (who visited 3 times as he hoped to learn the tektekan dance, not realising it was a sacred trance dance). Income was thus provided to maintain the palace and temple.
Then came in mass tourism and quick fixes, and out went the celebrities - and the income. The present heir, Ibu Giri Putri, has undertaken the task of restoring the temple. The whole place has a considerable historical value: it is one of the last palaces to retain its original structure. Its middle courtyard (jabah tengan) has not changed for 400 years; nor has the layout of the whole compound, built according to the principles of kosala-kosali, (Note: kosala-kosali, similar to feng shui, is a complex system of architecture deeply intertwined with Balinese culture and spirituality. Its rules are described in a lontar known as Kosala Kosali, dating from the arrival of the Aryans from the Majapahit kingdom to Bali. It results in an architecture called Bali Arya's architecture.) respecting the rules about the cardinal directions in relation to the human anatomy. The wood of the bale pavilions is also originel, with ancient patterns of prada (Note: Prada is the gilding of objects, architecture or cloth. Usually in gold, silver can also be used.) etched into the pillars. Five families of royal descent live there

=== Jatiluwih ===
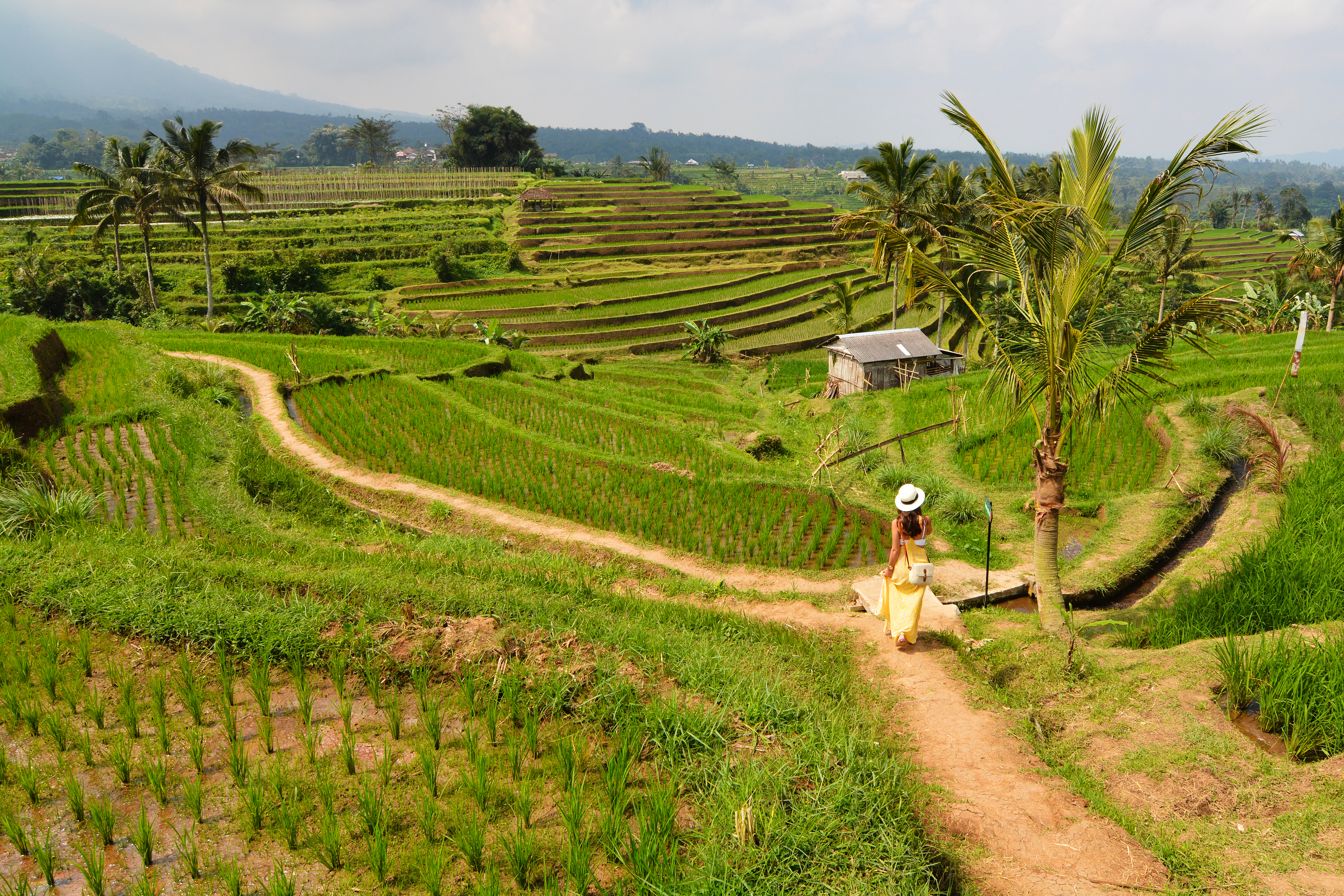
Rice paddies at Jatiluwih

Jatiluwih is an administrative village in Penebel District, north of Tabanan; it is formed with two customary villages, Gunung Sari and Jatiluwih; under these two customary villages there are seven customary hamlets or banjar. The village is at an altitude of 700 meters. Two routes to Jatiluwih are Denpasar > Kediri > Tabanan > Penebel > Jatiluwih or Denpasar > Mengwi > Baturiti > Jatiluwih.

It has terraced paddy fields following the contours of land against the background of Mount Batukaru and Mount Agung. These terraces use the traditional Balinese irrigation known as subak, Bali's community-based water control management system.
Jatiluwih rice terraces are one of the five areas that make up UNESCO's world's cultural heritage site listed for the subak.

In the early 1990s, Jatiluwih was one of three villages chosen for a pilot project aiming at developing village tourism, as an alternative to mass tourism that has been overtaking Bali. The government argued that this project would be under local management and would therefore be of more benefit to the local community. At the time, the initiative failed to attract a significant amount of tourist visits; and the revenues it generated had frequently been a source of conflict. Thus many villagers argued that this tourism project failed to reach its objectives.

== Gallery ==
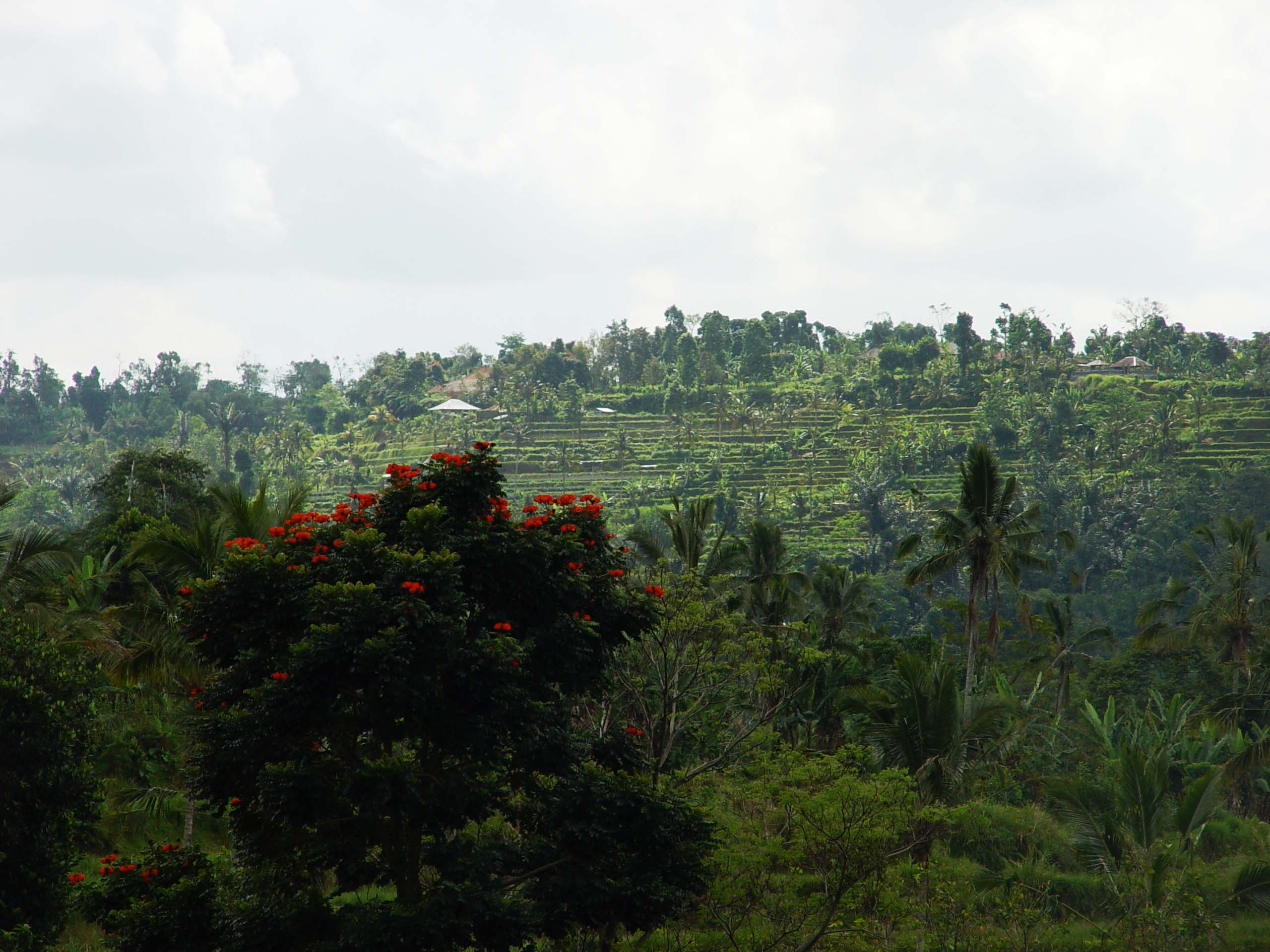
Pacung mountain resort

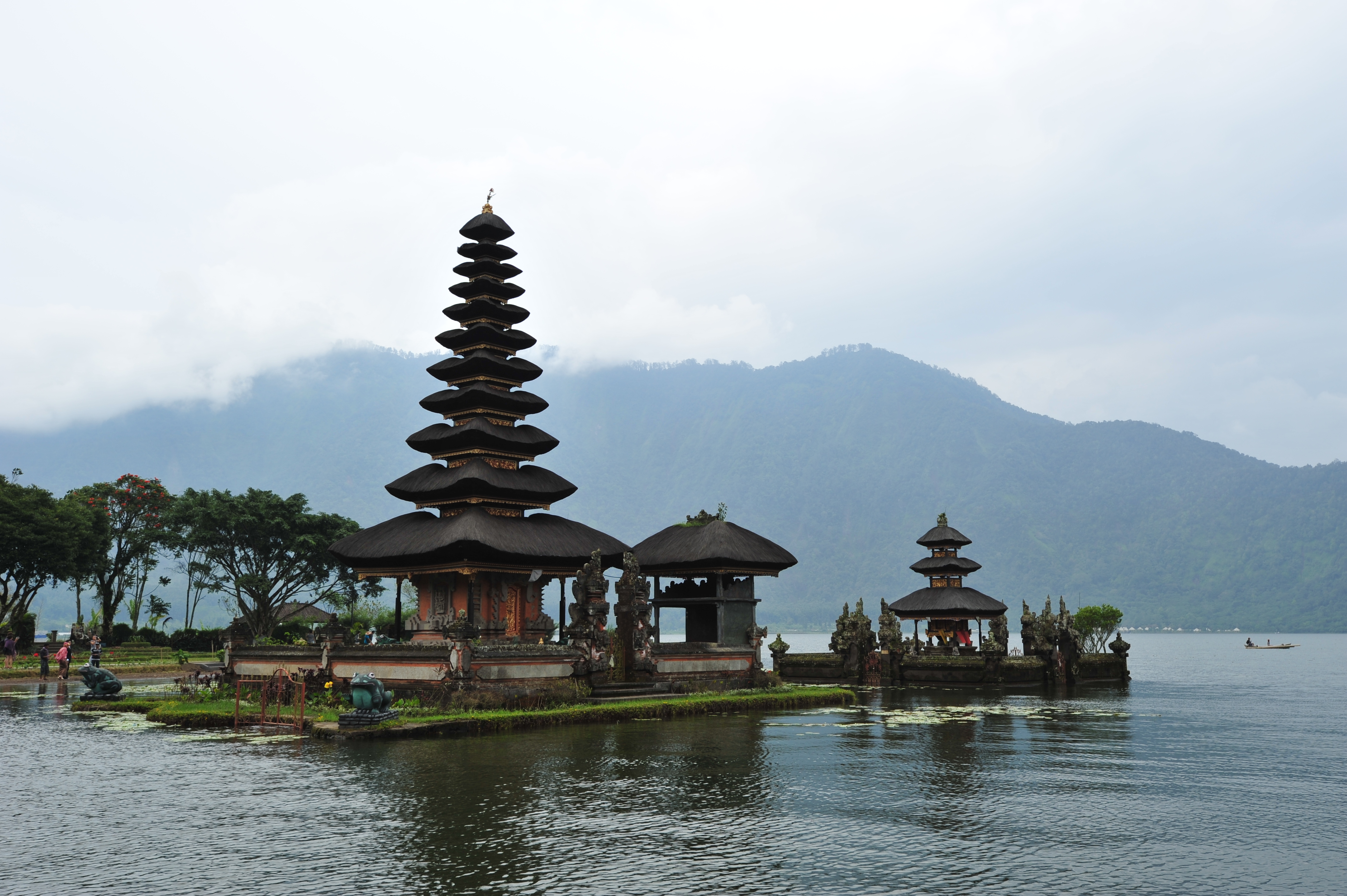
Ulun Danu Bratan Temple

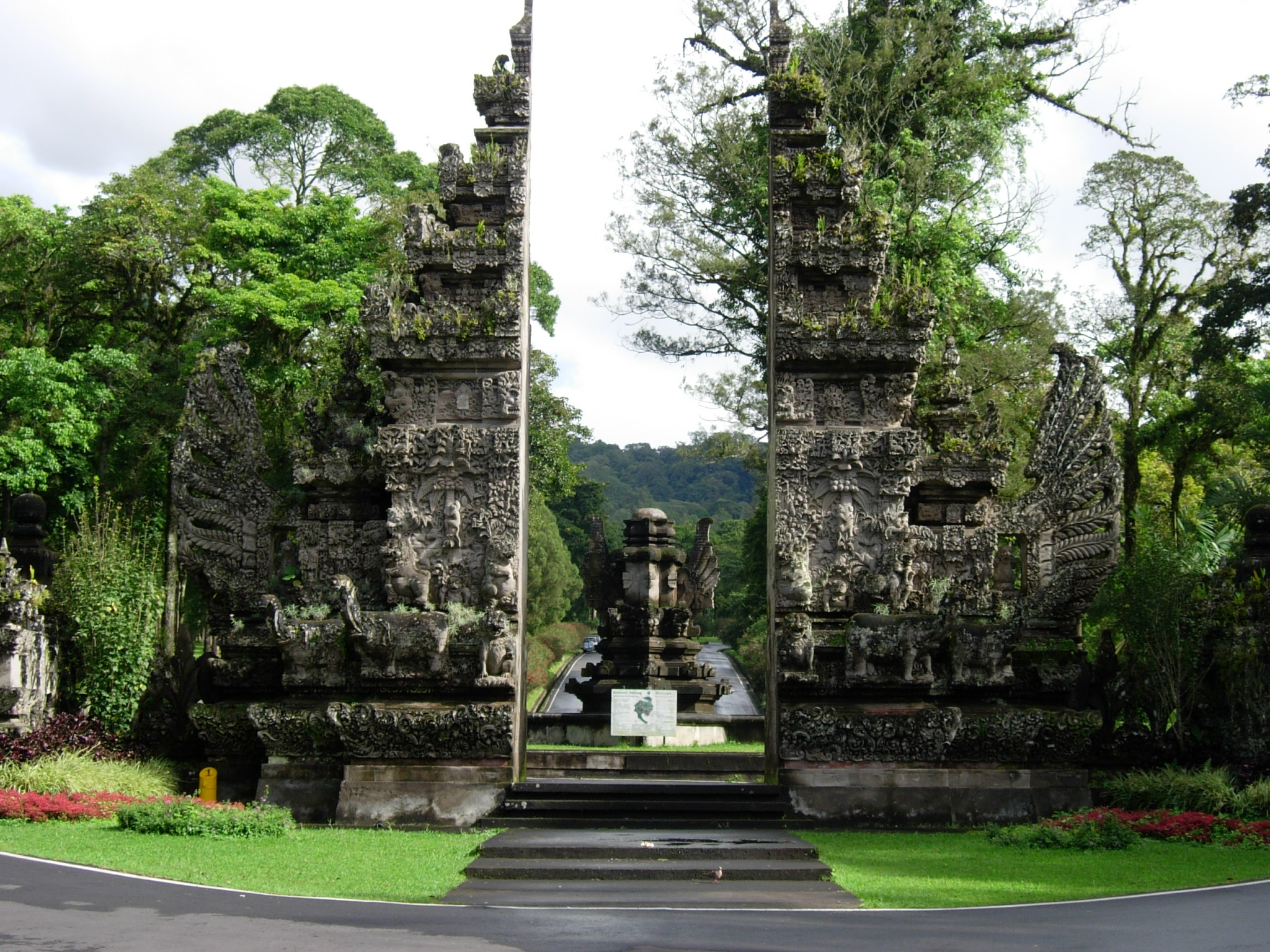
Bali Botanical Gardens

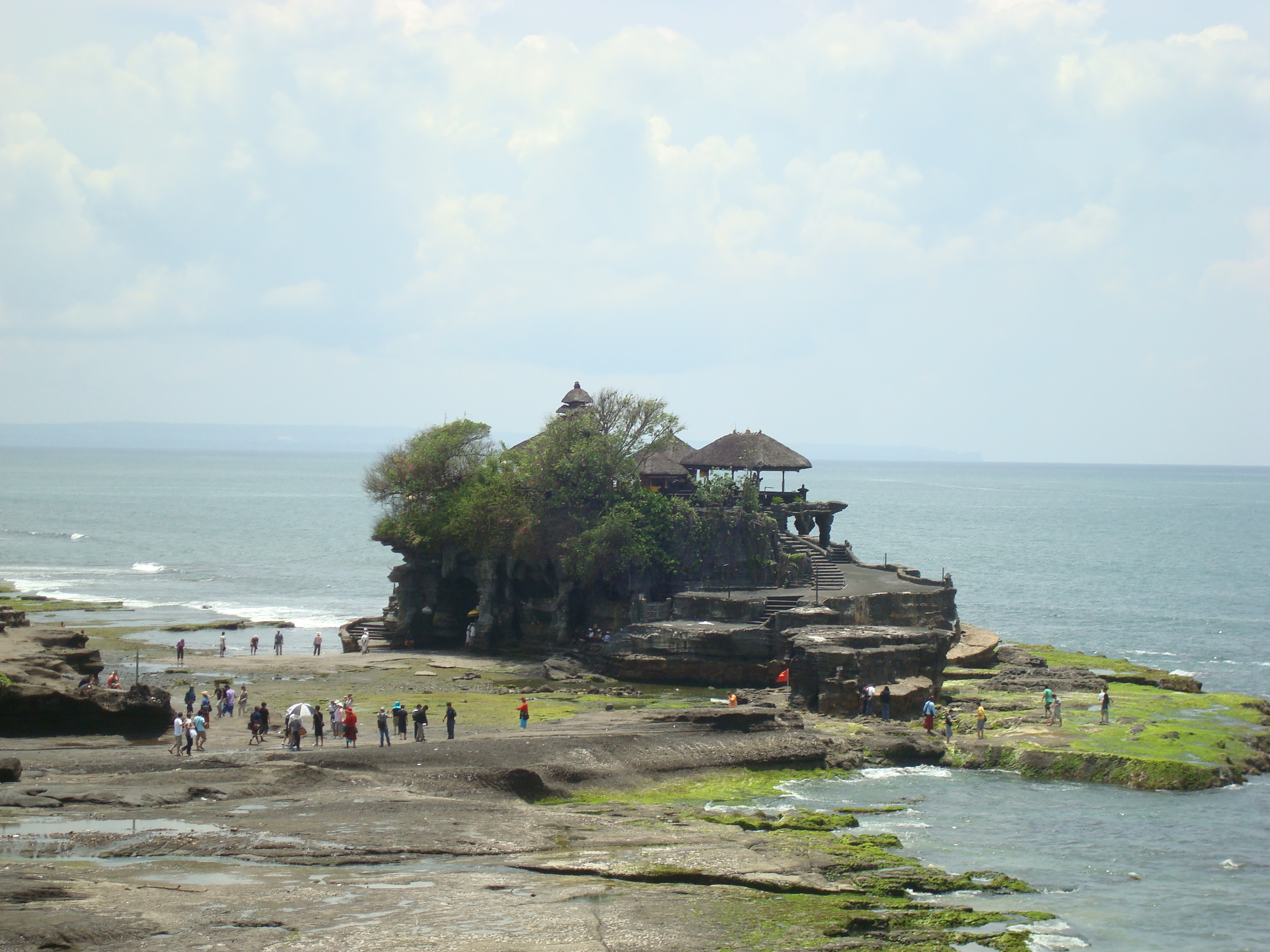
Tanah Lot Temple

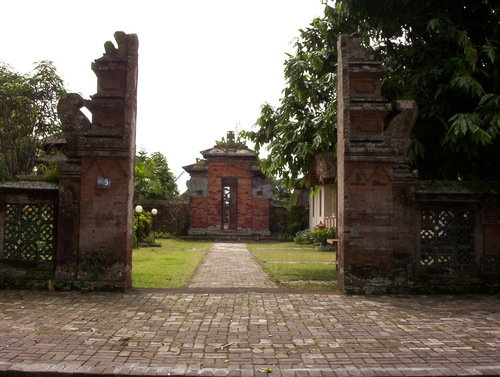
Puri Anom Tabanan

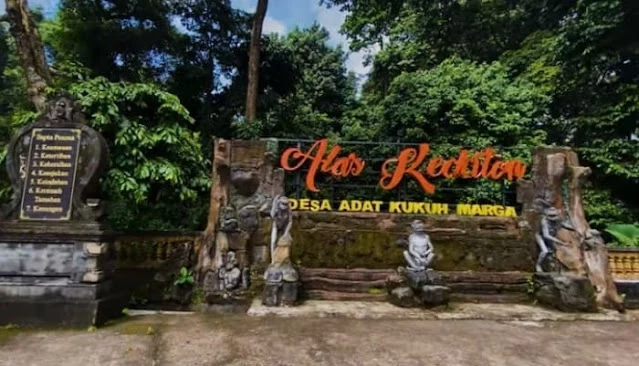
Alas Kedaton

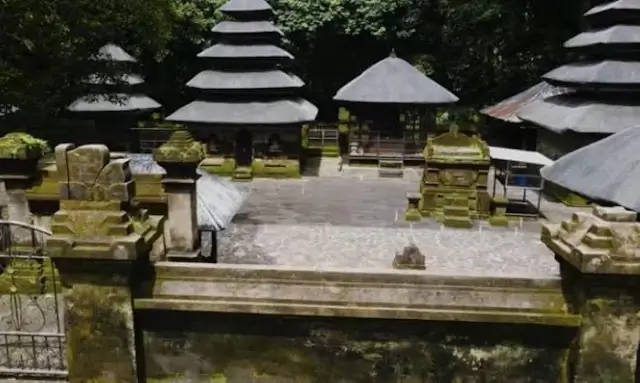
Pura (Temple) in Alas Kedaton

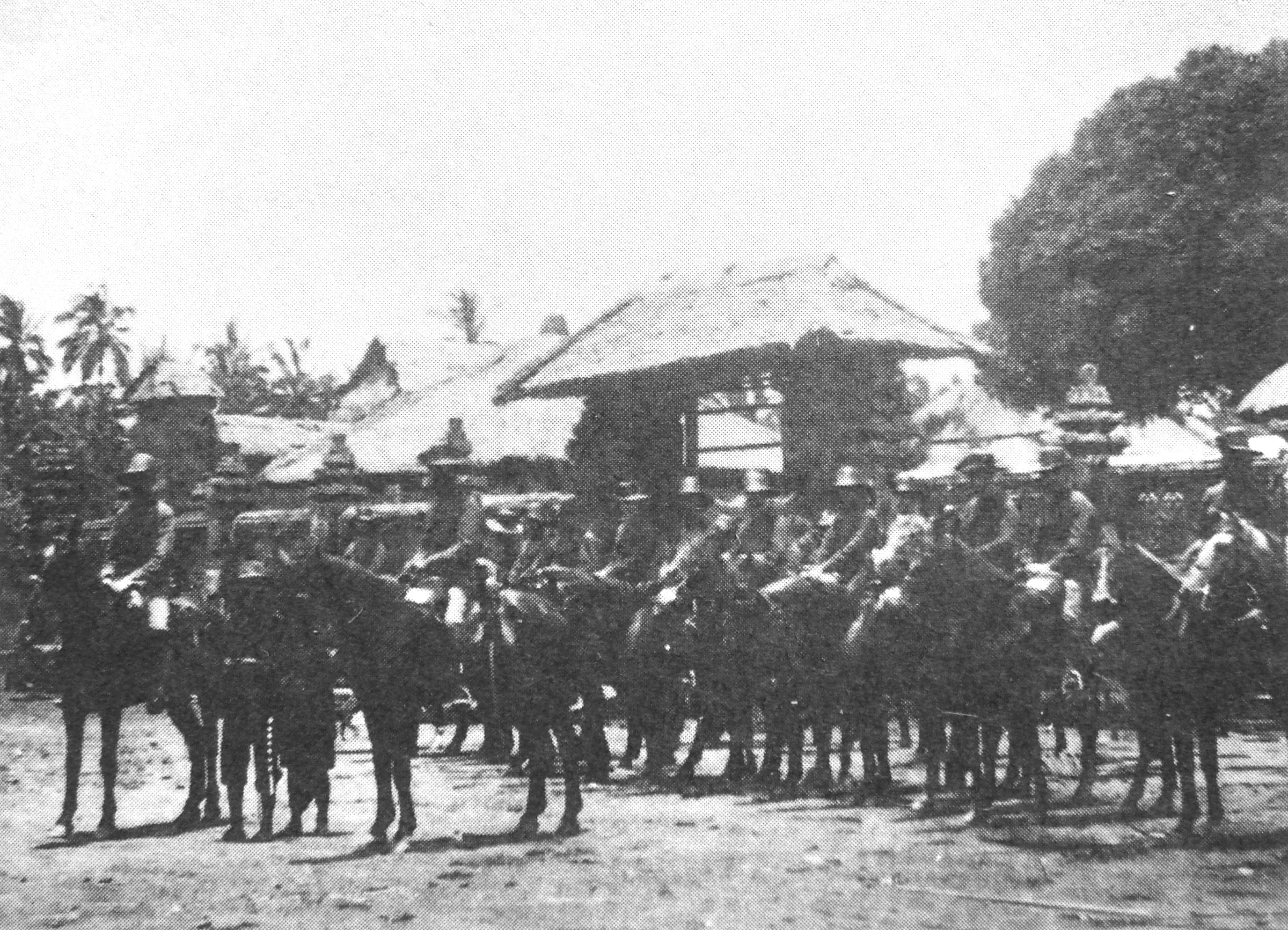
Dutch cavalry in front of the Royal Palace at Tabanan during the Dutch intervention in Bali (1906)
