= Sri Kesari Warmadewa =

King of Bali

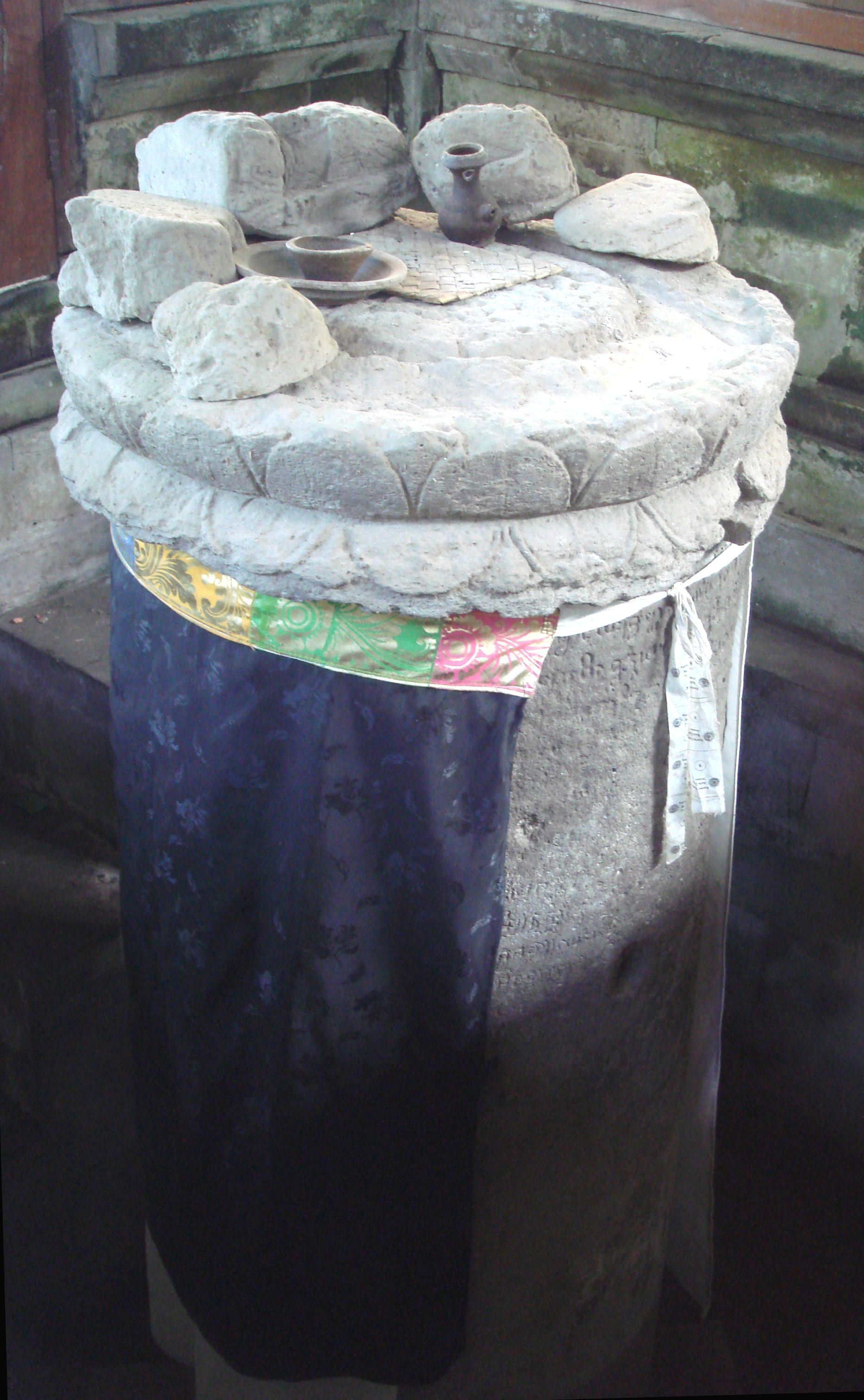
The Belanjong pillar in Sanur dates to 914 CE, and testifies to the contacts between Bali and the Indian subcontinent.

Sri Kesari Warmadewa (spelled Śrī Kesarī Varmadeva in IAST transliteration) was the first king of Bali whose name is recorded in a written inscription. He was the issuing authority for four inscriptions, including the famous 914 CE inscription on the Belanjong pillar ("Prasasti Blanjong") in southern Sanur.

== Sources ==
Sri Kesari Warmadewa is known from four inscriptions: the Belanjong pillar inscription, the Penempahan inscription, the Malat Gede inscription, and the Pukuh inscription. All of Sri Kesari's inscriptions are monuments to his military victories (jaya-stambha), against enemies at Gurun and Suwal (conjectured to be overseas islands) and "in the north" (kadya-kadya), probably referring to the mountainous regions of Bali.

The Belanjong pillar inscription is written in both the Sanskrit language and Old Balinese language, using two scripts, the Nagari script and the Old Balinese script (which is used to write both Balinese and Sanskrit). It is dated according to the Indian Shaka era, which Damais has converted to 4 February 914 CE.

The three other inscriptions contain parallel versions of the same text in the Old Balinese language, which are presented here side by side. Dashes indicate illegible letter forms, parentheses indicate conjectural readings, and the overring ° indicates the use of the vocalic akṣara.

Old Balinese text
| Penempahan inscription | Malat Gede inscription | Pukuh inscription |
|---|---|---|
| – – – – – – ulan phālguṇa kṛ(ṣṇa) | – śaka 835 wulan phalguna kṛsṇa – pakṣa | i śaka 835 wulan (pha)lguṇa k(ṛ)sna pa(k)ṣa pu |
| – – – rṇa j– śri kaisari °ūliḥ | kittan parhajyan śṛi ke– – – | tha(-)ras(ka) parhajyan śri khesari laḥ me la – – |
| – – –usuḥ – – ṅkas da watu ri wacit | – – ta musuh ro – (ngi) – tas bhagu – – – | hli musuḥ ka ingkaḥ sda – – – cihnan – – – |
| – – – kadya kadya maka tka- di tuṅgala– | – –kadya kadya maksa – – – – – – – | wudpa kadya kadya maka tka di tuṅgalan |

The Old Balinese text is obscure in some parts, especially in the third line. What follows is not a literal translation but an approximate paraphrase in English:

In Śaka 835, the month Phalguna, the waning half... [i.e. 13–27 February 914]

... the palace [or: "kingship"] of Śrī Kesarī ...

... enemies were undone ... [Pukuh: "a sign that"]

... in the north, until [they] arrived at unity [or: "at Tunggalan"]

== Reign ==
Sri Kesari is the first Balinese king whose name appears in inscriptions. The Belanjong pillar gives his name as Śrī Kesarī Varma(deva) (A.4 & B.13). The -deva part of the name does not appear clearly on the stone but is a conjecture based on the common use of the title Varmadeva in later Balinese inscriptions. In the other inscriptions, his name is abbreviated to Śri Kesari, alternatively spelled Śri Khesari and Śri Kaisari. Sri Kesari's title in the Blanjong pillar is samasta-samanta-adhipatiḥ (B.13), which is best translated as "universal sovereign", rather than its later meanings of "governor" or "vizier".

Sri Kesari is the first Balinese king to use the Warmadewa title (if the conjectural -deva reading is accepted), and so he is often considered the founder of the Warmadewa dynasty. Several generations of later Balinese kings used this title, including the famous king Udayana Warmadewa. However, there is little explicit information about how the various monarchs called Warmadewa were related to each other. The term "dynasty", in this context, therefore refers generally to a group of monarchs who share a common element in their titles, rather than a hereditary lineage (see the article on the Warmadewa dynasty for more details).

All inscriptions from Sri Kesari's reign were issued in the month of Phalguna of the Śaka year 835, which is roughly equivalent to February 914 CE. There are no named kings in earlier Balinese inscriptions, so it is not possible to set a limit on how early Sri Kesari's reign began. The earliest inscription of the next Balinese king Ugrasena is dated 12 July 915, so it can be inferred that Sri Kesari's reign ended sometime between February 914 and July 915 CE.

In the Belanjong pillar, there are geographical references to the "island of Bali" (Vāli-dvīpa, B.2) and to a palace called Siṁhadvāla, though Damais read it Siṁhārccala (A.3). This may be the name of Sri Kesari's palace (parhajyan) mentioned in the other inscriptions. Some historians often identify Siṁhadvāla with the Siṁhamandava mentioned in earlier inscriptions, which is believed to be somewhere in central Bali. The National History of Indonesia, Revised Edition states that "it is not yet clear how Singhadwāla and Singhamandawa were connected".

It has been speculated that Sri Kesari was a Buddhist king of the Sailendra Dynasty leading a military expedition, to establish a Mahayana Buddhist government in Bali. However, this theory is not supported by explicit evidence from Sri Kesari's own inscriptions.

== See also ==
- History of Bali
- Belanjong pillar
- Warmadewa dynasty

== Notes ==
| Preceded by - | Balinese Monarchs; 914 CE | Succeeded by Sri Ugrasena |
