= Archaeological Survey of Burma =

Government agency

- မြန်မာ့ သမိုင်းသုတေသနဌာန

Agency overview
- Formed: 1902
- Dissolved: 1988
- Superseding agency: Department of Archaeology and National Museum (Myanmar)
- Type: Government department
- Jurisdiction: Government of Burma (now Myanmar)
- Status: Defunct
- Headquarters: Rangoon, Burma
- Parent department: Archaeological Survey of India (1902-1937); Ministry of Culture

The Archaeological Survey of Burma was a government agency responsible for archaeological research, conservation and preservation of cultural monuments in Burma. It was established in 1902 by British authorities, following a visit by Lord Curzon, Viceroy of India to Burma Province in 1901. Several noted Burmese scholars, including Gordon Luce and Pe Maung Tin, published for the agency. The functions of the agency has since been assumed by Ministry of Religious Affairs and Culture's Department of Archaeology and National Museum.

== Publications ==
- Report of the Superintendent, Archaeological Survey, Burma
- Report of the Director, Archaeological Survey of Burma

== Directors ==
- Emil Forchhammer
- Taw Sein Ko
- Charles Duroiselle
- Lu Pe Win
- Aung Thaw
- Oak Gar

== See also ==
- Archaeological Survey of India
