= Nāgarī script =

Abugida

Nāgarī
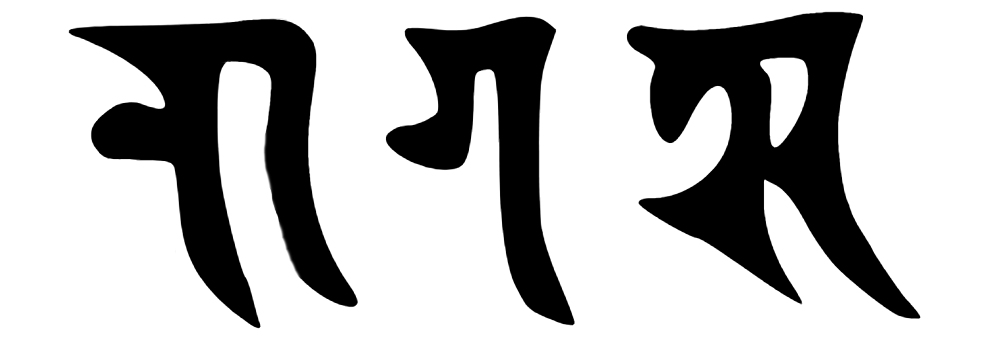
- The word Nāgarī in the Nāgarī script.
- Script type: Abugida
- Period: c. 980-1010 CE
- Languages: Sanskrit; Prakrit

Related scripts
- Parent systems: Proto-Sinaitic alphabet: Phoenician alphabet; Aramaic alphabet (debated); Brahmi; Gupta; Siddhaṃ; Nāgarī
- Child systems: Devanagari; Kaithi; Nandinagari; Sylheti Nagri; Gujarati; Modi
- Sister systems: Bengali-Assamese script, Odia script, Nepalese

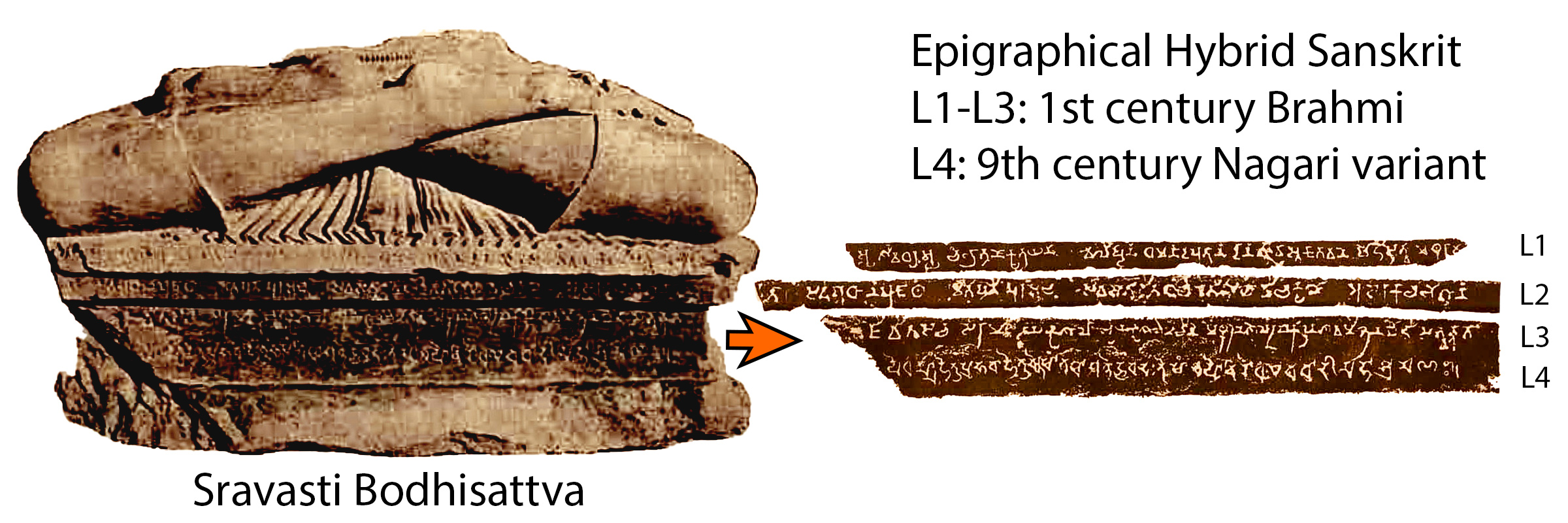
Shravasti Bodhisattva statue with 1st-century Brahmi script (first three lines) and 9th-century Nagari script (last line).

The Nāgarī script or Early Nagari is the ancestor of Devanagari, Nandinagari and other variants, and was first used to write Prakrit and Sanskrit. The term is sometimes used as a synonym for Devanagari script. It came in vogue during the first millennium CE.

The Nāgarī script has roots in the ancient Brahmi script family. The Nāgarī script was in regular use by 7th century CE, and had fully evolved into Devanagari and Nandinagari scripts by about the end of first millennium of the common era.

== Etymology ==
Nagari is a vṛddhi derivation from नगर (nagara), which means city.

== History ==
=== Origins ===
Nāgarī belongs to the Brahmic family of scripts. It is part of the northern branch of the Indian Brahmic scripts. Singh (1991) traces the development of Nāgarī through Mauryan Brāhmī and continuing through the regional varieties conventionally designated as Śuṅga, Kṣatrapa, Kuṣāṇa, Gupta and Later Gupta scripts. Changes in writing technique affected the development of the shape of the early script. The increasing use of cursive writing encouraged changes from angular to more rounded or flowing forms, while different writing materials, including stone, copper plates, birch-bark and palm leaf, affected the appearance of individual letters. Scribal habits and regional traditions further contributed to variation.

By the 6th century 'Kuṭila' or 'Siddhamātṛkā', a descendant from the Gupta script, forms as a major intermediate stage in the northern Indian Brahmic script tradition. Changes in its consonants, vowels, medial signs and ligatures can be traced towards later Nāgarī forms. By the end of the seventh century A.D. the proto-Nagari script developed in the region of Malwa. This Proto-Nagari script shows broader triangular head-marks, or replaces them with a small stroke; and tails or footmarks are added to the bottom of the letters. The Kuṭila script developed its final form between the ninth and tenth centuries, and subsequently transforms into a mature form of the Nagari script. Scholars disagree on the exact point in time of this transition. During this period, forms displaying characteristic features of Nāgarī became increasingly widespread. Among these was the increasing prominence of the horizontal head-line, alongside changes in the proportions and shapes of consonants and vowel signs. These features did not appear simultaneously in every region, and different areas retained older forms while developing other new features.

Singh identifies the 11th to 13th centuries as the age of maturity of the Nāgarī script. By this period its principal characteristics such as the top-stroke, straight vertical line, halanta sign, uniform medial signs and mutilated initial consonant in ligatures had become established. The earliest attestations of the mature Nāgarī script date to 983 and 1008 AD. The script was in use in the Ganges Valley, Central India, Rajasthan, Gujarat, Western India and the Deccan by the 11th century AD.

=== Regional varieties and descendant scripts ===
The maturation of Nāgarī was accompanied by the emergence of regional forms. These should not be understood as the products of a single branching event, since the relationships among the various scripts were shaped by regional writing traditions and continued to change over time.

In northern and central India, Nāgarī became increasingly associated with Sanskrit and eventually with a number of regional languages. The form subsequently known as Devanāgarī became the principal standardized form of the Nagari tradition. Salomon places the development of standardized Devanāgarī around the end of the first millennium, while noting that regional and chronological variation continued.

Nandināgarī represents an important southern form of the Nāgarī tradition. It was used particularly for Sanskrit manuscripts and inscriptions in southern India and the Deccan. Singh distinguishes Nandināgarī from Nāgarī and Jaina-Nāgarī in his comparative palaeographic material, showing both its relationship to the wider Nāgarī tradition and its distinctive letter forms.

In western India, the Gujarati script developed from a Nāgarī-derived writing tradition. Singh associates Gujarati and other cursive scripts with the practical requirements of rapid handwriting. Salomon likewise identifies Gujarati as one of the local scripts that developed out of Nāgarī, alongside scripts such as Moḍī and Kāyethī. The modern Gujarati script became visually distinct from Nāgarī, most notably through the disappearance of the continuous horizontal head-line.

== Usage outside India ==
Inscriptions in early forms of the Nagari script are also found outside of India, in Sri Lanka, Burma and Indonesia. The Belanjong pillar found on Bali, features a 10th century Nagari inscription.

Although the Kawi script was the dominant script used in the great majority of inscriptions on Java, a small number of Sanskrit inscriptions in the south-central regions of the island are written in the Early Nāgarī script. The earliest inscriptions found in Early Nāgarī are from around the 10th century CE, with many more between the 11th and 14th centuries. Some of the old-Devanāgarī inscriptions are found in Hindu temples of Java, such as the Prambanan temple. The Ligor and the Kalasan inscriptions of central Java, dated to the 8th century, are also in the Nāgarī script of north India. According to the epigraphist and Asian Studies scholar Lawrence Briggs, these may be related to the 9th century copper plate inscription of Devapaladeva (Bengal) which is also in early Devanāgarī script. The term kawi in Kawi script is a loan word from kāvya (poetry). According to anthropologists and Asian studies scholars John Norman Miksic and Goh Geok Yian, the 8th-century version of early Nāgarī or Devanāgarī script was adopted in Java, Bali, and Khmer around the 8th–9th centuries, as evidenced by the many contemporaneous inscriptions of this period.

The 7th century Tibetan king Songtsen Gampo ordered that all foreign books be transcribed into the Tibetan language, and sent his ambassador Tonmi Sambota to India to acquire alphabetic and writing methods, who returned with a Sanskrit Nāgarī script from Kashmir corresponding to twenty-four (24) Tibetan sounds and innovating new symbols for six (6) local sounds.

The museum in Mrauk-u (Mrohaung) in the Rakhine state of Myanmar held in 1972 two examples of Nāgarī script. Archaeologist Aung Thaw describes these inscriptions, associated with the Chandra, or Candra, dynasty that first hailed from the ancient Indian city of Vesáli:

... epigraphs in mixed Sanskrit and Pali in North-eastern Nāgarī script of the 6th century dedicated by [Queen] Niti Candra and [King] Vira Candra

— Aung Thaw, Historical sites in Burma (1972)

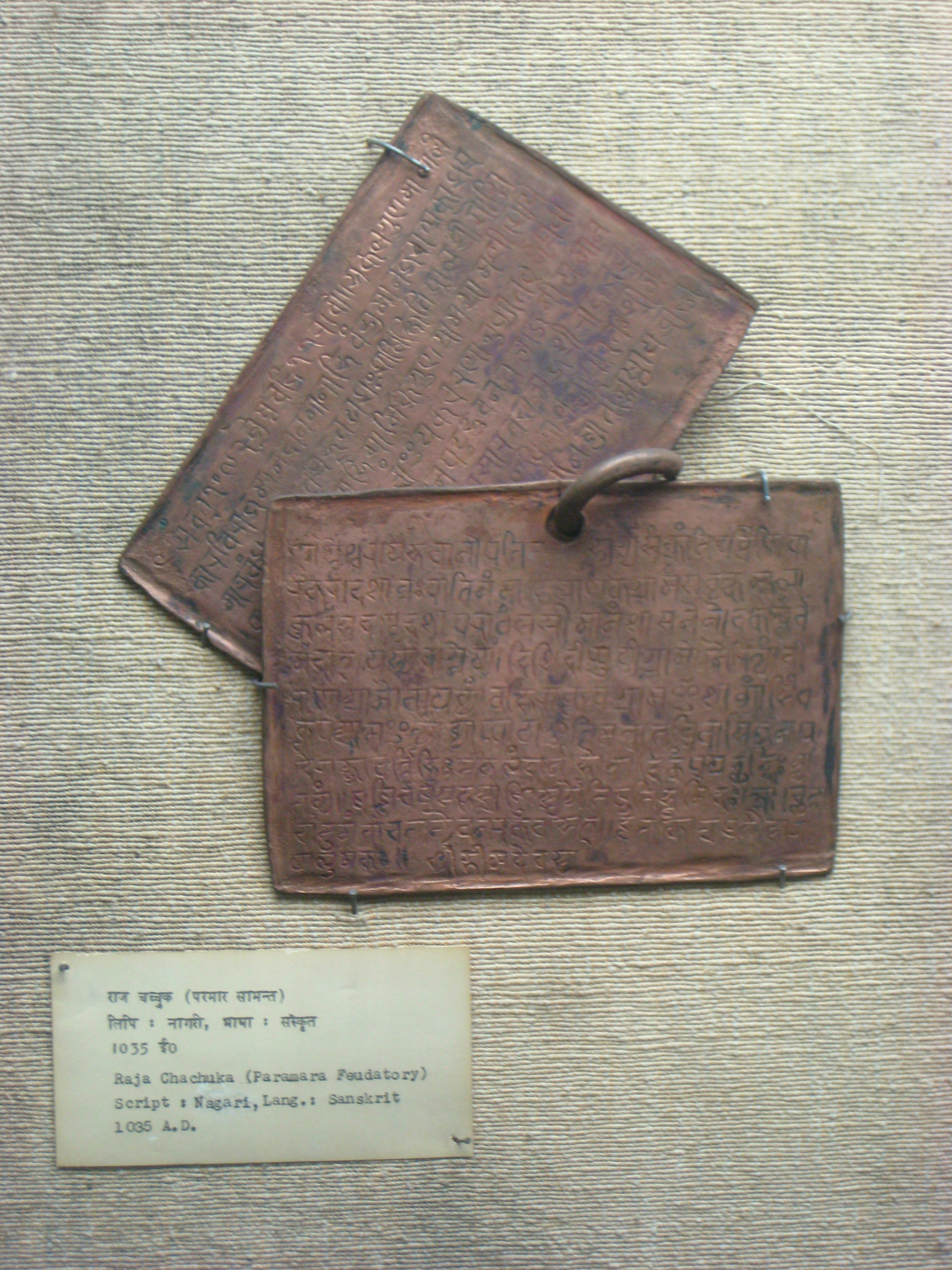
Coppern plates in Nāgarī script, 1035 CE

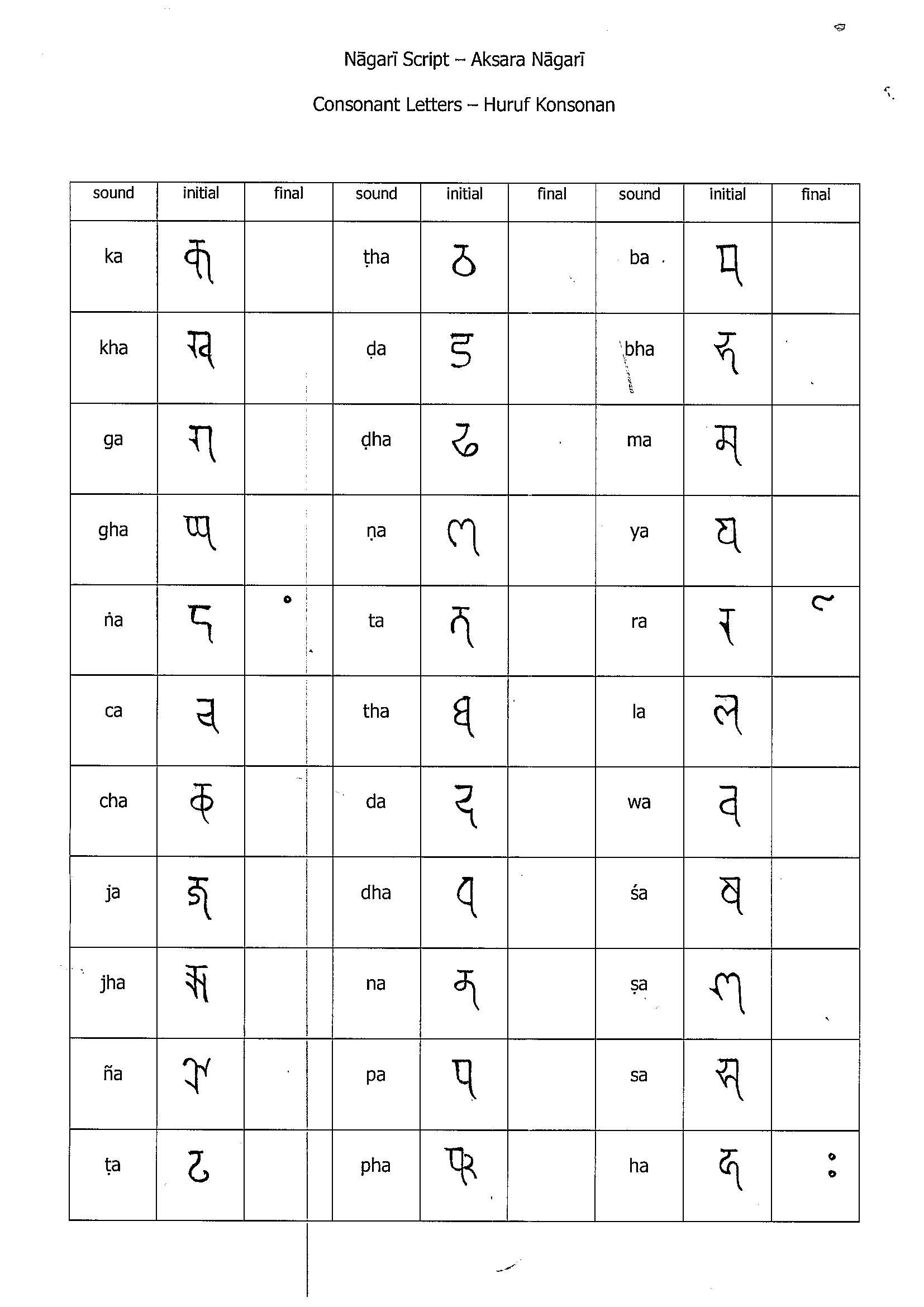
Nagari Script 01

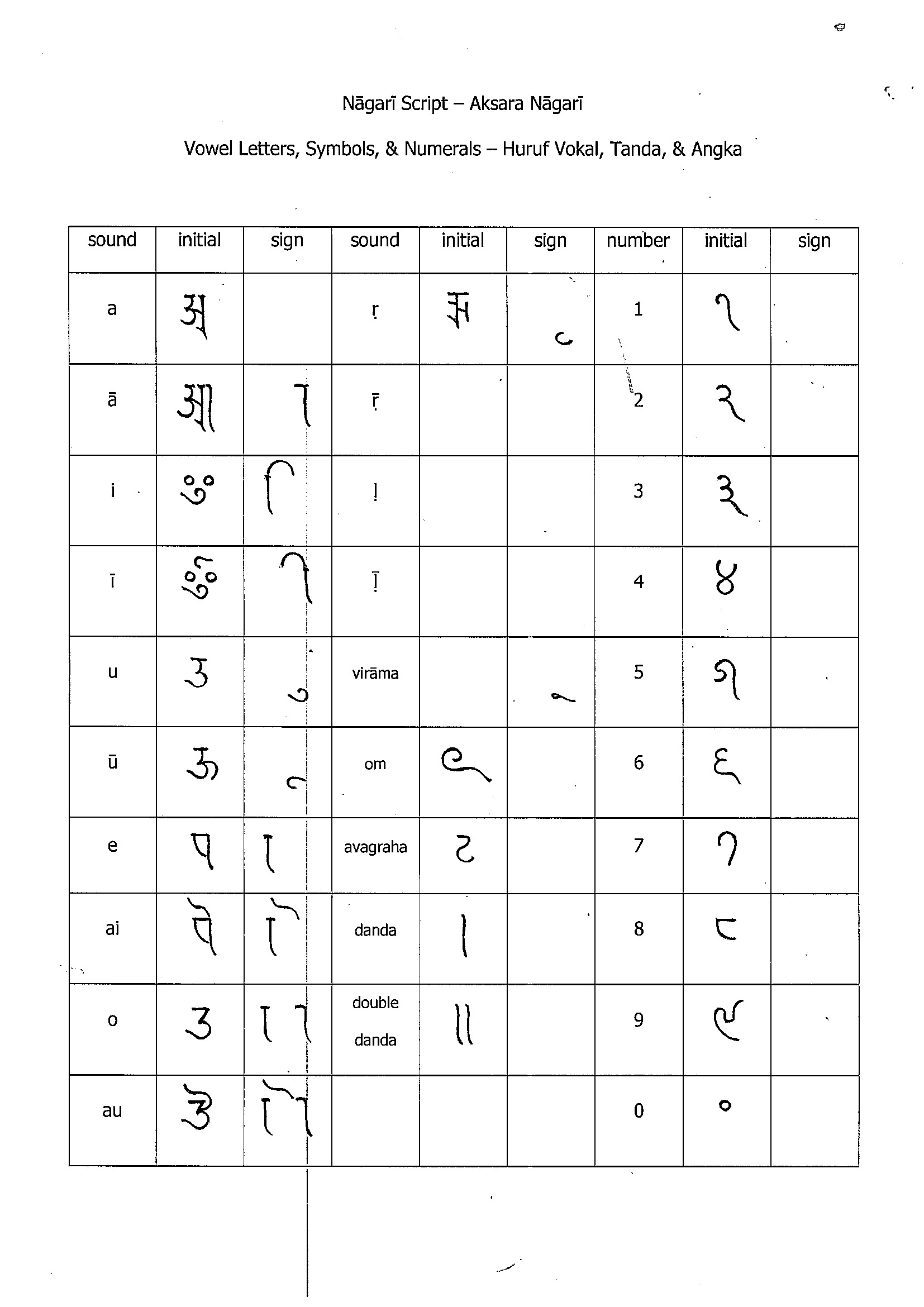
Nagari Script 02

== See also ==
- Nandinagari
- Sylheti Nagri
- Eastern Nagari
- Lipi
