= Belanjong pillar =

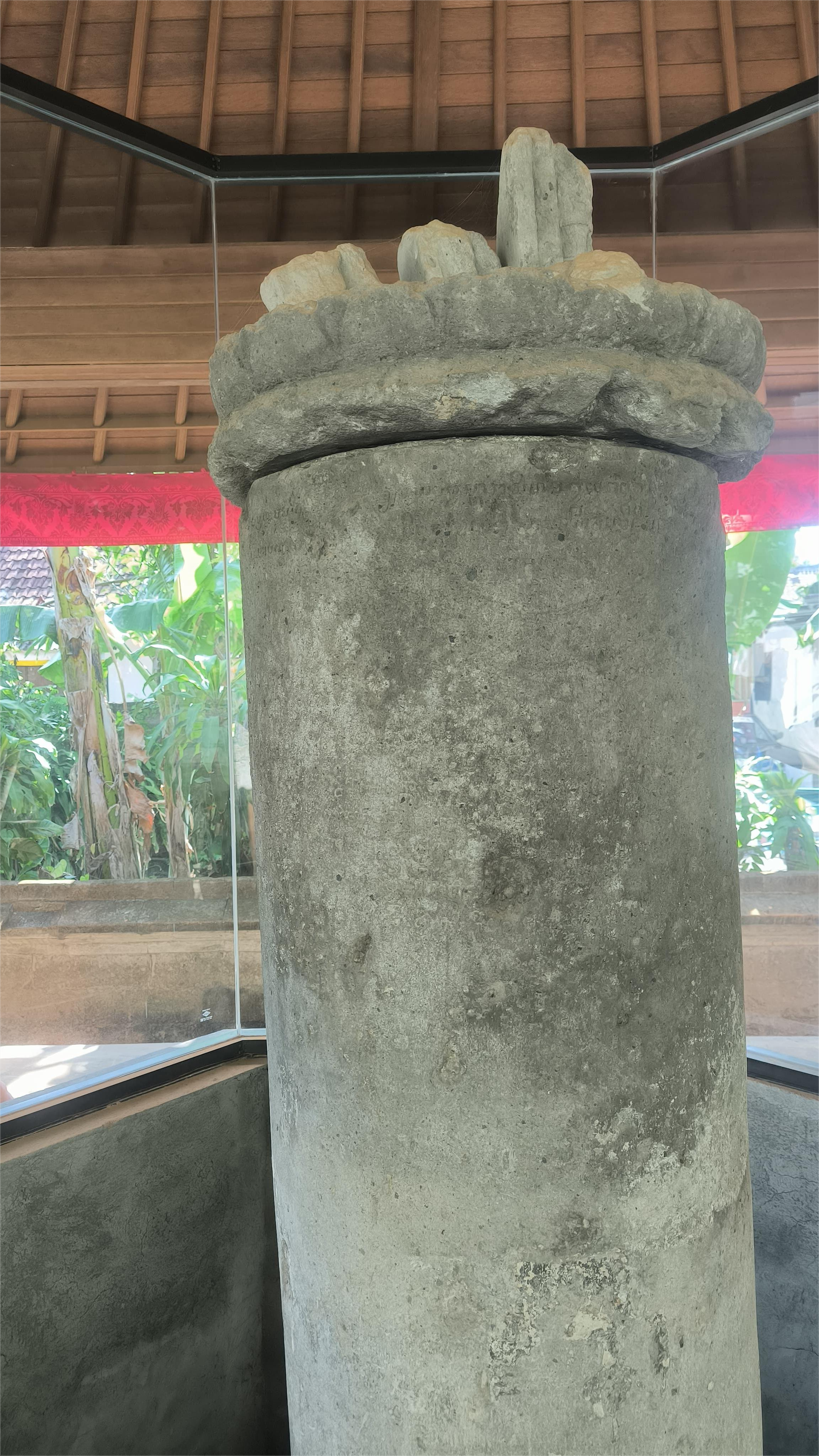
- The Belanjong pillar in Sanur dates to 914 CE, testifies to the contacts between Bali, Java and the Indian subcontinent.
- Material: Andesite stone
- Writing: Pranagari script in Sanskrit and Old Balinese
- Created: 4 February 914 CE
- Discovered: Belanjong, southern Sanur in Bali, Indonesia
- Present location: In situ (original location)

The Belanjong pillar, also Blanjong pillar or Blanjong inscription (Indonesian: Prasasti Blanjong), is a pillar established in 914 CE in the harbour of Belanjong, in the southern area of Sanur in Bali.

The pillar was established by King Sri Kesari Warmadewa, the first king of the Balinese Warmadewa dynasty, and bears a long inscription where the king describes his military campaign on the island. It is located in the Belanjong (Blanjong) Temple, where it is housed under a protective enclosure and is often decorated and partially covered with devotional cloth.

The pillar was only discovered in 1932, and has remained where it was initially found.

== Language and Date ==
The inscription is written in both the Indian Sanskrit language and Old Balinese language, using two scripts, the Nagari script and the Old Balinese script (which is used to write both Balinese and Sanskrit). The Old Balinese in pre-Nagari script is on one side of the pillar, while the Sanskrit inscription in Pallava-derived old Javanese script (also called Kawi script) is on the other side.

The pillar is dated according to the Indian Shaka era, on the seventh day of the waxing half ('saptāmyāṁ sita') of the month Phalguna of the Śaka year 835, which corresponds to 4 February 914 CE as calculated by Louis-Charles Damais.

== Contents ==
The Blanjong pillar inscription was published by W.F. Stutterheim, whose transliteration was reproduced by Roelof Goris taking into account corrections by Louis-Charles Damais, as follows. Sadly, so much of the writing is damaged that it is difficult to gain a clear sense of the text's meaning. Hyphens indicate illegible letters, parentheses indicate conjectural readings and double slashes indicate a section marker. For variant readings, S indicates a reading by Stutterheim (1934), and D indicates a reading by Damais (1947).

=== Transliteration ===
==== A side (Old Balinese and Sanskrit languages, Nāgarī script) ====
1. śākabde śara-vahni-mūrti-gaṇite māse tathā phalguṇe (sārā) - - -

2. - (rā) - (taki) nasva(kṣā) - rādhāyajihitivārovinihatyavairini - h- ṅ(s) -

3. - - (hī) - (ja)vampuraṅ [S: siṅhadvāla, D: siṅhārccala] pure(nika) - i - ya - - ta - - t -

4. - - // (śa) [S: –, D: 835] vulan phalguṇa - - - - śrī kesarī - - -

5. - - - raḥ di gurun di s(u)val dahumalahaṅ musuḥdho - ṅka - (rana) - - - (tah)di kutarā -

6. nnata - (tabhāja) - kabudhi kabudhi//

==== B side (Sanskrit language, Old Balinese script) ====
1. sva - - raṭapratāpamahi - (h) - - ścodayaḥ dhvastārāti tamaścayo (buga)na

2. - samārggaraṅgapriyaḥ padmoboi - (āṣa)seravirabūdhā(ś)ā - - naḥkṛtiḥ vālidvīpa -

3. - (bhayebhīrovi) - - - (bhe)ri - na(bhū)pa(śa) (śi)nā(r)ā(g)atva - -

4. [illegible]

5. [illegible]

6. [illegible]

7. [illegible]

8. - - - - (śa) - (maśaṅśuta) - - -

9. - - - - (śepra)yātandīśārssyannantāriṣṛ u- - -

10. - - // (vija)yarka(ṇḍantaraṇḍ)antā(pe) kabhājobhṛśam // yenā e

11. - - - - nbhidyā(ṣaṭa)laṅvidhāyuṅgurubhiḥ sarrundhyaśatrūnyudh(i)

12. maha - ha(dv)iparāgrevairimahibhujā(ṅ) ṣṛjutaraḥkamp- - -

13. - ndre(th)a r(amajasa)ptā - ptiḥ samasta-sāmantādhipatiḥ śrī kesarī varmma(deva) - - -

== Interpretation ==
The inscription is severely damaged, so it is difficult to make clear sense of much of the text. It is important to distinguish information explicitly stated in the text from scholars' modern interpretations of those statements. This is the first known Balinese inscription in which a king (adhipatiḥ) recorded his name: Śrī Kesarī Varma(deva), mentioned in A.4 and B.13. The deva part of the name does not appear clearly on the stone, but it is a conjecture based on the common use of the title Varmadeva in later Balinese inscriptions.

There is an apparent reference to the island of Bali, which is called Vāli-dvīpa (B.2). The alternation of b and v is common in Balinese epigraphy. The inscription also mentions "the palace Singhadvāla" (siṅhadvāla-pure, A.3), which many scholars identify with the palace Singhāmandava of earlier Balinese inscriptions.

The inscription also tells about the success of military expeditions against enemies in two places: Gurun and Suwal (A.5). These place names are slightly obscure. Stutterheim suggested that they might refer to offshore islands, with Gurun possibly referring to Nusa Penida. Goris, quoted by I Wayan Ardika, "believed that Gurun was Lombok, and interpreted Suwal as Ketewel beach south of Sukawati in the Gianyar regency". Others have suggested more faraway places such as Maluku, but it is unclear what evidence this suggestion is grounded on.

Pringle has argued that the mix of language and script suggests that the objective of the inscription was not to communicate locally to the Balinese people, but rather to be established as a symbol of power and authority.

According to the French historian George Coedès, who was referring in general to Balinese inscriptions of the period 884-939 CE:

"These inscriptions reveal an Indo-Balinese society that was independent of Java, used a dialect peculiar to the island, and practiced Buddhism and Sivaism at the same time"

— George Coedès.

Some have suggested that the Blanjong pillar testifies to the connections of Bali with the Sanjaya dynasty in Central Java. However, there is no explicit reference to Javanese kings in the inscription.

It has been speculated that Sri Kesari was a Buddhist king of the Sailendra dynasty leading a military expedition, to establish a Mahayana Buddhist government in Bali. However, there is no explicit evidence for this interpretation in the inscription itself.

Three other inscriptions by Kesari are known in the interior of Bali, which suggests either that there were conflicts in the interior of the island, or that Śrī Kesarī's power was centered in the interior.

== Gallery ==
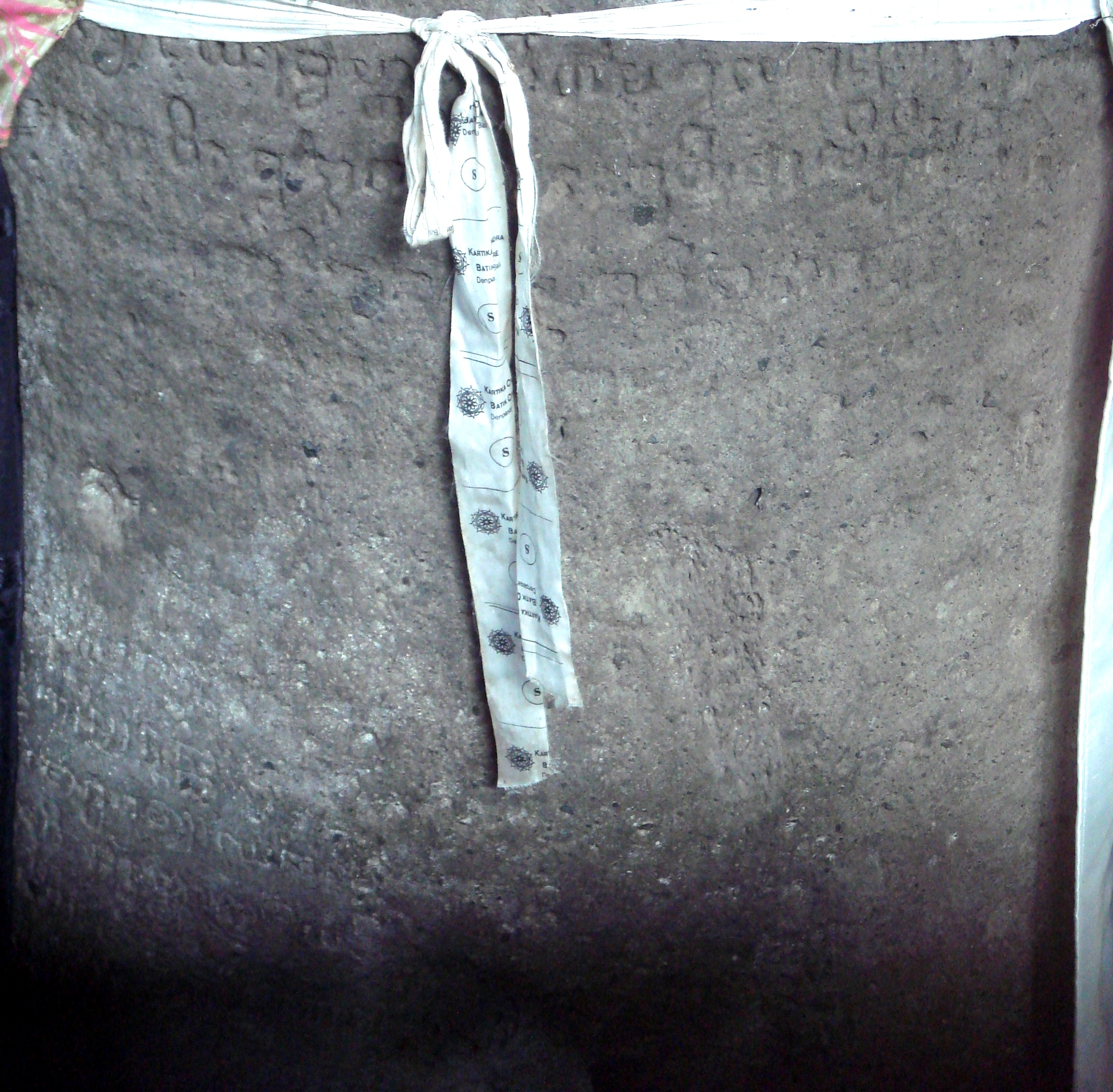
Part of the inscription on the top of the pillar.

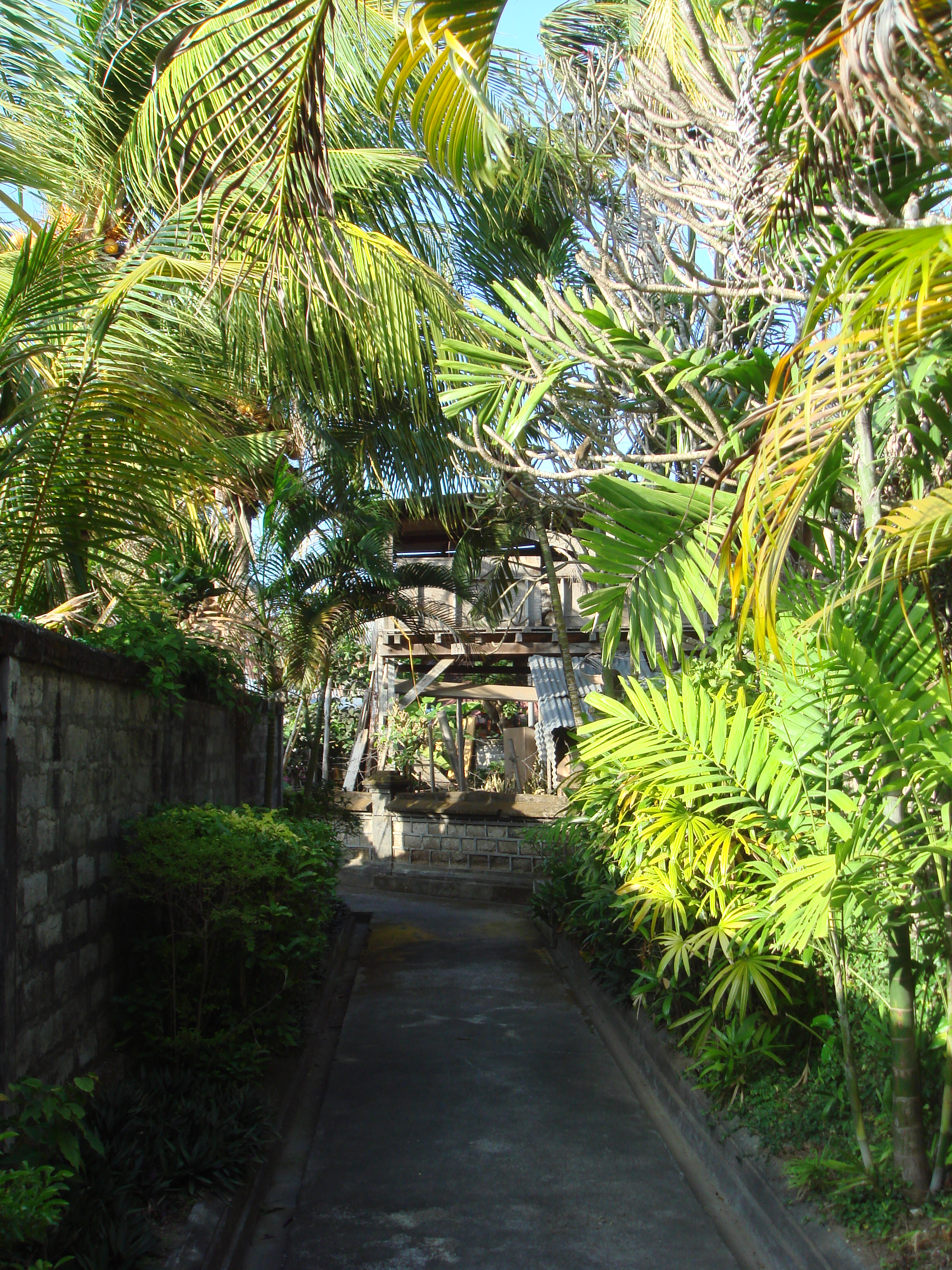
The alley leading to the Belanjong pillar in Belanjong temple.

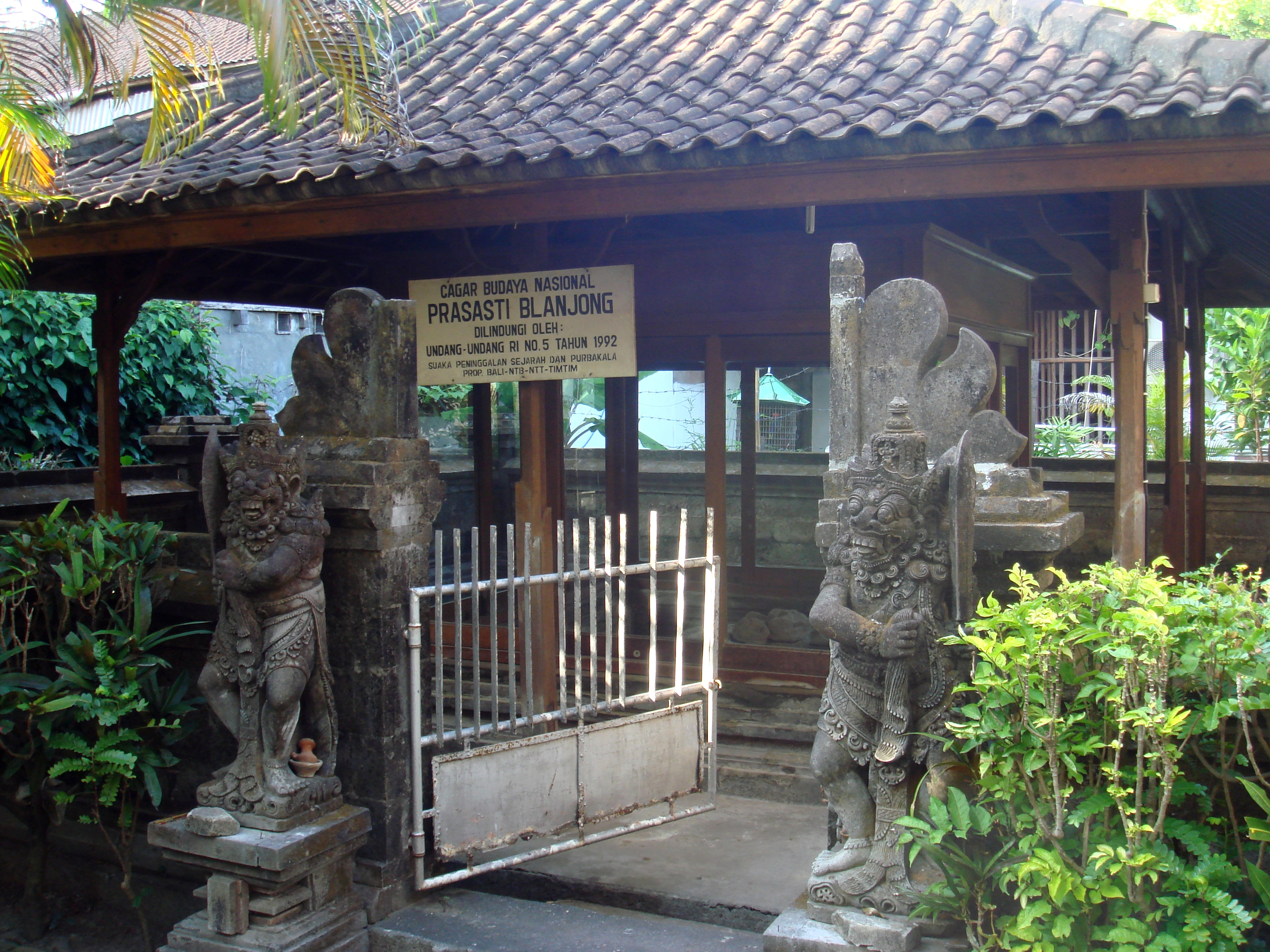
Protective enclosure for the Belanjong pillar, in Belanjong temple.

== See also ==
- History of Bali
- Sri Kesari Warmadewa
