= Charles Duroiselle =

French-born Burmese historian and archaeologist

- Born: 1871
- Died: 1951 (aged 79–80)

Academic work
- Discipline: Historian
- Sub-discipline: Burmese history
- Institutions: University of Rangoon
- Notable students: Pe Maung Tin

Charles Duroiselle (1871–1951) was a French-born Burmese historian and archaeologist. He was a noted Pali scholar and epigrapher, and published monographs on Mandalay Palace and other related Burmese subjects. Throughout his career, excavated over 120 monuments; his findings and acquisitions were meticulously documented and published in annual reports.

== Career ==
A member of the École française d'Extrême-Orient, he served as a professor of Pali at the University of Rangoon. He also served as a Superintendent, Archaeological Survey of Burma from 1912 to 1940, succeeding Taw Sein Ko. In March 1910, he co-founded the Burma Research Society along with colleagues including John Sydenham Furnivall, May Oung, and Pe Maung Tin. The following year, the Journal of the Burma Research Society, was launched. He retired in 1939.

== Publications ==
- A practical grammar of the Pāli language (1906)
- Jinacarita, or, The career of the conqueror: a Pāli poem (1906)
- Epigraphia Birmanica (1919)
- A list of inscriptions found in Burma (1921)
- Guide to the Mandalay Palace (1925)
- The Ānanda temple at Pagan (1937)
