= Bali International School =

School in Bali, Indonesia

Coordinates: 8.6795°S 115.2569°E

Bali Island School (BIS) formerly "Bali International School" is an international school in Sanur, an area of Denpasar, Bali. It serves grades Preschool-12 and has about 300 students. It first opened in 1986, as the Yayasan Bali International School. By 1992 it had 150 students.

== Curriculum ==
Bali International School has the IB International Baccalaureate program from ages 3 to 18.

== Student demographics ==
As of 1992 many students had citizenship in multiple countries, and many of them had at least one parent each who was an Indonesian. As of that year most of its students were citizens of Australia, European countries, and North American countries.
