= Sanur, Bali =

Sanur
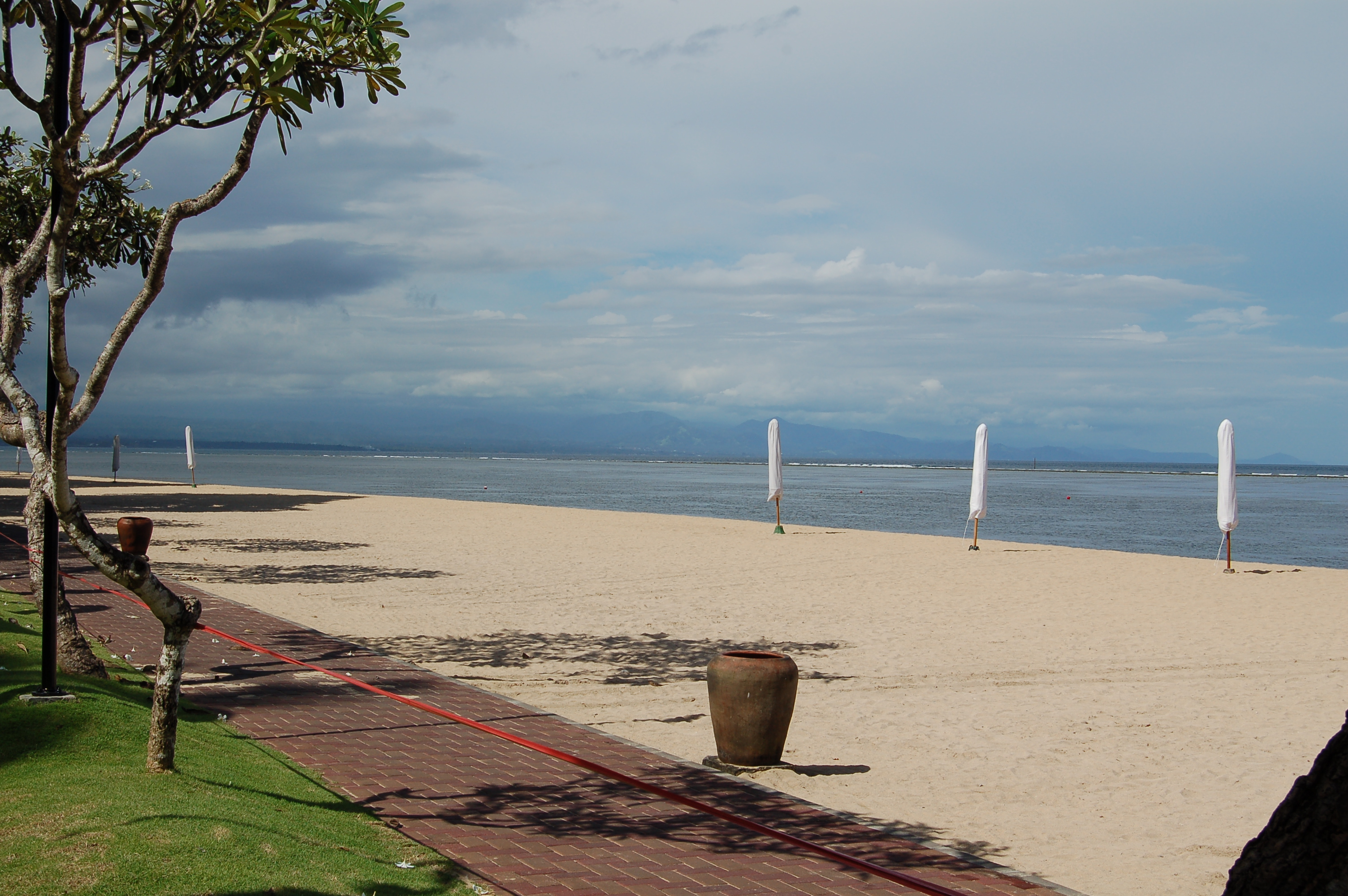
- Beach outside the Hyatt Regency Bali looking north towards Mount Agung (concealed by clouds)

- Location in Denpasar Location in Bali
- Coordinates: 8°41′S 115°16′E
- Country: Indonesia
- Province: Bali
- City: Denpasar
- Time zone: UTC+08:00

Sanur (Balinese: ᬧᬲᬶᬄᬲᬦᬸᬃ, Pasih Sanur; Indonesian: Pantai Sanur, pronounced sah-noor) is a coastal stretch of beach east of Denpasar in southeast Bali (about a 30-minute drive from Ngurah Rai International Airport), which has grown into a little town in its own right. A 5.1 km (3.2 mi) area of Sanur's coastline, from Matahari Terbit Beach to Mertasari Beach, was reclaimed in 2008.

== History ==
=== Prehistory ===
The Sanur stone park near Sanur gathers megaliths dating from the middle of the Bronze Age, collected from diverse places on Bali, as well as recent copies of such stones. The original megaliths were processed with stone tools - which allows them to be distinguished from the recent copies processed with more recent tools - and are evidence of the long human occupation of the island by the Bali Aga people. They come in par with the megalithic stoneworks found in the village of Pedawa (Buleleng Regency).

=== 20th century ===
In 1906 the northern part of Sanur Beach was used as the landing site for the Dutch invasion troops during the intervention in Bali. During World War II, Sanur was again the entry point through which the Japanese forces landed to occupy the island of Bali.

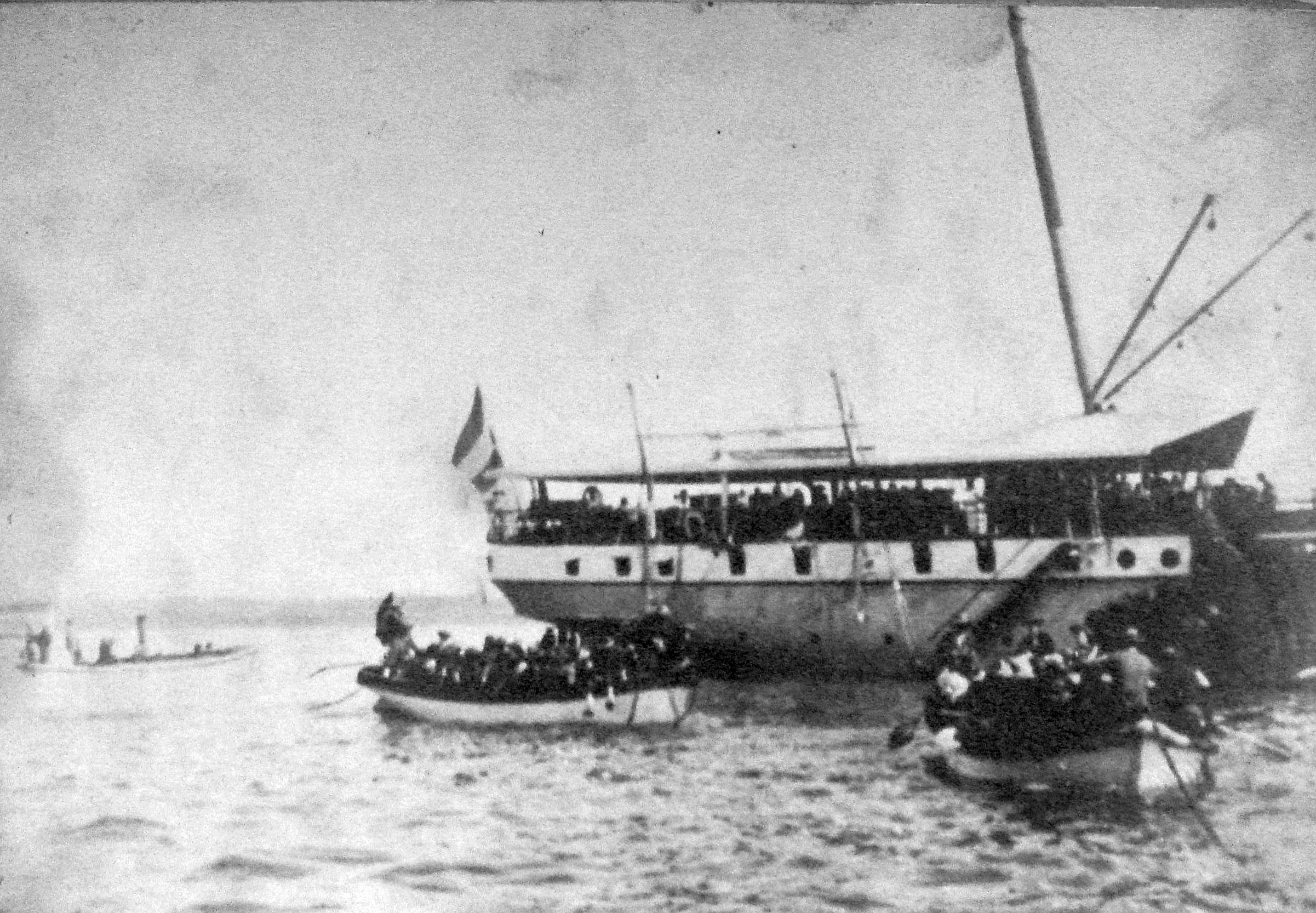
Dutch troops landing at Sanur during the Dutch intervention in Bali (1906).

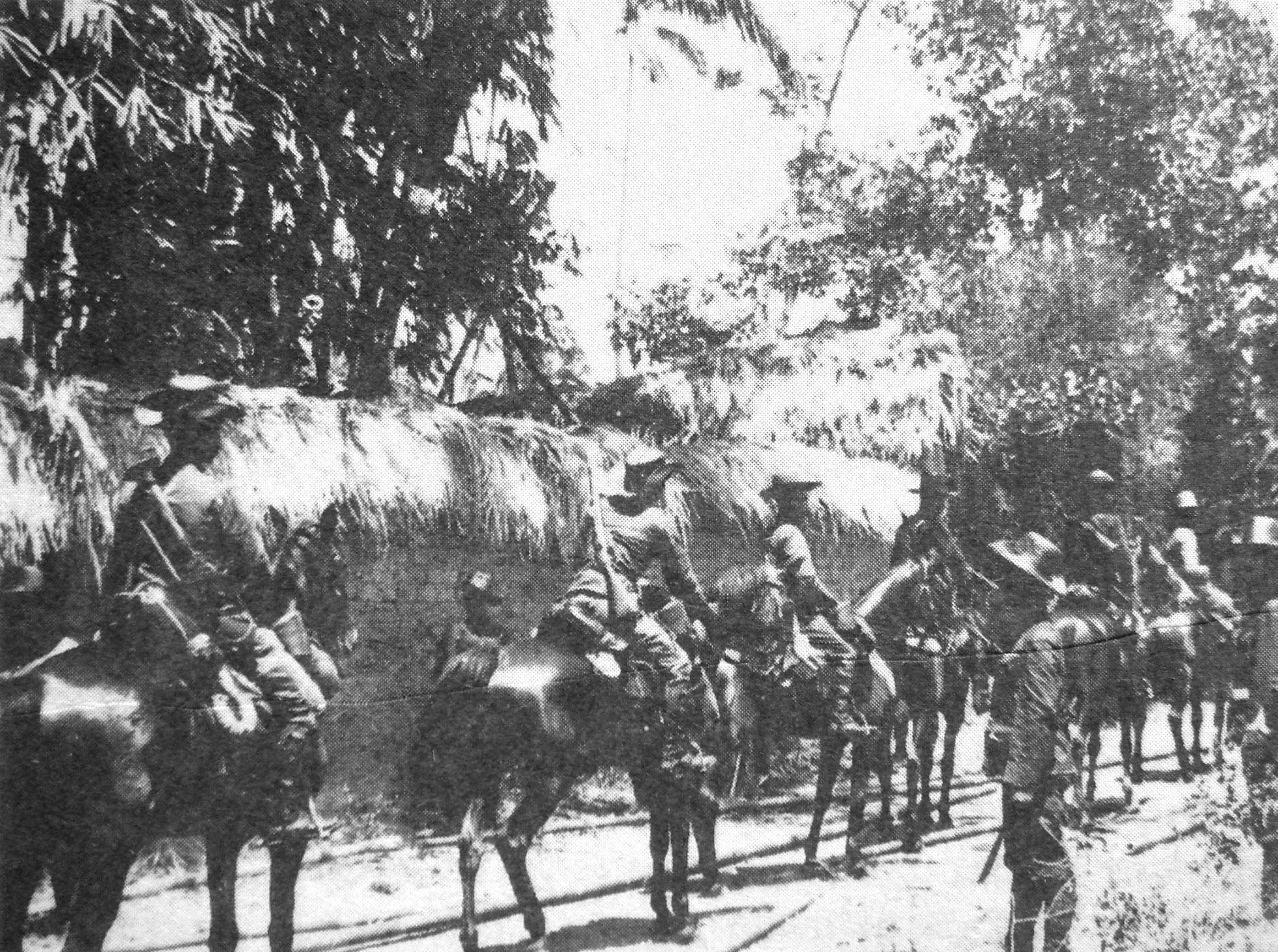
Dutch cavalry at Sanur in 1906.

The beginning of mass tourism and Bali's largest hotel

As the coastal area closest to the capital Denpasar, Sanur predates Kuta, Nusa Dua, and Uluwatu as the oldest destination for beach tourism in Bali. Until 1966 only three significant hotels operated on the island. (Note: Vickers lists the first three hotels as the Sindhu Beach Hotel at Sanur, the Kuta Beach Hotel at Kuta, and the Bali Hotel in Denpasar, all state-owned hotels run by the government's national tourist agency.) In 1963 under Indonesian President Sukarno construction started in Sanur on the then Bali Beach InterContinental Hotel, financed with money from the Japanese War Reparations funds. Inaugurated in 1966, this was the first five-star luxury resort in Bali, also the first to have been built to international standards and managed internationally. It was ten stories high, had 566 rooms. and marked the beginning of mass tourism in Bali — with mixed feelings from local leaders and communities. Eventually, it brought the Bali Governor to issue in 1971 a new legislation forbidding all future hotel development higher than 15 m, which is more or less the height of a mature coconut tree. As of 2024 this legislation is still in place and this hotel remains to this day the highest hotel in Bali. The hotel is set on 42 hectares, which allowed for a golf course.
In 1979 the Bali Beach InterContinental hotel was renamed Bali Beach hotel, managed by PT Hotel Indonesia International. (Note: Another source mentions that the hotel was renamed Hotel Grand Bali Beach when the InterContinental Hotel management contract ended.)
On 20 January 1993, a fire that lasted 3 days caused the hotel to be shut; it was rebuilt and reopened on October 4, 1993 with a new name: the Grand Bali Beach. After a merger of PT Hotel Indonesia International with PT Natour, it was again renamed as InnaGrand Bali Beach hotel — later changed to Grand Inna Bali Beach Hotel. Another major fire on 1 March 2020 damaged its roof and upper floors; while a second fire started simultaneously in the hotel's laundry at the lower level. On August 11, 2021, yet another fire triggered by a portable air conditioner destroyed the staff cafeteria.

=== 21st century ===
By then, the establishment of a Special Economic Zone (KEK) was already in the air — and the Grand Inna Bali Beach a major pawn on that gameboard: it owned a very large piece of land, and is one of Bali's oldest and most famous hotels, well set for becoming the first Heritage hotel in Indonesia
In May 2022, the Tower and the Garden were closed for renovations and the whole hotel shut that year in July. It reopened during the early mouths of 2024, under yet another name: the Meru Sanur.

2020's, the Special Economic Zone Development

A long-standing proposal for establishing a Special Economic Zone (KEK) Development of Sanur was making its way through the 2010s and eventually obtained the agreement of the National KEK Council chaired by Airlangga Hartanto, Coordinating Minister for the Economy, on July 22, 2022. It has been officially established by the Government Regulation No. 41 on November 1, 2022. Created to attract foreign direct investment, promote trade, and stimulate economic growth and development, special economic zones (SEZ) have more favorable economic regulations than other regions in the same country.

The one in Sanur is on 41.26 hectares. Among other buildings, it includes the Sanur International Hospital (built in collaboration with the USA Mayo Clinic), it was completed by the end of 2023 and operational by early 2024; the Ethnomedicinal Botanical Garden, with more than 500 species of plants on 6.5 hectares; a commercial center with a cultural space; and a number of hotels, including the Bali Beach hotel beside the Bung Karno / Meru Convention center.

The development of this Sanur Special Economic Zone is happening in coordination with the development of Benoa Harbor as the Bali Marine Tourism Hub (BMTH); all of which aims at increasing foreign tourism expenditures in Bali while targeting middle and upper-class travelers.

== Tourism ==
Largest hotel in Bali, the newly reopened Grand Inna Bali Beach / Meru Sanur hotel has now 523 rooms and suites, plus its villas and cottages on the south side, all newly equipped, as well as a spa, a fitness center, a swimming pool, a restaurant, a bar, and a lounge. In the course of its latest refurbishing, a large swath of the hotel's land has been dedicated to the construction of an international hospital complex on the inland side of the hotel, and of a large convention center on its north side. The 3,750 square meters convention space, or "MICE Facilities" (MICE standing for "meeting, incentive, conference, and exhibition"), can accommodate up to 4,000 persons and is to be used for meetings, weddings, exhibitions and concerts.

Sanur also includes other hotel resorts such as Maya Sanur Resort & Spa, the InterContinental Bali Sanur Resort (rebranded from Fairmont Sanur Beach Bali in 2022, which itself was rebranded from Regent Bali in 2014), the Hyatt Regency Bali (formerly Bali Hyatt, not to be confused with the Grand Hyatt in Nusa Dua), and Andaz Bali. Sanur is also home to a growing number of popular villa resorts.

Also catering to the tourists are many restaurants and shops spread around the coastal area. Many of these are Bali-grown brands that favor ingredients or materials original to the island. Among those, The Sandwich Bar, Flamingo Beach Club in Pantai Saba, or Italian Gelateria and restaurant Massimo is a long-standing institution, with queues to be seen on almost every night. Another Italian style in Sanur is resort wear boutique BIASA, a fashion pioneer on the island founded by art enthusiast Susanna Perini.

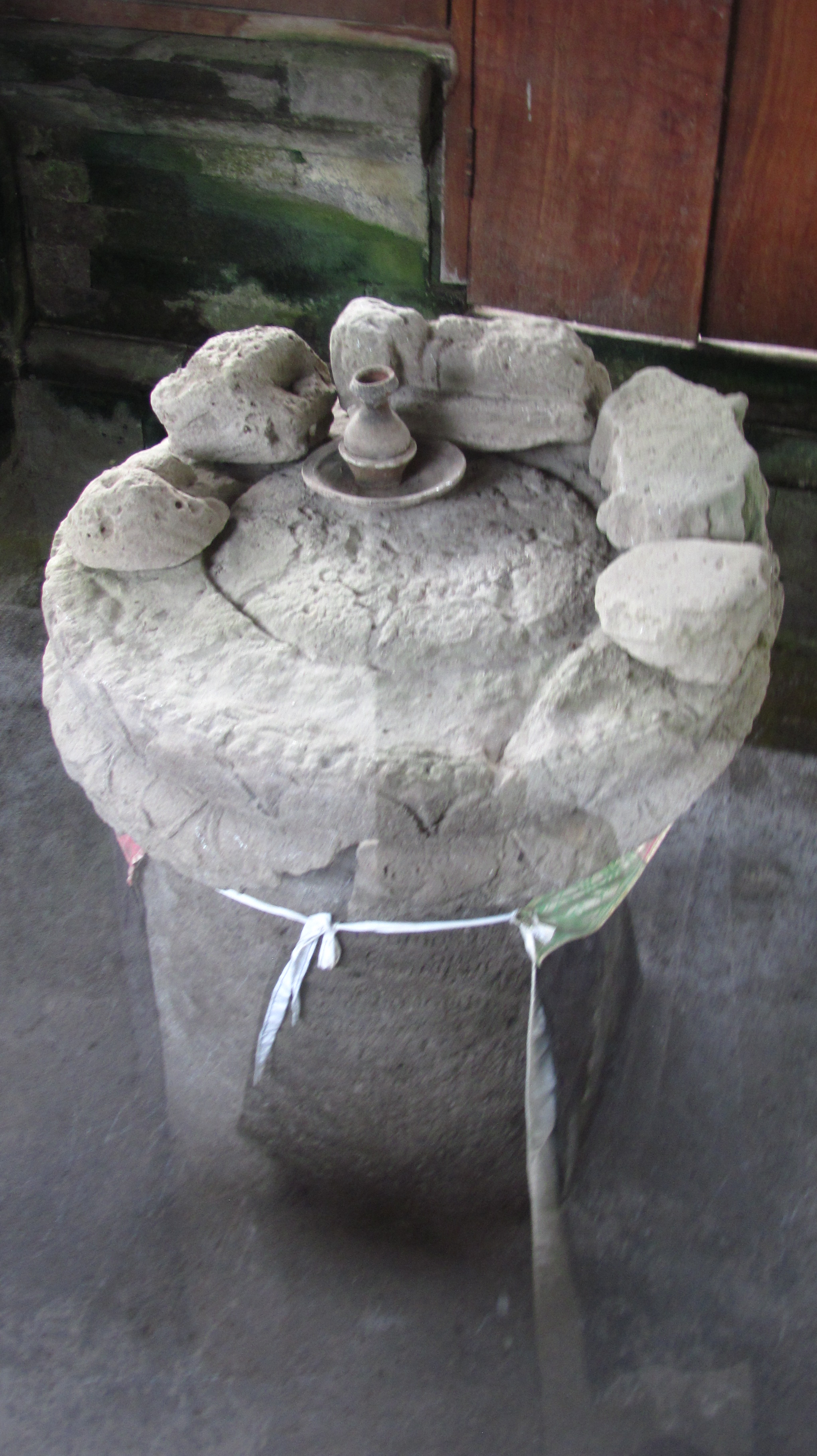
Stone column Belanjong pillar beside Pura Belangjong.

== Sights ==
Traditional fishing boats can be seen on the beach of Sanur, offering a scenic view of the island Nusa Penida.

Adrien-Jean Le Mayeur de Merprès (1880–1958), a Belgian painter, lived in Sanur from 1932 to 1958. His house was transformed into a museum, Museum Le Mayeur, where about 80 of his most important paintings are exhibited. Bali Orchid Garden, a park about 3 km north of Sanur, is worth a visit as well.

Another interesting sight can be visited south of Sanur in Jalan Danau Poso Street beside Pura Blanjong, a small Hindu temple. A stone column, the Belanjong pillar measuring 1.77 metres, can be seen under a roof at the end of a short and narrow blind alley. This is the oldest known human-made object in Bali. The column bears inscriptions dating from the 9th century written in Sanskrit and a very old form of Balinese. Various objects made of stone possibly dating from the same period are exhibited as well.

== Education ==
The Bali International School is located in Sanur.

The Sanur Independence School is also located in Sanur.

Rumah Kecil is a playgroup for children between 1–6 years old.

== Transportation ==
Sanur does have a comprehensive public transportation system - it is part of the extensive route offered by government-owned Trans Metro Dewata. However, despite serving as a form of public transport, it only covers a tiny percentage of the area and the locals mostly relies on motorbike for their own transportation.

Many tourists opt to hire private drivers or join organized tours to explore Sanur and other parts of Bali. This option offers convenience and allows them to customize their itineraries according to their interests.

Many local and international travellers rely on modern ride-hailing apps such as Grab and GoJek to get around easily by car or motorbike.

Get Bali Driver is located in Sanur.

== Gallery ==
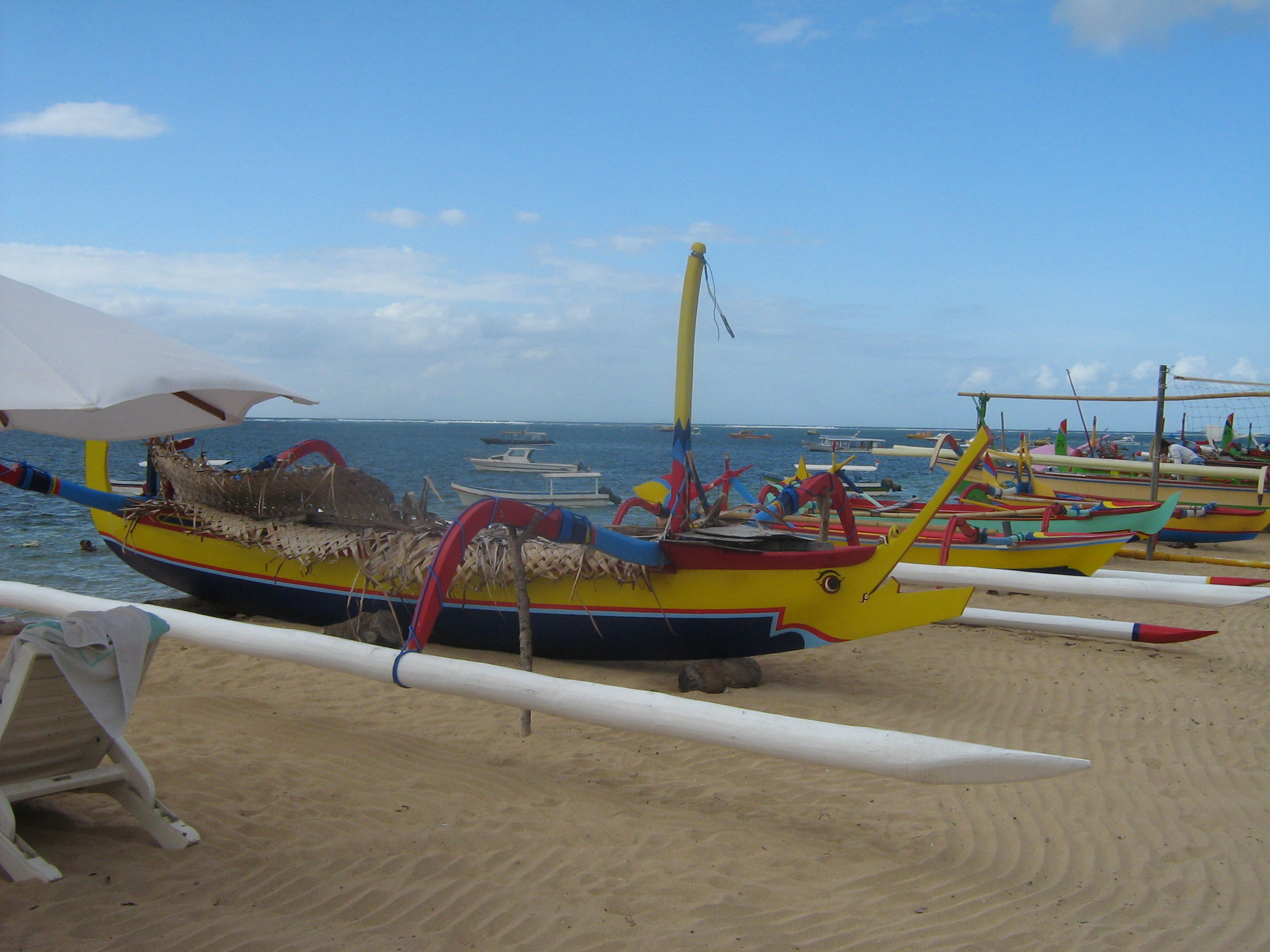
Traditional fishing boats on Sanur beach

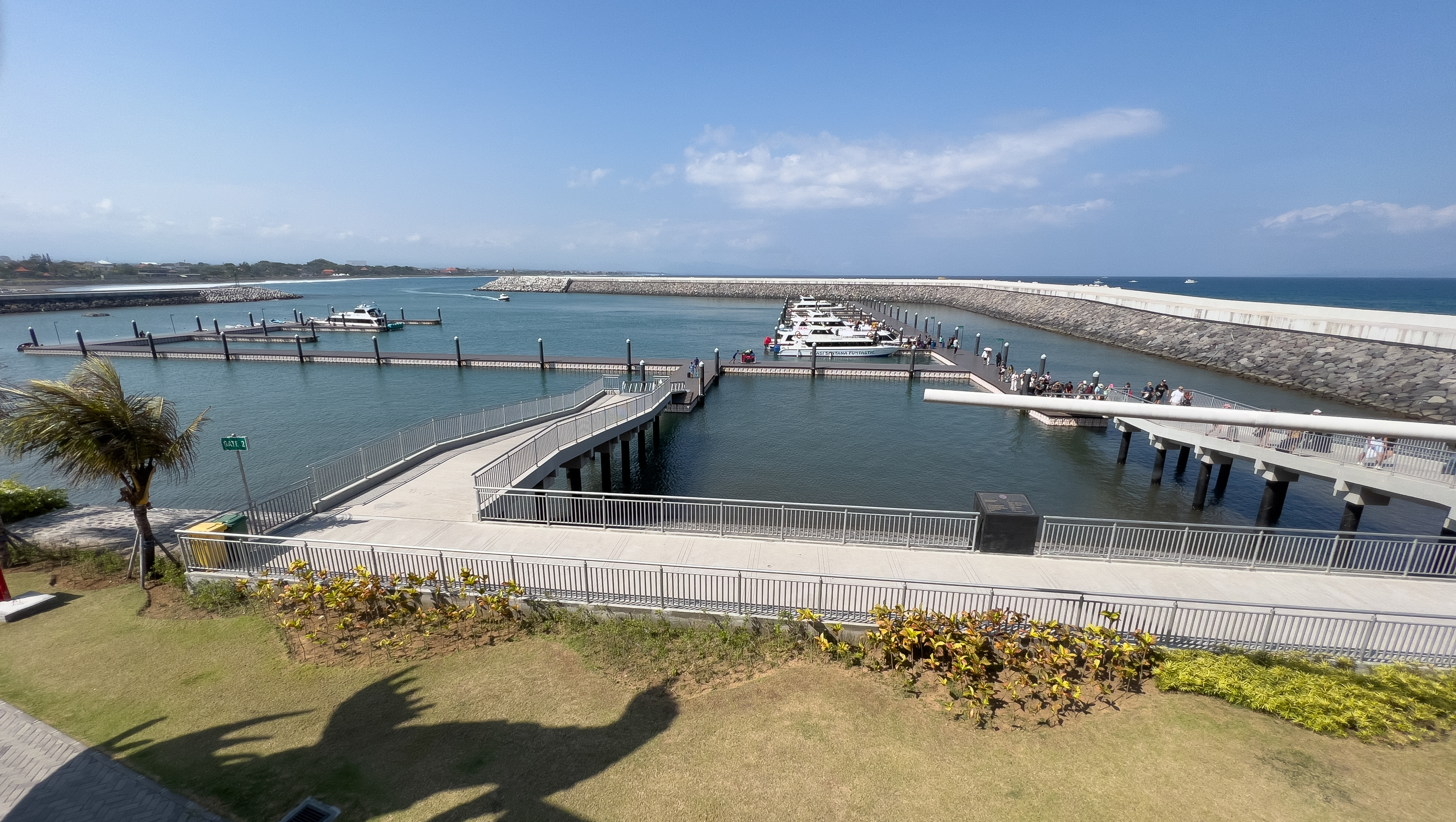
Sanur Port

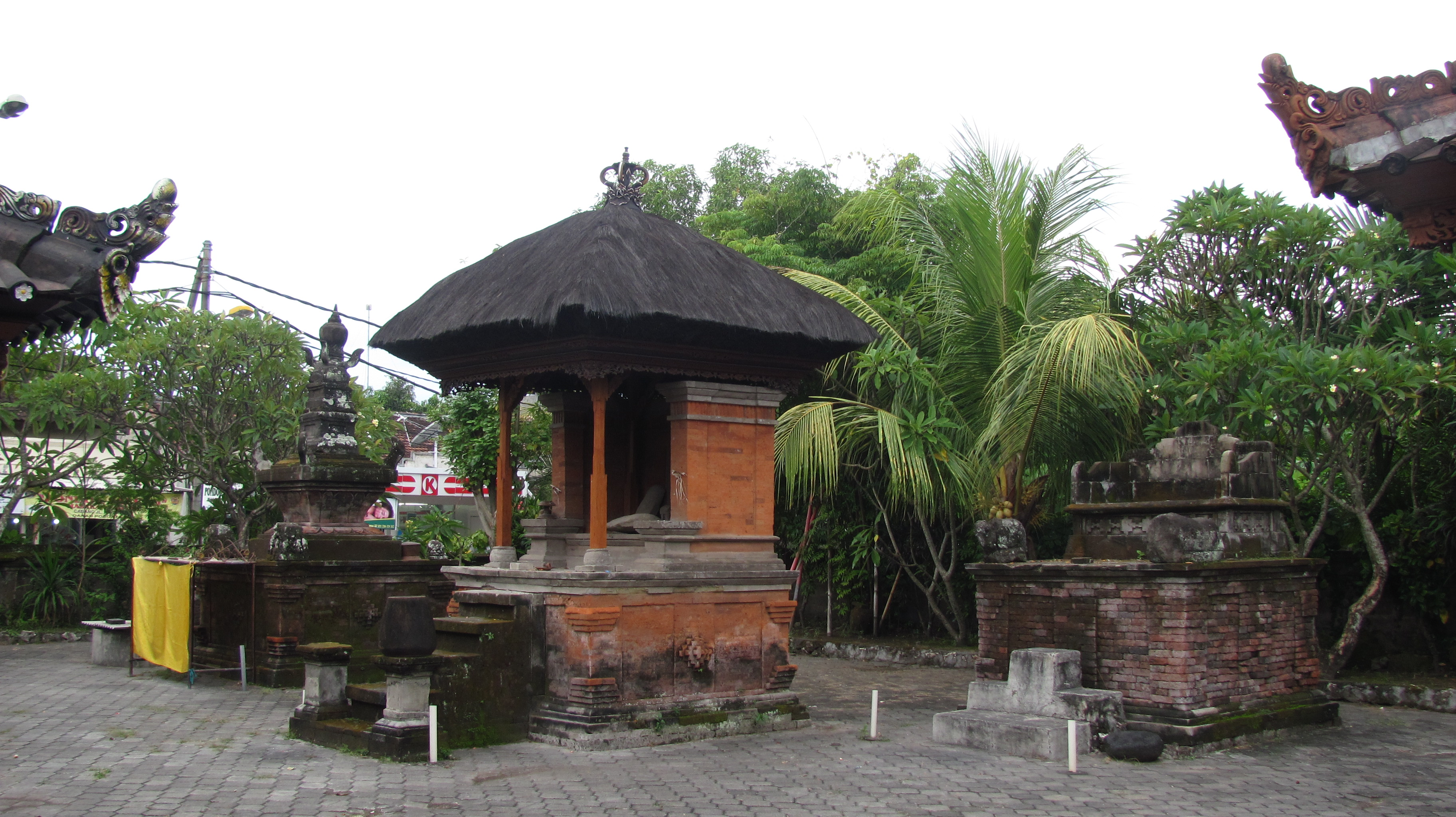
Hindu temple Pura Belangjong
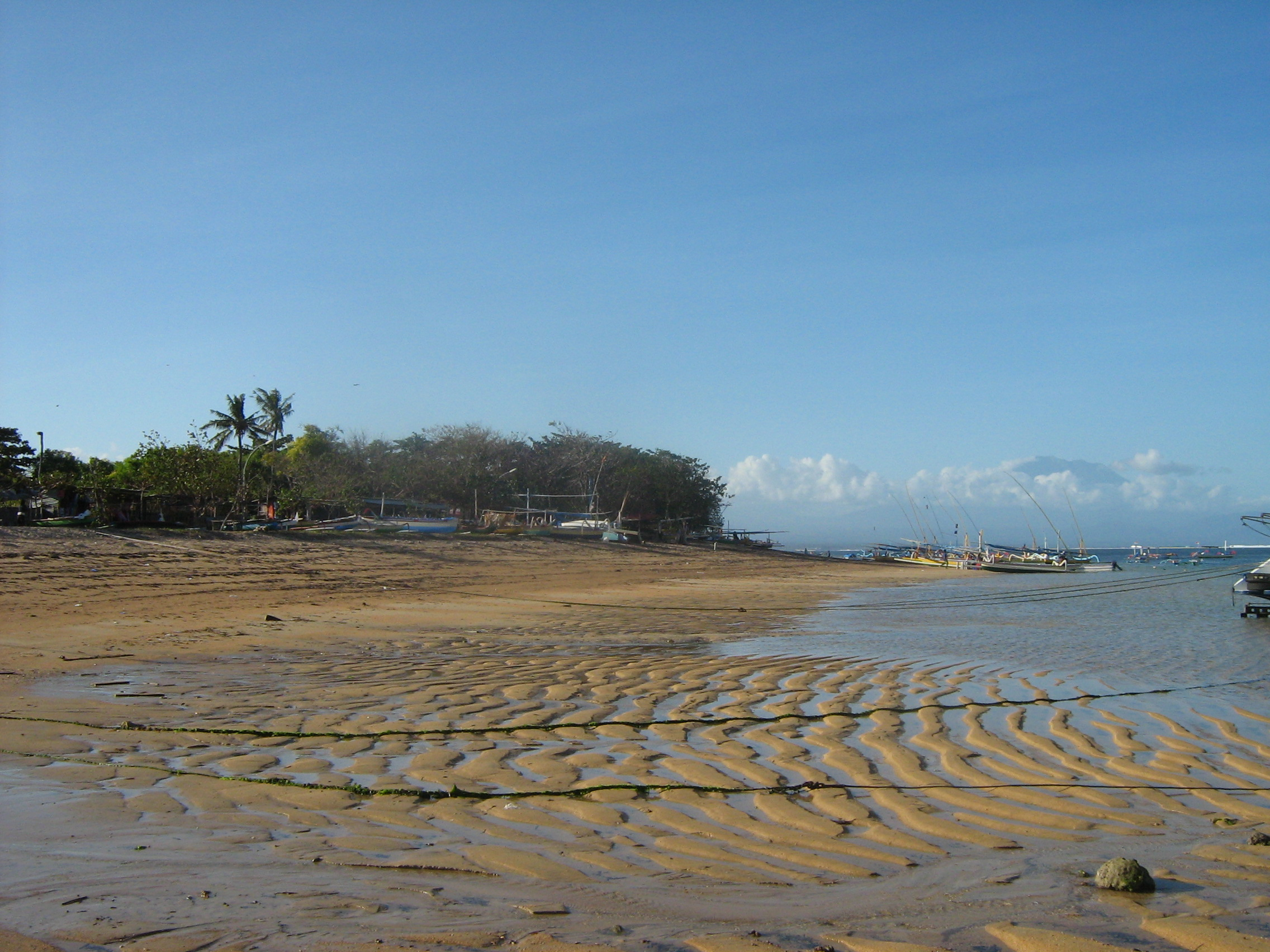
Sanur Beach

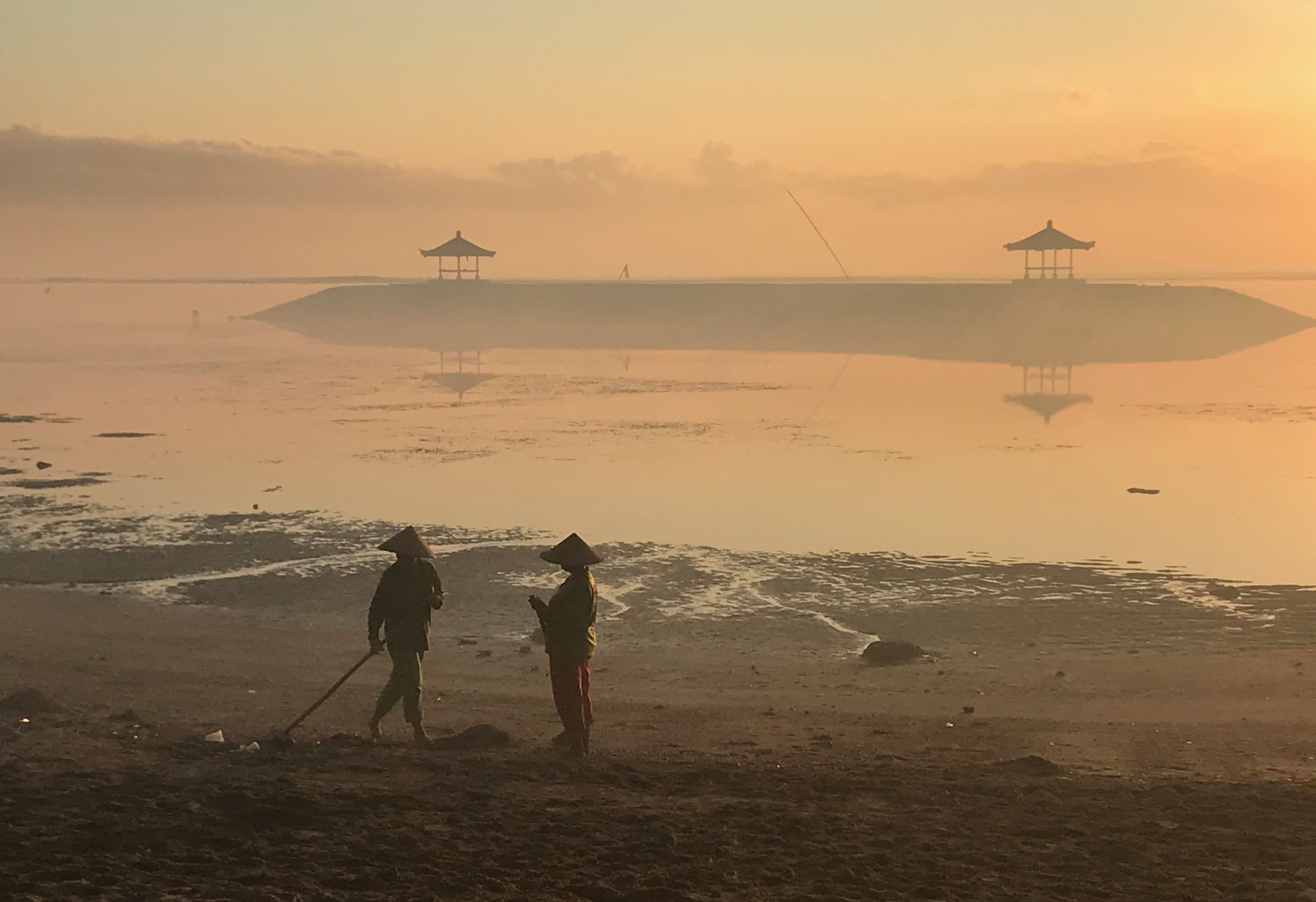
Sanur Beach at dawn

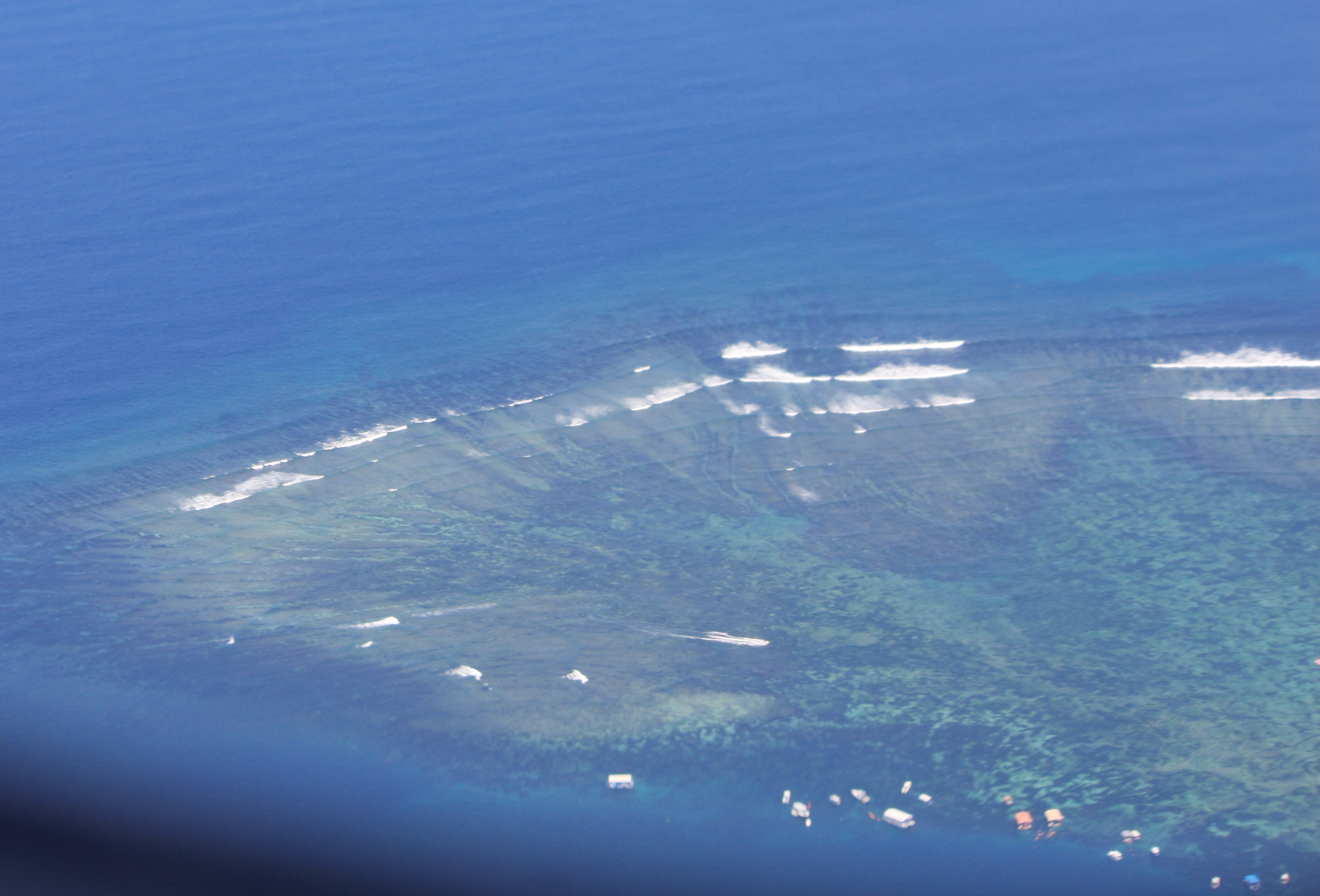
Sanur reef seen from above

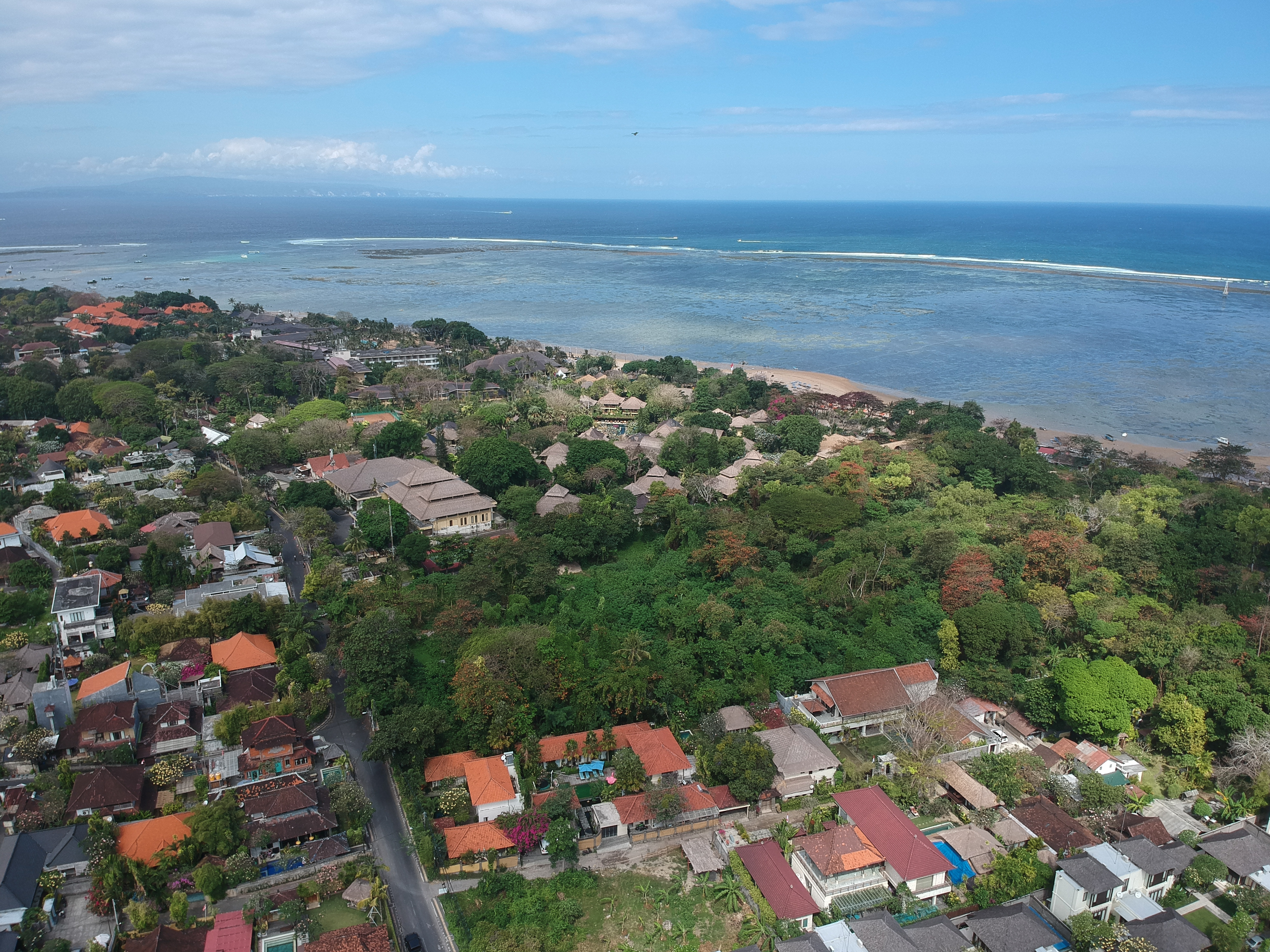
Sanur from above, Nusa Penida on the horizon

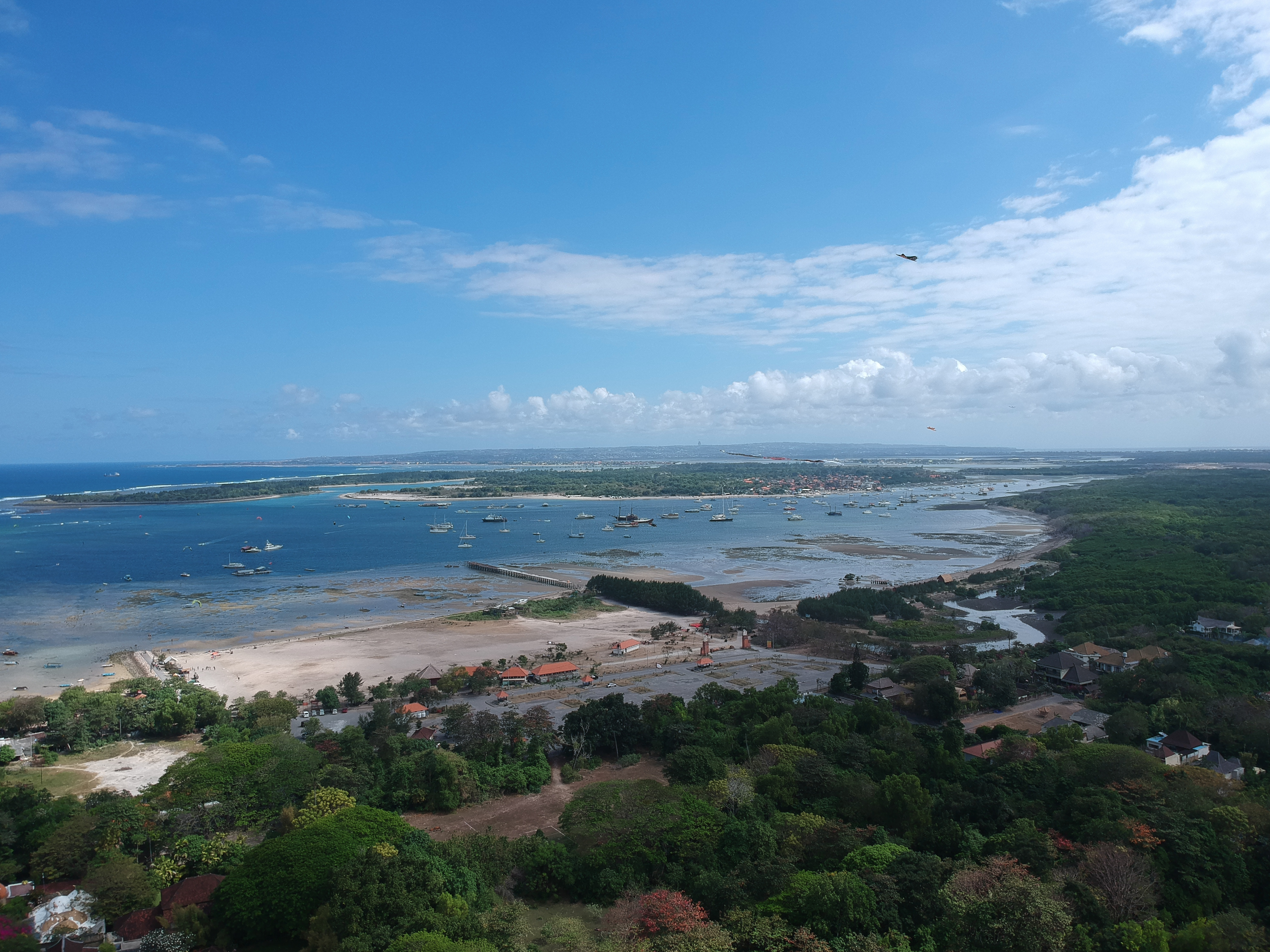
Mertasari beach, Serangan island in mid-plan

== See also ==
- Ayung River
