= Taw Sein Ko =

Sino-Burmese archaeologist

Sir Taw Sein Ko
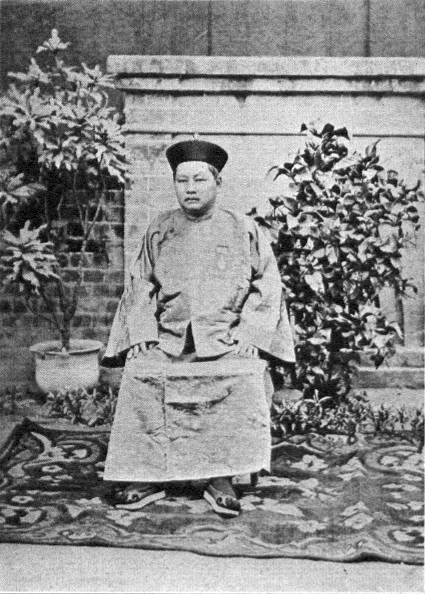
- Born: 7 December 1864; Monday, 6th waning of Nadaw 1226 ME; Moulmein, British Burma
- Died: 29 May 1930 (aged 65); Wednesday, 1st waning of Nayon 1292 ME; Mandalay, British Burma
- Education: Rangoon College; Inner Temple, Inns of Court
- Occupation: Archaeologist
- Children: 6 sons, 1 daughter
- Parent(s): Taw Sein Sun (father); Daw Nu

Taw Sein Ko CIE ISO (Burmese: တော်စိန်ခို; Chinese: 杜成誥; pinyin: Dù Chénggào; Pe̍h-ōe-jī: Tō͘ Sêng-kò; 7 December 1864 – 29 May 1930) was Burma's first recorded archaeologist. He spent over 32 years in various government services, and ended his career in 1919 as the Superintendent of the Archaeological Survey of Burma.

== Personal life ==
He was born in Moulmein (present-day Mawlamyine, Mon State) in 1864. He was the son of a Burmese Chinese father with ancestry from Amoy, China, Taw Sein Sun (杜成孫) who worked in shipping operations along the Burmese coast in the 1840s. His mother Daw Nu (ဒေါ်နု) was probably a Mon lady. Later, their family went north. Taw's father became a well-known merchant in Bhamo. Taw married to the daughter of Tan Htun (who died in October 1910), a merchant in Rangoon.

Taw studied in "Mandalay's Dr. Marks School" together with the princes of the Royal House of Konbaung, including Prince Thibaw in 1871. Taw graduated from Rangoon College in 1881 and read law at the Inner Temple, Inns of Court in 1892. He also attended Christ’s College, Cambridge.

== Career ==
Taw Sein Ko joined the Indian Civil Service in 1884. In 1886, he wrote Maung Po: A Product of Western Civilization. Taw became an assistant to Emanuel Forchhammer, the chief archeologist. In 1899, nine years after Forchhammer's death, Taw Sein Ko and Tun Nyein published an English language compilation of all the stone inscriptions collected by Forchhammer in the areas around Pagan, Pinya and Ava.

Throughout the 1880s to 1910s, Taw was a prominent advocate of university education and education of women in Burma and lobbied for prioritising Buddhist education in the British-led state curriculum. He was an advocate for modernising Burma's medical education system, and unsuccessfully lobbied for incorporating indigenous treatments and practices into school curriculum. He was also instrumental in re-instituting nationwide Buddhist scripture examinations in Pali for Buddhist monks in 1895 and the appointment and election of a Buddhist Supreme Patriarch in 1903.

In 1893, he became the Assistant Secretary to the Government of Burma. That year, after completing his first archaeological tour of Mon areas, he published his findings where he advocated for the preservation of the Mon language through conservation of manuscripts and relics at various museums in Burma (Bernard Free Library and Phayre Museum) and England.

In 1897, he was sent as part of a government delegation to Peking (now Beijing) and appointed Government Burmese Translator, concurrently with the positions of Archaeologist and Adviser on Chinese Affairs for two years. During the 1899–1900 Boxer uprising, he served as a Warden of the Frontier Areas, and helped to establish an Anglo-Chinese School. In 1902, he returned to his position as Assistant Secretary. From 1903–1905, he served his terms as Government Archaeologist and Adviser on Chinese Affairs. In 1906, the government re-designated the position of Government Archaeologist as Superintendent of the Archaeological Survey.

In all, Taw spent over 32 years in various government services. He became the Assistant Superintendent of the Archaeological Survey of Burma in August 1914, and in 1917 became the Superintendent. He retired on 7 December 1919, and was succeeded by Charles Duroiselle.

In 1903, Taw was awarded the Gold Kaisar-i-Hind Medal from Delhi Durbar. On 12 December 1911, King George V bestowed upon him the Imperial Service Order. In 1917, he was appointed by King George V (1865–1936) to the Most Eminent Order of the Indian Empire.

He died at the age of 66 years in Mandalay and left behind six sons and one daughter.

== Legacy ==
Taw was the founder of Bagan Archeological Museum, Myanmar. In 1902, he founded a small museum near Ananda Temple in Bagan, which became present-day Bagan Archeological Museum.

== Bibliography ==
- Duroiselle, Charles (1920). Report of the Superintendent, Archaeological Survey of Burma for the Year Ending 31st March 1920. Rangoon: Office of the Superintendent, Government Printing, Burma.
- Taw, Sein Ko; Emanuel Forchhammer; Tun Nyein (1899). Inscriptions of Pagan, Pinya and Ava: Translation, with Notes. Rangoon: Archaeological Survey of India.
