= Aung Thaw =

Burmese archaeologist

- Born: 1920; Burma (now Myanmar)
- Known for: Excavations at Beikthano; research on Pyu cities; studies of Padah-Lin Caves

Academic work
- Discipline: Archaeology
- Institutions: Archaeological Survey of Burma
- Notable works: Report on the Excavations at Beikthano (1968); Historical Sites in Burma (1972)

Aung Thaw (Burmese: အောင်သော် [ʔàʊɰ̃ θɔ̀]; born 1920) is a Burmese archaeologist and emeritus Director-General of the Archaeological Survey of Burma.

Between 1959 and 1968, he excavated and studied intensely the historical site of Beikthano (Peikthanomyo). He published many works which are today seen as authoritative papers on this site, including a Preliminary report on the excavation at Peikthanomyo and his conclusive findings in 1968. Aung Thaw was involved in, and published the results of, the 1969-1971 excavations of the Padah-Lin Caves.

In 1972, he published a book on Historical sites in Burma and in 1993 co-authored a book on Ancient Myanmar Cities with Than Shwe, Sein Maung Oo, and Myint Aung.
