= Writing systems of Southeast Asia =

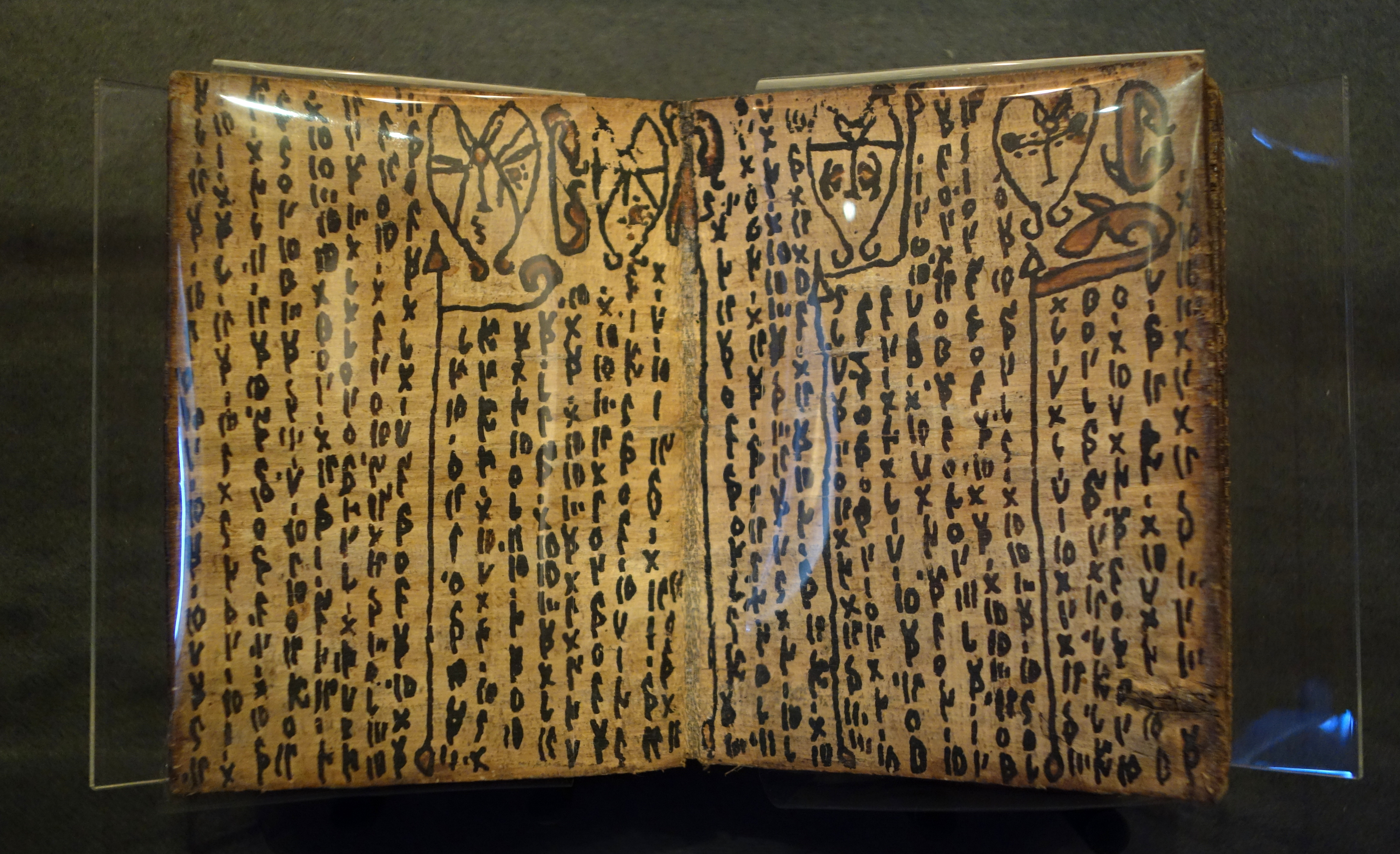
A manuscript from the early 1800s from central Sumatra, in Batak Toba language, one of many languages from Indonesia.

Southeast Asia uses various non-Latin-based writing systems. The writing systems below are listed by language family.

== Austroasiatic languages ==
- Khmer script (for Khmer language)
- Khom script (for Bahnaric languages)
- Chữ Nôm (historical writing for Vietnamese language)

== Austronesian languages ==
Most Austronesian languages use Latin script today. Some non-Latin-based writing systems are listed below.

- Jawi and Pegon scripts (for Malay and a number of other languages, as well as Papuan Ternate and Tidore)
- Cham script (for Cham language)
- Eskayan script (for Eskayan language)
- Gangga Melayu
- Kawi script (used across Maritime Southeast Asia)
  - Batak script
  - Baybayin
    - Buhid script
    - Hanunó'o script
    - Kulitan alphabet (for Kapampangan language)
    - Tagbanwa script
  - Buda script
    - Balinese script
    - Javanese script
    - Old Sundanese script
      - Sundanese script
  - Lontara script
    - Lota Ende script
    - Mbojo script
    - Sikka script
  - Makasar script
  - Rencong/Ulu script
    - Kerinci script
    - Lampung script
    - Rejang script
    - Serang script
  - Sasak script
- Other scripts
  - Alifuru script
  - Bonda script
  - Dunging script
  - Gayo script
  - Malesung script
  - Minangkabau script
  - Mongondow script
  - Nias script
  - Sangir script

== Hmong-Mien languages ==
- Romanized Popular Alphabet (Hmong RPA)
- Pollard script
- Pahawh Hmong
- Nyiakeng Puachue Hmong
- Eebee Hmong

== Kra-Dai languages ==
Many Southwestern Tai languages are written using Brāhmī-derived alphabets. Zhuang languages were traditionally written with Chinese characters, but are now usually written with romanized alphabets.

- Thai script
- Lao script
- Sawndip
- Shan script
- Tai Viet script
- Tai Le script
- New Tai Lue alphabet
- Tai Tham script
- Tai Yo script

== Tibeto-Burman languages ==
- Burmese alphabet
  - S'gaw Karen alphabet
  - Chakma script
- Ersu Shaba
- Kayah Li alphabet
- Fraser alphabet (used to write the Lisu language)
- Naxi script
  - Geba syllabary
  - Dongba symbols
- Zomi script
- Tangut script
- Tibetan script
- Tujia script
- Yi script

== See also ==
- Classification schemes for Southeast Asian languages
- Writing systems of Africa
