= Jawoe script =

Variant of the Jawi Arabic script used for the Acehnese language

Jawoe Acèh جاوي اچيه
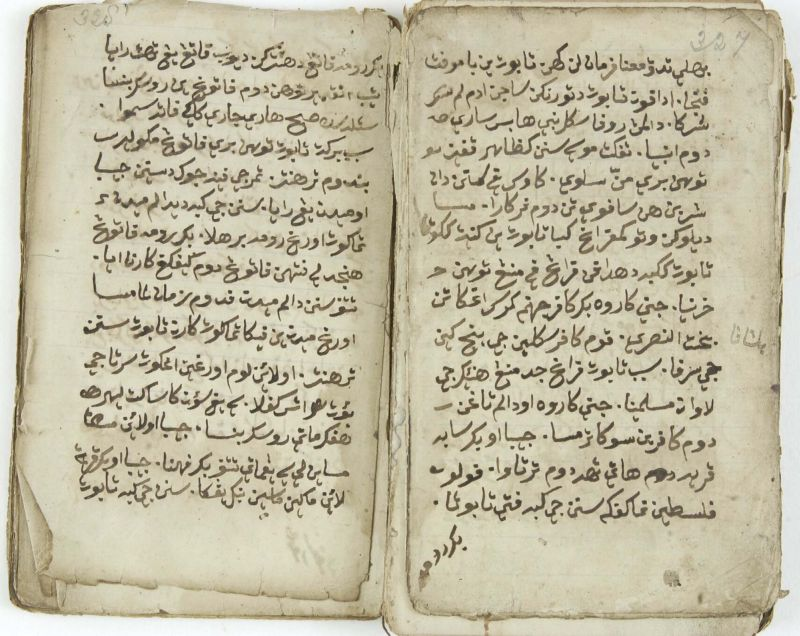
- A manuscript in Jawoe
- Script type: Abjad
- Period: c. 1600 CE to the present (limited use)
- Direction: Right-to-left
- Languages: Acehnese

Related scripts
- Parent systems: Proto-Sinaitic: Phoenician; Aramaic; Nabataean; Arabic; Jawi; Jawoe Acèh
- Sister systems: Pegon script, Cham Jawi

Part of a series on

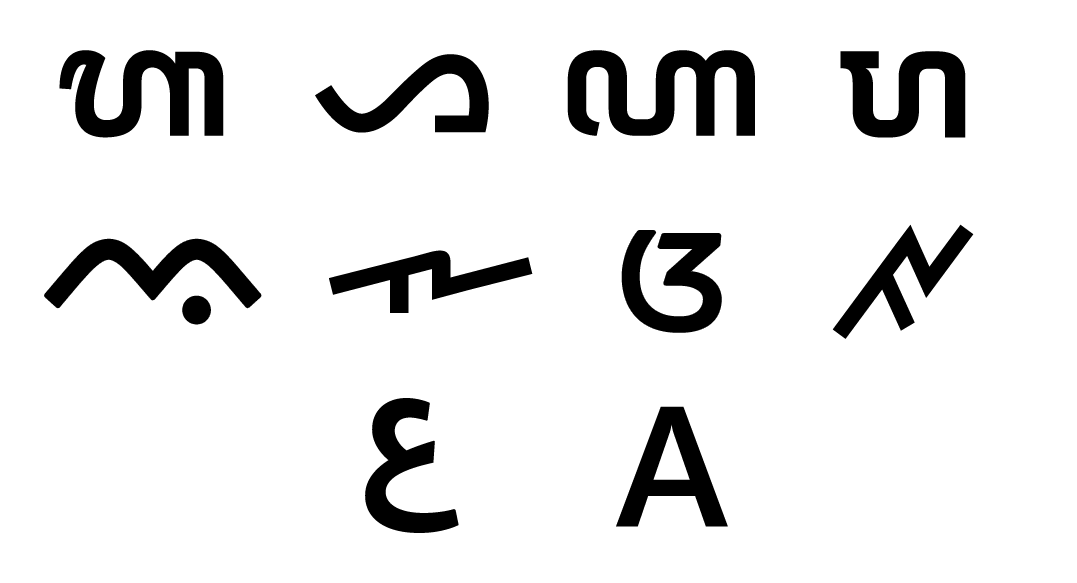

Writing systems used in Indonesia
Abugida (Brahmic)
- Balinese
- Batak
- Buda
- Javanese
- Kawi
- Lontara (Satera Jontal, Mbojo)
- Makasar
- Sasak
- Sundanese (Old Sundanese)
- Ulu (Incung, Komering, Lampung, Lembak,
- Ogan, Pasemah, Rejang, Serawai)
Abjad
- Buri Wolio
- Jawi
- Jawoe
- Pegon
Alphabet
- Latin (Van Ophuijsen, Suwandi, EYD)
Others
- Alifuru
- Bonda
- Cia-Cia
- Bilang-bilang
- Dunging
Related
- List of writing systems of Indonesia
- Languages of Indonesia

Jawoe or Acehnese Jawi (Jawoe Acèh; جاوي اچيه, Acehnese pronunciation: [ɟaˈwɔ(ə̯) aˈceh]; Husaini: Djawoë Atjèh), known natively as harah Jawoe (حرف جاوي, 'Jawoe letters'), is a right-to-left abjad used for writing Acehnese, dating from the 17th century. It is a variant of the Jawi script, which itself is derived from the Arabic alphabet.

== History ==
The term Jawoe in Acehnese refers to the Malay language written in the Jawi script, though nowadays, Jawoe largely refers to the adapted Arabic alphabet used for writing Acehnese, and is often interchangeable with Jawi, sometimes specified as Acehnese Jawi.

The Jawoe script is an adapted form of Jawi, which was the lingua franca of the region and the main language used in Acehnese courts, by Acehnese scholars to write Acehnese, though most writing in Aceh was still written in Jawi Malay, which still requires them to be fluent in Malay to be literate.

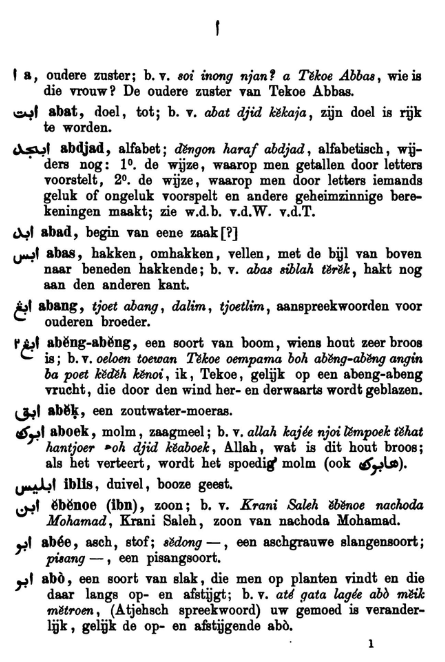
The first page of "Woordenboek der Atjehsche taal" (A Wordbook of the Acehnese Language), the only known Acehnese dictionary that uses Jawoe.

The earliest known manuscript written in Jawoe is Hikayat Sama'un (The Story of Syama'un) from 1658 CE. Aside from native writings, many Dutch papers have also documented the usage of Jawoe. A Dutch-Acehnese dictionary by Karel Frederik Hendrik van Langen in 1889 remains to this day the only dictionary that uses Jawoe.

After Dutch colonisation and the independence of Indonesia, the Latin alphabet became more popular for Acehnese, and Jawoe has largely fallen out of use. Though, as recently as 2015, there has been growing interest regarding Jawoe reading amongst the Acehnese populace.

== Reading ==
Due to Jawi's influence in Acehnese literature, Jawoe is largely unchanged from Jawi aside from new words for writing native Acehnese words and loanwords, which causes Jawoe to be akin to a heterogramic writing system, where words are spelt in Malay and Arabic but read in Acehnese. For example, the Acehnese words teukeudi (lit. 'fate') and ujoe (lit. 'to test') are spelt as تقدير (tqdyr) and اوجي (ʔwjy) respectively. Snouck Hurgronje describes it as such:

This character is inadequate for representing the consonants and wholly incapable of representing the vowels of the Acehnese. Thus it comes about that the Acehnese adhere to the spelling which represented their language in a bygone age when many sounds now lost or modified occurred; thus they write r at the end of syllables but do not sound it; they write l at the end of syllables but sound it as y or ë; s is changed in the same position to h or ih. (Note: The ih sound only applies to the Pidie dialect of Acehnese.) For all these reasons one can hardly read Acehnese written by Acehnese without having previously mastered the colloquial.

— Christiaan Snouck Hurgronje, The Achehnese, xix

=== Letters ===
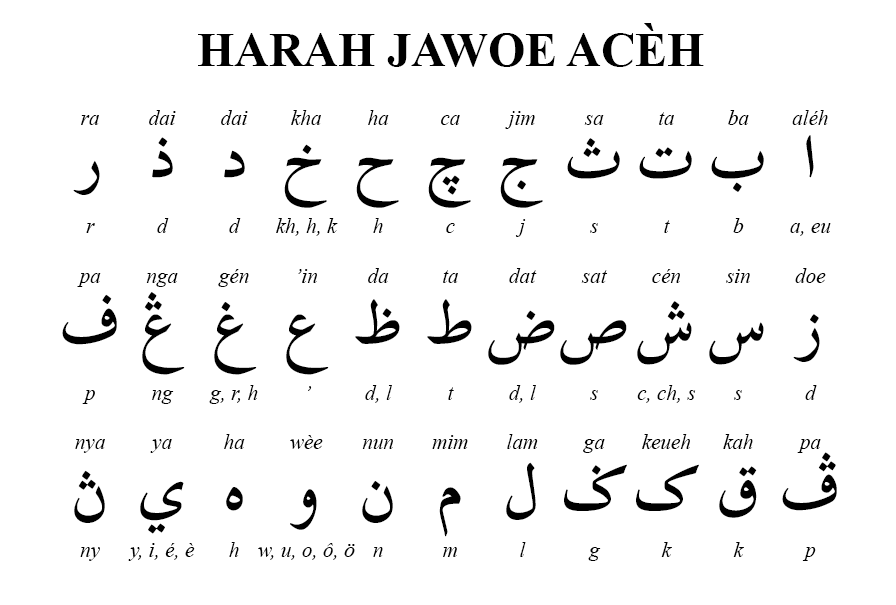
The Jawoe alphabet.

Jawoe has thirty three letters, with the major difference between Jawi is the merging of alif maqsurah (ى) with ya (ي), the usage of 'ayn (ع) to represent vowel nasality, and the usage of hamza (ء) above alif (ا), waw (و), or ya (ي) to signify a glottal stop before the vowel, though most of the letters and their individual pronunciations within a word are often than not inconsistent due to the fact that most of the Acehnese words are written with their Jawi Malay cognates.

The table below lists all the letters used in Jawoe and its main sounds, with its modern Latin equivalents, both in EBAYD and Husaini:

| Name | Isolated | Initial | Medial | Final | IPA | Latin | |
| Name | Isolated | Initial | Medial | Final | IPA | EBAYD | Husaini |
|---|---|---|---|---|---|---|---|
| aléh | ا | | ـا | | /ʔ/ and /a, ə, ɯ/ | a, e, eu | a, e/ë, eu |
| ba | ب | بـ | ـبـ | ـب | /b/ | b | |
| ta | ت | تـ | ـتـ | ـت | /t/ | t | |
| sa | ث | ثـ | ـثـ | ـث | /s/ | s | |
| jim | ج | جـ | ـجـ | ـج | /ɟ/ | j | dj |
| ca | چ | چـ | ـچـ | ـچ | /c/ | c | tj |
| ha | ح | حـ | ـحـ | ـح | /h/ | h | |
| kha | خ | خـ | ـخـ | ـخ | /k, kʰ, h/ | k, kh, h | |
| dai | د | | ـد | | /d/ | d | |
| dai | ذ | | ـذ | | /d, l/ | d, l | |
| ra | ر | | ـر | | /r/ | r | |
| doe | ز | | ـز | | /d/ | d, j | d, dj |
| sin | س | سـ | ـسـ | ـس | /s/ | s | |
| cén | ش | شـ | ـشـ | ـش | /c, cʰ, s/ | c, ch, s | tj, tjh, s |
| sat | ص | صـ | ـصـ | ـص | /s/ | s | |
| dat, lat | ض | ضـ | ـضـ | ـض | /d, l/ | d, l | |
| ta | ط | طـ | ـطـ | ـط | /t/ | t | |
| da, la | ظ | ظـ | ـظـ | ـظ | /d, l/ | d, l | |
| ’in | ع | عـ | ـعـ | ـع | /◌̃/ | ’ | |
| gén, rén | غ | غـ | ـغـ | ـغ | /ɡ, r, h/ | g, r, h | |
| nga | ڠ | ڠـ | ـڠـ | ـڠ | /ŋ/ | ng | |
| pa | ف | فـ | ـفـ | ـف | /p/ | p | |
| pa | ڤ | ڤـ | ـڤـ | ـڤ | /p/ | p | |
| kah | ق | قـ | ـقـ | ـق | /k/ | k | |
| keueh | ک | کـ | ـکـ | ـک | /k/ | k | |
| ga | ݢ | ݢـ | ـݢـ | ـݢ | /ɡ/ | g | |
| lam | ل | لـ | ـلـ | ـل | /l/ | l | |
| mim | م | مـ | ـمـ | ـم | /m/ | m | |
| nun | ن | نـ | ـنـ | ـن | /n/ | n | |
| wèe | و | | ـو | | /w/ and /u, o, ɔ, ʌ/ | w, u, ô, o, ö | |
| ha | ه | هـ | ـهـ | ـه | /h/ | r | |
| ya | ي | ـي | ـيـ | يـ | /j/ and /i, e, ɛ/ | y, i, é, è | j, i, é, è |
| nya | ڽ | ڽـ | ـڽـ | ـڽ | /ɲ/ | ny | nj |

An additional letter, ta marbutah (ة) is also used, mostly in Arabic loans, but is not counted as a separate letter. The letter hamza (ء) is grouped with alif (ا).

Compared to Malay, Acehnese has a limited range of final consonant sounds, which collapses the range of consonants in the final position to voiceless stops (excluding palatal and velar, which merges with the coronal and glottal respectively), nasals (excluding the palatal), semivowels, and /h/. The table below represents each consonants and their respective final sounds, ordered alphabetically:

| Type | Bilabial | Coronal | Guttural |
|---|---|---|---|
| Nasal | [m] م | [n] ن | [ŋ] ڠ |
| Plosive | [p̚] ب، ف، ڤ | [t̠̚] ت، ج، چ، د، ط، ة | [ʔ] ع، ق، ک، ݢ، ء |
| Approximant | [w] و | [j] ض، ظ، ل، ي | [h] ث، ح، خ، ذ، ز، س، ش، ص، ف، ه، ة |

=== Vowels ===
Unlike Pegon and Buri Wolio, similar abjads derived from the Arabic alphabet from the region, Jawoe doesn't use vowel diacritics or harakah, which poses a difficulty in sufficiently representing Acehnese vowels. To represent long vowels, Arabic uses three letters: alif (ا), waw (و), and ya (ي), which limits Jawoe's options to represent Acehnese's 34 distinct vowel sounds.

| Vowels represented with a letter | | | | | | Vowels represented without a letter | | | | |
| IPA | Letter | Example with initial /b/ | | | | IPA | Example with initial /t̠/ | | | |
| IPA | Letter | Jawoe | EBAYD | IPA | English | IPA | Jawoe | EBAYD | IPA | English |
|---|---|---|---|---|---|---|---|---|---|---|
| /a/ | ا | بارت | barat | [baˈrat̠̚] | west | /a/ | تڤت | teupat | [t̠ɯˈpat̠̚] | correct |
| /ɯ/ | ا | بلابس | beuleubah | [bɯlɯˈbah] | lath | /ɯ/ | تنتڠ | teuntang | [t̠ɯnˈt̠aŋ] | facing |
| /u/ | و | بوتا | buta | [buˈt̠a] | blind | /u/ | تروکي | Turuki | [t̠uruˈki] | Turkey |
| /o/ | و | باتوک | batôk | [baˈt̠oʔ] | cough | /o/ | توجه | tujôh | [t̠uˈɟoh] | seven |
| /ɔ/ | و | بوه | boh | [bɔh] | fruit | /ɔ/ | توفڠ | tupong | [t̠uˈpɔŋ] | earlobe |
| /ʌ/ | و | بيو | beuö | [bɯˈʔʌ] | lazy | /ʌ/ | تڠه | teungöh | [t̠ɯˈŋʌh] | middle |
| /i/ | ي | بيبير | bibi | [biˈbi] | lips | /i/ | تجيق | tijik | [t̠iˈɟiʔ] | carry with one hand |
| /e/ | ي | بتيس | beutéh | [bɯˈt̠eh] | calf | /e/ | تربس | teureubéh | [t̠ɯrɯˈbeh] | steepness |
| /ɛ/ | ي | بريڠين | bringèn | [briˈŋɛn] | ficus tree | /ɛ/ | تريتف | teuritèb | [t̠ɯriˈt̠ɛp̚] | barnacle |
| | | | | | | /ə/ | تاهر | tahe | [t̠aˈhə] | pensive |

== Bibliography ==
- Daud, Bukhari (1997). Writing and reciting Acehnese: perspectives on language and literature in Aceh (PhD thesis). The University of Melbourne. hdl:11343/37197.
- Asyik, Abdul Gani (1987). A Contextual Grammar of Acehnese Sentences (PDF) (PhD thesis). The University of Michigan. Archived from the original on 2011-07-24.
- Muthalib, Kismullah Abdul (2017). Dialect features of Leupueng children: a study of dialect in post tsunami Aceh (PhD thesis). Syiah Kuala University.
- Hurgronje, C. Snouck (1892). Studiën over Atjèhsche klank- en schriftleer (in Dutch). (digital) Leiden University Libraries.
