= Ogan script =

Writing system

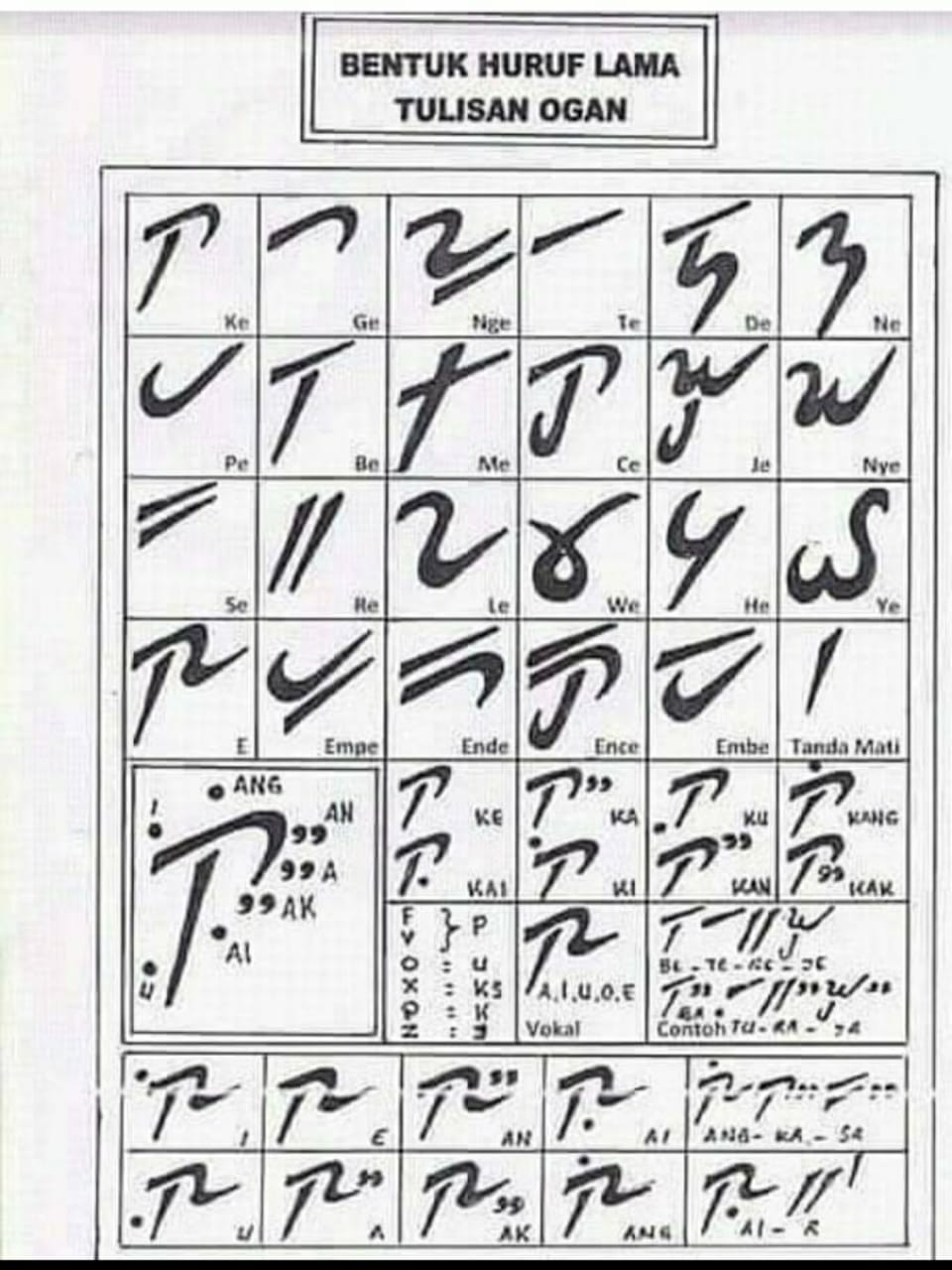
- Script type: Abugida
- Period: ?–present
- Region: Sumatra, Indonesia
- Languages: Ogan language

Related scripts
- Parent systems: Egyptian hieroglyphs: Phoenician; Aramaic; Brahmi; Pallava; Old Kawi; Ulu; Ogan script
- Sister systems: Kerinci, Lampung, Lembak, Pasemah, Rejang, Serawai

Part of a series on

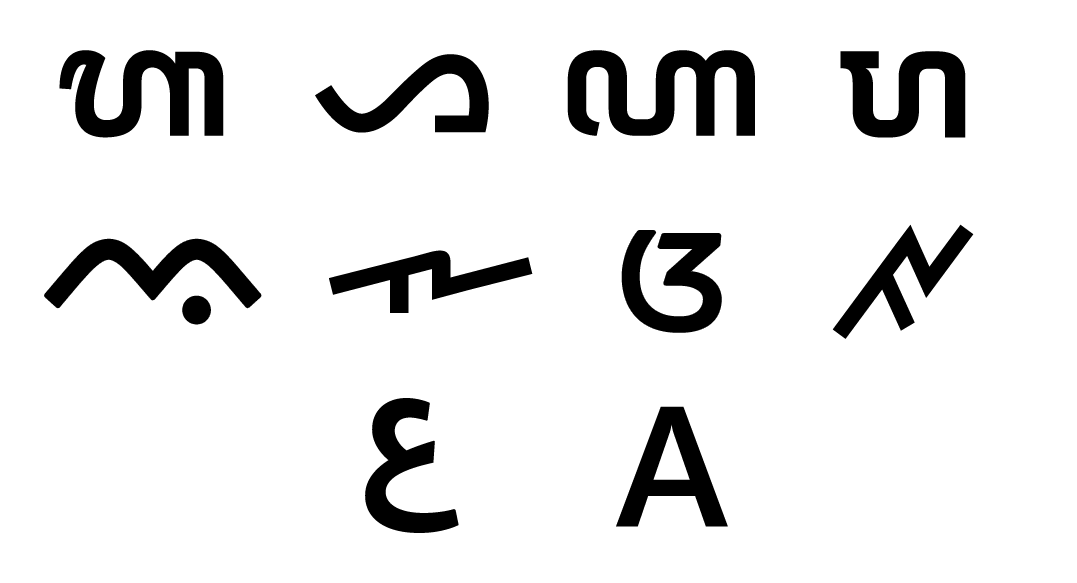

Writing systems used in Indonesia
Abugida (Brahmic)
- Balinese
- Batak
- Buda
- Javanese
- Kawi
- Lontara (Satera Jontal, Mbojo)
- Makasar
- Sasak
- Sundanese (Old Sundanese)
- Ulu (Incung, Komering, Lampung, Lembak,
- Ogan, Pasemah, Rejang, Serawai)
Abjad
- Buri Wolio
- Jawi
- Jawoe
- Pegon
Alphabet
- Latin (Van Ophuijsen, Suwandi, EYD)
Others
- Alifuru
- Bonda
- Cia-Cia
- Bilang-bilang
- Dunging
Related
- List of writing systems of Indonesia
- Languages of Indonesia

The Ogan script is an abugida used to write the Ogan dialect of South Barisan Malay, spoken along the Ogan River. It belongs to the group of Ulu scripts.
