= Buri Wolio =

Modified Arabic script for Wolio writing

Buri Wolio بُرِ وٚلِيٚ
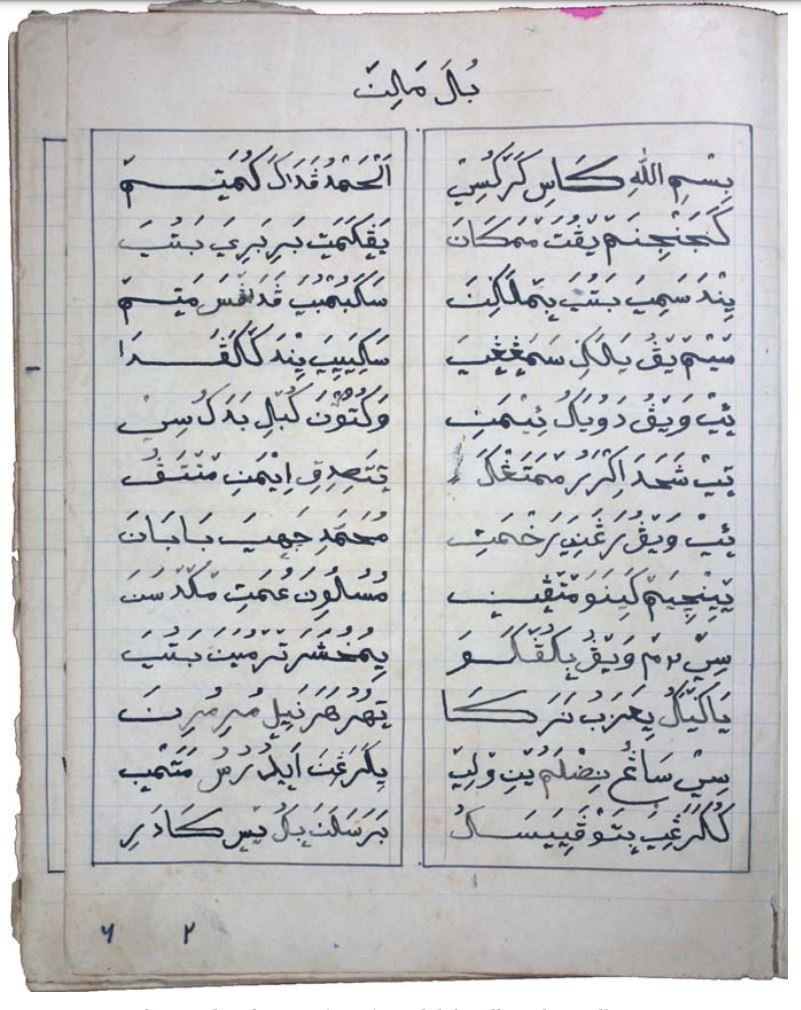
- Islamic poetry in Buri Wolio
- Script type: Abjad
- Period: c. 16 c. to the present
- Direction: Right-to-left
- Languages: Wolio

Related scripts
- Parent systems: Proto-Sinaitic: Phoenician; Aramaic; Nabataean; Arabic; Buri Wolio
- Sister systems: Pegon script, Jawi script, Sorabe alphabet

Part of a series on

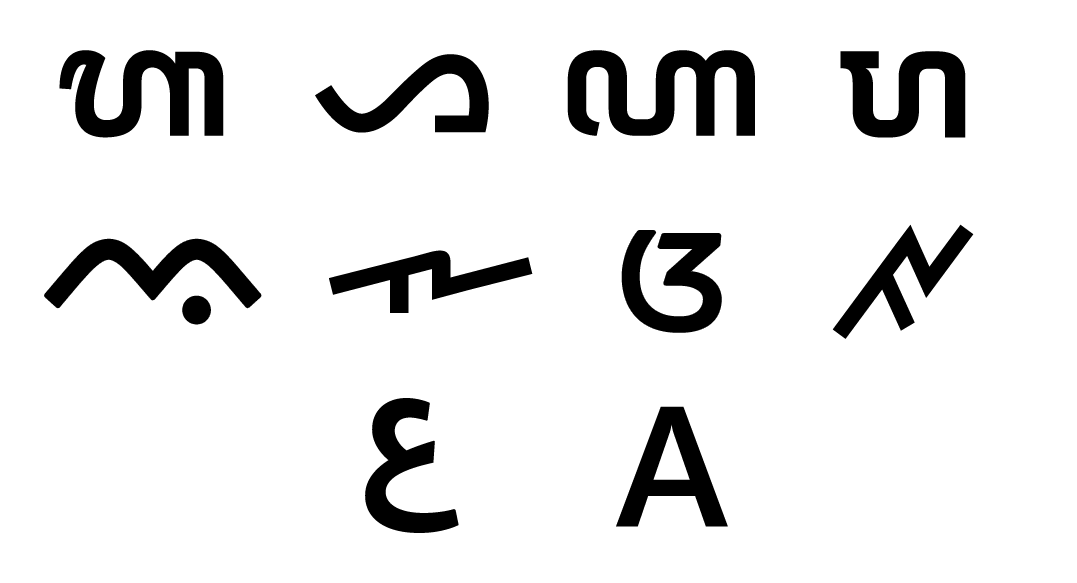

Writing systems used in Indonesia
Abugida (Brahmic)
- Balinese
- Batak
- Buda
- Javanese
- Kawi
- Lontara (Satera Jontal, Mbojo)
- Makasar
- Sasak
- Sundanese (Old Sundanese)
- Ulu (Incung, Komering, Lampung, Lembak,
- Ogan, Pasemah, Rejang, Serawai)
Abjad
- Buri Wolio
- Jawi
- Jawoe
- Pegon
Alphabet
- Latin (Van Ophuijsen, Suwandi, EYD)
Others
- Alifuru
- Bonda
- Cia-Cia
- Bilang-bilang
- Dunging
Related
- List of writing systems of Indonesia
- Languages of Indonesia

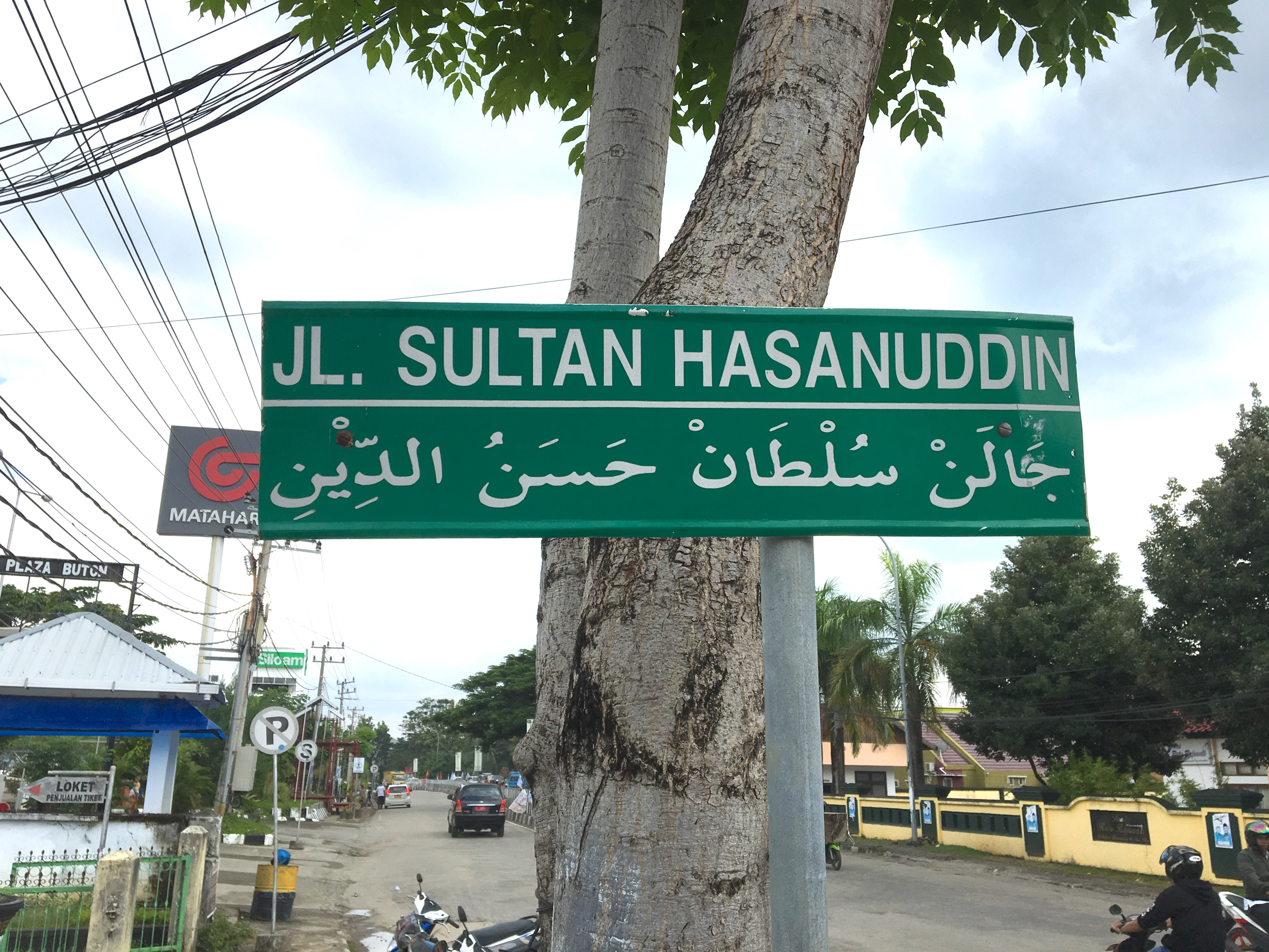
A dual-language street sign, Jl. Sultan Hasanuddin, in Baubau, written in both the Indonesian language and Buri Wolio

Buri Wolio (Wolio: بُرِ وٚلِيٚ) is an Arabic script modified to write Wolio, a language spoken in and around Baubau, the capital of Buton, Southeast Sulawesi, Indonesia. Generally, this script is the same as the Jawi script, except in Buri Wolio, vowel sounds are written. This script has 35 letters, 28 letters from Arabic alphabet and 7 additional letters similar to those in Jawi script to represent sounds not found in Arabic. Of these, 22 are used for writing of Wolio language, while 13 are reserved for writing loanwords of Arabic (and European) origin.

Buri Wolio is similar in most aspects to Jawi script, except that in addition to the 3 diacritics in Arabic and Jawi, Buri Wolio has two additional diacritics for expressing the /e/ and /u/ vowel sounds.

It is unclear when Buri Wolio script was first created and used, but according to the oldest Buton manuscripts that have been found, it is estimated that this script has existed since the arrival of Islam on Buton Island in the 16th century. As Wolio language was the lingua franca of Sultanate of Buton, this script was used in writing ancient texts in Buton, including; texts of laws, religious texts and diplomatic letters.

In addition, this script has also been used to write kaḃanti (كَڀَنْتِ), a traditional type of long poetry consisting of lines, each with a pair of verses. The tradition of writing kaḃanti in Buton reached its peak of popularity in the 19th century (1824–1851), namely during the reign of the 29th Sultan of Buton, Muhammad Idrus Kaimuddin. For the people of Buton, besides from being known as a sultan, he is also known as a famous scholar and poet of Buton. As a poet, he composed a lot of kaḃanti literature, especially those based on Islamic teachings. Other than Muhammad Idrus Kaimuddin, several other Butonese poets came from the royal family of Buton, such as La Ode Kobu (Metapasina Bādia), La Ode Nafiu (Yarona Labuandiri), and H. Abdul Ganiu (Kenepulu Bula).

== Alphabet ==
=== Letters ===
Buri Wolio script consists of 22 primary characters, of which 15 are from Arabic Script, and 7 are new characters, made by adding dots to existing Arabic Characters, similar to characters of the Jawi script. These new characters are highlighted in the table below. There are an additional 13 characters, that are exclusively used for writing of loanwords taken from Arabic or from European languages.

Primary Characters of Buri Wolio
Name	Forms				Sound represented	Latin equivalent	Notes
Name	Isolated	Final	Medial	Initial	Sound represented	Latin equivalent	Notes
ʾalif أَلِف	ا	ـا			/ʔ/	ā / ʾ	Pronounced as /ʔ/ in Wolio. Can be pronounced as /ā/ in loanwords.
bāʾ باء	ب	ـب	ـبـ	بـ	/b/	b	A regressive /b/ phoneme
ḃā ڀَا	ڀ	ـڀ	ـڀـ	ڀـ	/bʰ/	ḃ	New letter not present in Arabic
tāʾ تاء	ت	ـت	ـتـ	تـ	/t/	t	
jīm جِيم	ج	ـج	ـجـ	جـ	/d͡ʒ/	j	
cā چَا	چ	ـچ	ـچـ	چـ	/t͡ʃ/	c	New letter not present in Arabic
dal دَال	د	ـد			/d/	d	A Plosive /d/ phoneme
ḋā ڊَا	ڊ	ـڊ			/dʰ/	ḋ	New letter not present in Arabic
rāʾ رَاء	ر	ـر			/r/	r	
zāyn زَاين	ز	ـز			/z/	z	
sīn سِين	س	ـس	ـسـ	سـ	/s/	s	
ngā ڠَا	ڠ	ـڠ	ـڠـ	ڠـ	/ŋ/	ng	New letter not present in Arabic
pā ڨَا	ڤ	ـڤ	ـڤـ	ڤـ	/p/	p	New letter not present in Arabic
kāf كَاف	ك	ـك	ـكـ	كـ	/k/	k	
gā ڬَا	ڬ	ـڬ	ـڬـ	ڬـ	/ɡ/	g	New letter not present in Arabic
lām لاَم	ل	ـل	ـلـ	لـ	/l/	l	
mīm مِيم	م	ـم	ـمـ	مـ	/m/	m	
nūn نون	ن	ـن	ـنـ	نـ	/n/	n	
nyā ۑَا	ۑ	ـۑ	ـۑـ	ۑـ	/ɲ/	ny	New letter not present in Arabic
hāʾ هَاء	ه	ـه	ـهـ	هـ	/h/	h	
wāw وَاو	و	ـو			/w/		
yāʾ ياء	ي	ـي	ـيـ	يـ	/a/	a / y	Pronounced as /a/ in Wolio. But in foreign words, pronounced as /j/

Additional Characters
Name	Forms				Sound represented	Latin equivalent
Name	Isolated	Final	Medial	Initial	Sound represented	Latin equivalent
ṡāʾ ثَاء	ث	ـث	ـثـ	ثـ	/s/	s
Ha حَاء	ح	ـح	ـحـ	حـ	/h/	ḥ
khāʾ خَاء	خ	ـخ	ـخـ	خـ	/x/	kh
żāl ذَال	ذ	ـذ			/z/	z
syin شِين	ش	ـش	ـشـ	شـ	/ʃ/	sy
ṣād صَاد	ص	ـص	ـصـ	صـ	/s/	s
ḍād ضَاد	ض	ـض	ـضـ	ضـ	/d/	d
ṭāʾ طَاء	ط	ـط	ـطـ	طـ	/t/	t
ẓāʾ ظَاء	ظ	ـظ	ـظـ	ظـ	/z/	z
ʿayn عَيْن	ع	ـع	ـعـ	عـ	/ʔ/	ʿ
ghayn غَيْن	غ	ـغ	ـغـ	غـ	/ɣ/	gh
fāʾ فَاء	ف	ـف	ـفـ	فـ	/f/	f
qāf قَاف	ق	ـق	ـقـ	قـ	/q/	q

=== Vowel Diacritics ===
The purpose of vowel diacritics in an Abjad script is to give vowels to each consonants. Unlike its neighbouring relatives, Jawi and Pegon, Buri Wolio cannot be read without diacritics. The shape and position of diacritic is very important. There are 6 diacritics in Buri Wolio, which include the Sukun diacritic (zero-vowel), the 3 diacritics inherited from Arabic, representing sounds /a/, /i/, and /u/, as well as two new diacritics unique to Buri Wolio, representing diacritics /e/ (U+08F9) and /o/ (U+065A). All of these diacritics represent short vowel sounds. With the help of the letters "ا", "و", or "ي", diacritics can also represent long vowel sounds.

Vowel diacritics in Buri Wolio
Sukun (Zero-vowel)	Short					Long				
Sukun (Zero-vowel)	-a	-i	-u	-e	-o	-ā	-ī	-ū	-ē	-ō
◌ْ	◌َ	◌ِ	◌ُ	◌ࣹ	◌ٚ	◌َا	◌ِيْـ / ◌ِيْ	◌ُوْ	◌ࣹيْـ / ◌ࣹيْ	◌ٚوْ

Vowel as first sound of syllable
Short					Long				
A	I	U	E	O	Ā	Ī	Ū	Ē	Ō
يَـ / يَ	يِـ / يِ	يُـ / يُ	يࣹـ / يࣹ	يٚـ / يٚ	يَا	يِيْـ / يِيْ	يُوْ	يࣹيْـ / يࣹيْ	يٚوْ

Vowel following a consonant
Sukun (Zero-vowel)	Short					Long				
S	Sa	Si	Su	Se	So	Sā	Sī	Sū	Sē	Sō
سْـ / سْ	سَـ / سَ	سِـ / سِ	سُـ / سُ	سࣹـ / سࣹ	سٚـ / سٚ	سَا	سِيْـ / سِيْ	سُوْ	سࣹيْـ / سࣹيْ	سٚوْ

== Reduplication ==
In Buri Wolio, Reduplication is done in a manner similar to Jawi script and Pegon script, that is with the use of the numeral "٢" right after the base word.

While suffixed, the numeral "٢" comes in between the base word and the suffix, effectively being in the middle of the word.

Below are some sample words:

Buri Wolio	Latin
هُمْبُ۲	humbu-humbu
سُمْبࣹ۲	sumbe-sumbe
يِنْچࣹمَ۲	incema-incema
ڠَوُ۲نَ	ngawu-ngawuna

== Sample Text ==
Below is a sample except of Wolio language poem "Kaḃanti Bunga Malati", which was rewritten in modern Latin Wolio Script in 2004.

Wolio		Indonesian Translation
Buri Wolio	Latin	Indonesian Translation
مِنْچُيَنَڨٚ يِسَرٚڠِ رَڠْكَيࣹيَ نࣹسَبُتُنَ يَڀَرِ اَرَتَانَ تَبࣹيَنَمٚ يِسَرٚڠِ رَڠْكَيࣹيَ هࣹڠْڬَ حَقُنَ يَڨࣹكَڊُوَيَكَمٚ	Mincuanapo isarongi rangkaea Ne sabutuna aḃari ʾaratāna Tabeanamo isarongi rangkaea Hengga ḥaquna apekaḋuwaakamo	Belumlah dikatakan orang kaya Kalau hanya banyak hartanya Tapi yang dikatakan kaya Miliknya pun rela diberikannya
مِنْچُيَنَڨٚ يِسَرٚڠِ مِسِكِنِ نࣹسَبُتُنَ يِنْدَ تࣹئَرَتَانَ تَبࣹيَنَمٚ يِسَرٚڠِ مِسِكِنِ يَڨࣹيْلُيَ عَرَسِ كٚحَقُنَ	Mincuanapo isarongi misikini Ne sabutuna inda teʾaratāna Tabeanamo isarongi misikini Apēlua ʿarasi koḥaquna	Bukanlah dinamakan orang miskin Jika hanya tidak punya harta Sebenarnya orang miskin itu (adalah orang yang) Masih mengharapkan hak sesamanya
مِنْچُيَنَڨٚ يِسَرٚڠِ مَرَدِكَ نࣹسَبُتُنَ يَڨٚوْڨُيَ يِڨَيُ تَبࣹيَنَمٚ يِسَرٚڠِ مَرَدِكَ يَمَرَدِكَمٚ يِوَانَ نَرَكَا	Mincuanapo isarongi maradika Ne sabutuna apōpua ipau Tabeanamo isarongi maradika Amaradikamo iwāna narakā	Belumlah dikatakan merdeka Kalau hanya memangku jabatan Sebenarnya yang (dikatakan) merdeka itu (adalah orang yang) Sudah bebas dari api neraka

== See also ==
- Pegon alphabet
- Jawi script
