= Cia-Cia language =

Austronesian language spoken on Buton island, Indonesia

Cia-Cia
- Butonese
- Bahasa Ciacia 바하사 찌아찌아 بَهَسَ چِيَ۲
- Native to: Indonesia
- Region: Baubau, Buton Island, Southeast Sulawesi
- Ethnicity: Butonese
- Native speakers: 105,000 (2012)
- Language family: Austronesian: Malayo-Polynesian; Celebic; Muna–Buton; Buton; Cia-Cia
- Writing system: Latin; Hangul; Gundhul (historical)

Language codes
- ISO 639-3: cia
- Glottolog: ciac1237
- Map of languages on the island of Sulawesi, Muna-Buton languages is colored in dark with Cia-Cia language is in number 58.

Part of a series on

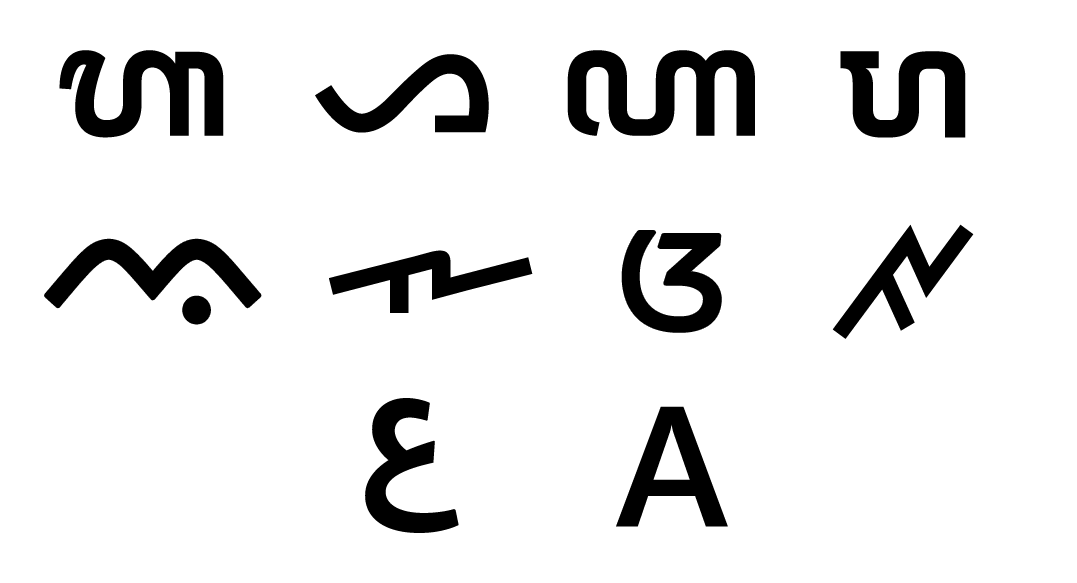

Writing systems used in Indonesia
Abugida (Brahmic)
- Balinese
- Batak
- Buda
- Javanese
- Kawi
- Lontara (Satera Jontal, Mbojo)
- Makasar
- Sasak
- Sundanese (Old Sundanese)
- Ulu (Incung, Komering, Lampung, Lembak,
- Ogan, Pasemah, Rejang, Serawai)
Abjad
- Buri Wolio
- Jawi
- Jawoe
- Pegon
Alphabet
- Latin (Van Ophuijsen, Suwandi, EYD)
Others
- Alifuru
- Bonda
- Cia-Cia
- Bilang-bilang
- Dunging
Related
- List of writing systems of Indonesia
- Languages of Indonesia

Sample of spoken Cia-Cia, recorded for Wikitongues

Cia-Cia (Hangul: 찌아찌아), also known as South Buton or Butonese, is an Austronesian language spoken principally around the city of Baubau on the southern tip of Buton island, off the southeast coast of Sulawesi, in Indonesia. It is written using the Latin and Hangul scripts.

== Demographics ==
In 2012, there were 105,000 speakers of Cia-Cia, many of whom also used Wolio, which is closely related to Cia-Cia, as well as Indonesian. Wolio is falling into disuse as a written language among the Cia-Cia, as it is written using the Arabic script, and Indonesian is now taught in schools using the Latin script.

In two of the approximately 75 Cia-Cia-speaking subdistricts, the language has been privately taught to schoolchildren using the Hangul script since 2008. The students are also taught some basic Korean. The program remained active as of 2025.

== Geographic distribution ==
Cia-Cia is spoken in Southeast Sulawesi, south Buton Island, Binongko Island, and Batu Atas Island.

According to legend, Cia-Cia speakers on Binongko descend from Butonese troops sent by a Butonese sultan.

== Name ==
The name of the language comes from the negator cia, "no". It is also known as Buton, Butonese, Butung, and in Dutch Boetonees, names it shares with Wolio, and as South(ern) Buton or Butung. The ambiguous name "Buton", often referring generically to various ethnic and linguistic groups of the Buton area, is said to be of Ternatese origin (butu – "market", "marketplace"). Names such as "South Buton" can be used to disambiguate from Wolio, the historically dominant language of the island.

== Dialects ==
The language situation on the island of Buton is very complicated and not known in great detail.

Dialects include Kaesabu, Sampolawa (Mambulu-Laporo), Wabula (with its subvarieties), and Masiri. The Masiri dialect shows the greatest amount of vocabulary in common with the standard dialect. The Pedalaman dialect uses gh—equivalent to r in other dialects—in native vocabulary, and r in loan words.

== Phonology ==
Phonology according to Rene van den Berg (1991).

=== Consonants ===
		Bilabial	Alveolar	Postalveolar	Velar	Uvular	Glottal
Nasal		m	n		ŋ		
Stop	voiceless	p	t	t͡ʃ	k		ʔ
Stop	prenasal vl.	ᵐp	ⁿt	ᶮt͡ʃ	ᵑk		
Stop	voiced	b	d	d͡ʒ	ɡ		
Stop	prenasal vd.	ᵐb	ⁿd		ᵑɡ		
Stop	implosive	ɓ	ɗ				
Fricative			s		(ɣ)		h
Approximant		β	l	(j)			
Trill			r			(ʁ)	

Notes:

- /t/ is realized as a palatal affricate [t͡ʃ] before high vowels /i/ and /u/
- /r/ is either an alveolar trill [r], or a voiced velar fricative [ɣ] or uvular trill /ʀ/, depending on the dialect

=== Vowels ===
Cia-Cia has a common five-vowel system.

	Front	Back
Close	i	u
Mid	e	o
Open	a	

/e, o/ may also be heard as open-mid [ɛ, ɔ].

== Orthography ==
Cia-Cia was once written in a Jawi-like script called Gundhul, based on Arabic, with five additional consonant letters but no signs for vowels.

=== Hangul ===
The Korean alphabet, called Hangul internationally, was invented in the 15th century. The writing system has since received significant praise from international linguists and is now considered a point of pride for Koreans. South Korean linguists have been attempting to spread the script outside of Korea, particularly to languages that do not yet have their own writing systems. In the 1990s, a Hangul-based alphabet was devised for the Lahu language of China and Southeast Asia, but this did not see significant adoption.

Lee Ki-nam (이기남) became a significant force in advocating for Hangul's use for Cia-Cia. During the 1910–1945 Japanese colonial period in Korea, teaching Hangul was at times persecuted. Lee's father was a linguist who was once dismissed from a teaching position for secretly teaching Hangul to his students. Around the 1990s, after retiring from her career, Lee Ki-nam began to do missionary and charitable work, and she developed an interest in spreading Hangul to ethnic groups with languages that did not already have well-established writing systems. Beginning in 2003, with the help of South Korean Christian missionaries, she tried to spread Hangul in Nepal, Mongolia, Vietnam, and China, but her efforts had limited success, so she began contacting linguists to aid her in this task. In 2007, she met with Kim Ju-won (김주원), a linguist at Seoul National University (SNU), who, along with several others, expressed interest in the project. In October of that year, they established the Hunminjeongeum Society. In July 2008, Lee led a delegation to Baubau to discuss the potential of adopting Hangul for Cia-Cia. She offered to build a $500,000 Korean cultural center and establish economic ties between the area and South Korea; the deal was accepted. Donations were also sent from South Korea to Baubau; Jeong Hyeon-tae (정현태), head of Namhae County, sent around ₩5 million ($4,000) worth of school supplies to Baubau.

Two teachers representing two language groups in Baubau went to Seoul for a six-month training course in Hangul at SNU. One of them quit, but the other returned to Baubau in July 2009 to begin teaching Hangul to 50 third-graders. This later expanded to two more schools. The then-mayor of Baubau, Amirul Tamim, said he would consult the Indonesian government on whether Hangul could be adopted as an official script. However, Chun Tai-hyun, a linguist who first proposed the project to Tamim in 2007, said he found the prospect unlikely, as Indonesian law requires that all tribal languages use the Latin script for national unity.

The project encountered difficulties between the city of Baubau, the Hunminjeongeum Society, and the Seoul Metropolitan Government, in 2011. The King Sejong Institute, which had been established in Baubau in 2011 to teach Hangul to locals, abandoned its offices after a year of operation, in 2012. In January 2020, the publication of the first Cia-Cia dictionary in Hangul was announced; it was published in December 2021. This renewed interest in Hangul for Cia-Cia, and the King Sejong Institute reopened its offices in Baubau in 2022. In December 2023, Agence France-Presse again published an article with interviews showcasing the Hangul effort.

As of 2025, Cia-Cia's use of Hangul remains limited to schools and local signs in the two subdistricts that originally adopted the program.

Cia-Cia alphabets
Consonants			Vowels		
IPA	Latin	Hangul	IPA	Latin	Hangul
/ɡ/	g	ㄱ	/a/	a	ㅏ
/k/	k	ㄲ	/e/	e	ㅔ
/n/	n	ㄴ	/o/	o	ㅗ
/d/	d	ㄷ	/u/	u	ㅜ
/ɗ/	dh	ㅌ	/i/	i	ㅣ
/t/	t	ㄸ	(null)		ㅡ
/r/	r~gh	ㄹ			
/ʁ/	r~gh	ㅋ			
/l/	l	을ㄹ (Note: ᄙ is not a separate letter. The medial /r/ and /l/ are distinguished by writing a single letter (ㄹ) for /r/ and double (ᄙ) for /l/. Double ㄹ must be written in two syllables. This use of a double consonant can be unambiguous, as double or syllable-final /l/ or /r/ do not exist in Cia-Cia, since the phonotactics only allow (C)V structure (with each prenasalized consonant analyzed as a single consonant phoneme).) (Note: Null-consonant and vowel letters (으) are added for initial /l/ and initial prenasalized consonants (/ᵐp/, /ⁿt/, /ᶮt͡ʃ/, /ᵑk/, /ᵐb/, /ⁿd/, /ᵑɡ/). When these consonants occur between vowels, they are written with one jamo in the previous syllable block and the other jamo in the following syllable block.)			
/m/	m	ㅁ			
/b/	b	ㅂ			
/β/	v~w	ㅸ			
/ɓ/	bh	ㅍ			
/p/	p	ㅃ			
/s/	s	ㅅ			
/ʔ/	'	ㅇ			
/ŋ/	ng	ㅇ			
/dʒ/	j	ㅈ			
/tʃ/	c	ㅉ			
/h/	h	ㅎ			
/ᵐb/	mb	음ㅂ			
/ᵐp/	mp	음ㅃ			
/ⁿd/	nd	은ㄷ			
/ⁿt/	nd	은ㄸ			
/ᶮt͡ʃ/	nc	은ㅉ			
/ᵑɡ/	ŋg	은ㄱ			
/ᵑk/	ŋk	은ㄲ			

== Examples ==
=== Words ===
Cia-Cia, like Muna, has three sets of numerals: a free form, a prefixed form, and a reduplicated form. The prefixed form is used before units of 10 (pulu), 100 (hacu), and 1,000 (riwu), and before classifiers and measure nouns. The reduplicated form is used after units of ten when counting. ompulu is an irregular exception.

Numerals
	Latin	Hangul
1	dise, ise	디세, 이세
2	rua, ghua	루아, 쿠아
3	tolu	똘루
4	pa'a	빠아
5	lima	을리마
6	no'o	노오
7	picu	삐쭈
8	walu, oalu	ᄫᅡᆯ루, 오알루
9	siua	시우아
10	ompulu	옴뿔루
29	rua-pulu-po-picu	루아-뿔루-뽀-삐쭈
80	walu-pulu	ᄫᅡᆯ루-뿔루

=== Sentences ===
An example of the Hangul script, followed by the Latin alphabet and IPA:

아디 세링 빨리 노논또 뗄레ᄫᅵ시. 아마노 노뽀옴바에 이아 나누몬또 뗄레ᄫᅵ시 꼴리에 노몰렝오.
Adi sering pali nononto televisi. Amano nopo'ombae ia nanumonto televisi kolie nomolengo.
aɗi seriŋ pali nononto teleβisi amano nopoʔomɓa.e i.a nanumonto teleβisi koli.e nomoleŋo.
Adi.NOM often very 3R-watch television. Father-3POS 3R-tell-3DO he 3IR-watch television don't 3R-VM-long
Adi often watches television. His father advises him not to watch too much TV.

Rene van den Berg (1991) provides a few more examples.
