= Incung script =

Script of Kerinci language of Sumatra

Incung script Kerinci script
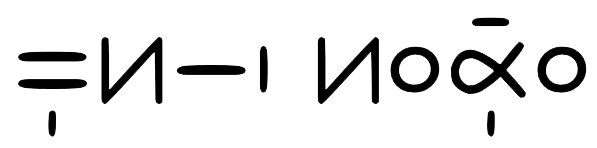
- 'Suhat incoung' (Incoung script), written with said script
- Script type: Abugida
- Languages: Kerinci

Related scripts
- Parent systems: Egyptian hieroglyphs: Proto-Sinaitic; Phoenician; Aramaic; Brahmi; Tamil-Brahmi; Pallava; Old Kawi; Ulu; Incung script
- Sister systems: Lampung script Ogan script Rejang alphabet

Part of a series on

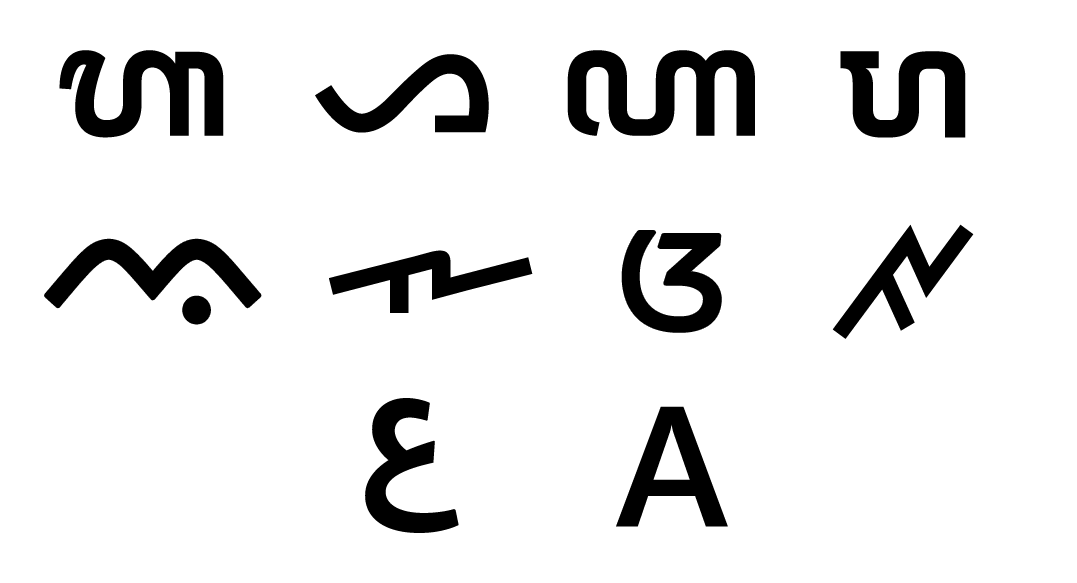

Writing systems used in Indonesia
Abugida (Brahmic)
- Balinese
- Batak
- Buda
- Javanese
- Kawi
- Lontara (Satera Jontal, Mbojo)
- Makasar
- Sasak
- Sundanese (Old Sundanese)
- Ulu (Incung, Komering, Lampung, Lembak,
- Ogan, Pasemah, Rejang, Serawai)
Abjad
- Buri Wolio
- Jawi
- Pegon
Alphabet
- Latin (Van Ophuijsen, Suwandi, EYD)
Others
- Alifuru
- Bonda
- Cia-Cia
- Bilang-bilang
- Dunging
Related
- List of writing systems of Indonesia
- Languages of Indonesia

The Incung script (sometimes Kerinci script) is an abugida which was traditionally used to write the Kerinci language. It belongs to the group of Ulu scripts.

The Incung script is the only known indigenous script discovered in central Sumatra, related to both the Lampung script, employed in the Lampung language, and the Rencong script, used in the Rejang language of southern Sumatra. Linguistically, incung means slanted or tilted in the Kerinci language. This script is composed of straight lines, broken and tilted segments, and curves, written at a slight angle. The Incung script is a cultural heritage left by the ancestors of the Kerinci people. This script was used to document the history of the ancestors, literature in the form of romantic and sorrowful prose, customary agreements, and spells.

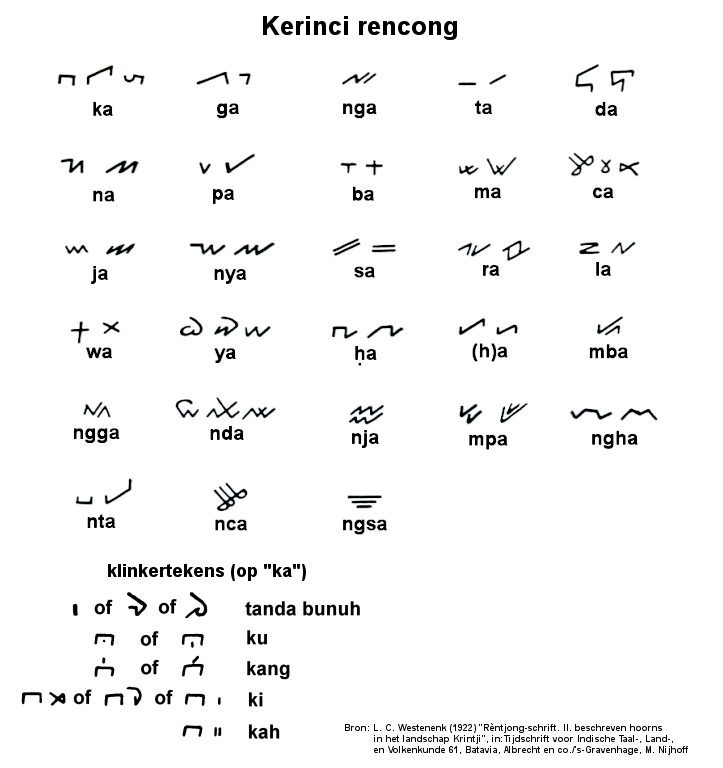
Writing in Incung script
