= Buda script =

Archaic script used in Java and Bali

Buda Script Aksara Buda
- Script type: Abugida
- Period: Circa 14th–18th centuries, and present (optional & research)
- Direction: Left-to-right
- Languages: Old Sundanese language Old Javanese language

Related scripts
- Parent systems: Proto-Sinaitic alphabet: Phoenician alphabet; Aramaic alphabet; Brāhmī; Pallava; Old Kawi; Buda Script
- Sister systems: Balinese; Batak; Baybayin scripts Javanese; Lontara; Lampung; Makasar; Old Sundanese; Rencong; Rejang

Part of a series on

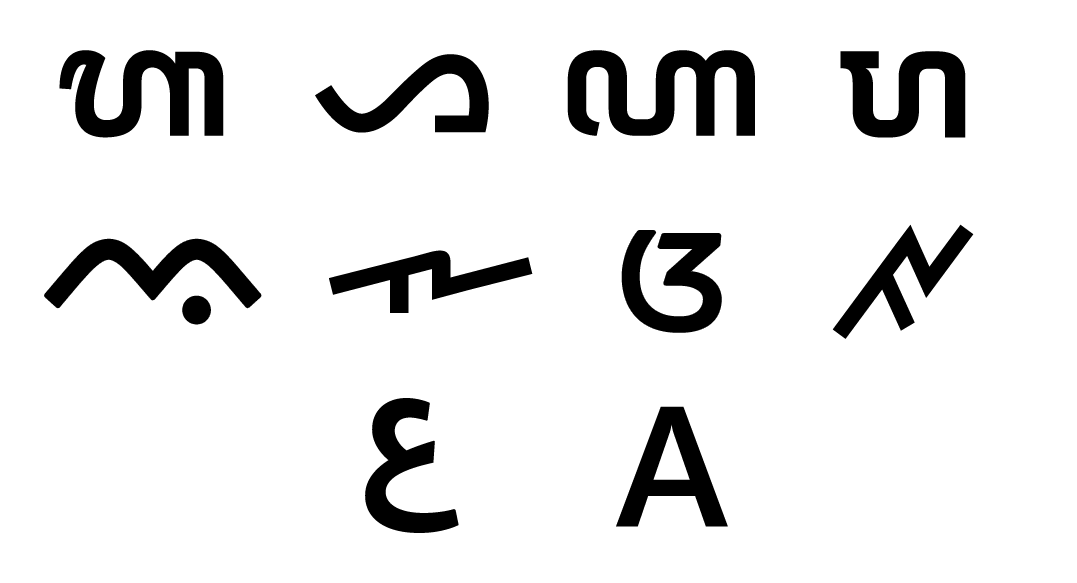

Writing systems used in Indonesia
Abugida (Brahmic)
- Balinese
- Batak
- Buda
- Javanese
- Kawi
- Lontara (Satera Jontal, Mbojo)
- Makasar
- Sasak
- Sundanese (Old Sundanese)
- Ulu (Incung, Komering, Lampung, Lembak,
- Ogan, Pasemah, Rejang, Serawai)
Abjad
- Buri Wolio
- Jawi
- Jawoe
- Pegon
Alphabet
- Latin (Van Ophuijsen, Suwandi, EYD)
Others
- Alifuru
- Bonda
- Cia-Cia
- Bilang-bilang
- Dunging
Related
- List of writing systems of Indonesia
- Languages of Indonesia

Buda script, Aksara Buda, or Gunung script is an archaic script. Based on its shape, the Buda Script still has a close relationship with the Kawi script. This script was previously used on the island of Java (especially in West Java and Central Java) and Bali. The script is called the Buda script because it is considered to have originated from the pre-Islamic era which is called the Buddhist Age—the word Buda is based on the word Buddha. Manuscripts containing writing using the Buda script are commonly found in mountainous areas, hence the name Gunung, or mountain.

== Name confusion ==
The mention of the Buda script appears in the book The History of Java by Thomas Stamford Raffles in 1817. The mention of the Buda script or Gunung script was further suggested by Casparis (1975). Based on the literature review, the name Aksara Buda or Aksara Gunung can refer to two script models, namely the script used in lontar manuscripts from the Merapi-Merbabu collection in Central Java, and in gebang manuscripts originating from West Java. The Arjunawiwaha and Kunjarakarna texts are contained in several manuscripts, the two texts of which are written in the Merapi-Merbabu Buda model script model and some are using the West Java Buda model script.

== Merapi-Merbabu's model ==
Merapi-Merbabu model script is used to refer to the script model used in the collection of manuscripts found on the slopes of Mount Merapi-Merbabu, the shape of the script is distinctive, different from Javanese and Balinese script. Manuscripts of the Merbabu collection (currently stored in the National Library of Indonesia) that use this script include Darmawarsa, Gita Sinangsaya, and Kunjarakarna, which are written in Old Javanese language. In addition, there is a manuscript originating from the Pekalongan area that uses this model script and use Old Sundanese language, namely the Kala Purbaka manuscript. One manuscript with this script model was found in Buleleng, Bali in 2019. Texts written in this script generally contain an overview of Hindu-Buddhist religions with local beliefs, but in some parts there are elements of Islamic religion.

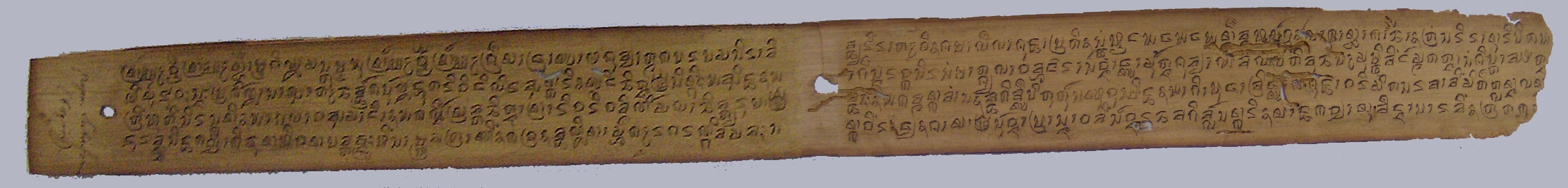
Kakawin of Sutasoma lontar in Buda script

== West Java's model ==
Various names for this script have been suggested by several ancient manuscripts, including K.F. Holle (1877) called it Kawi-squared script (Kawi-kwadraat-letter), Pigeaud (1968) called it West Java's semi-cursive thick script, while Casparis called it the Buda or Gunung script. The confusion over the naming of the script model in the gebang script which is quite different was raised by Andrea Acri in his dissertation when discussing the Dharma Patanjala manuscript. The manuscripts he worked on were traced from the Merapi-Merbabu collection in Central Java, but he further estimates that at first the manuscripts originated in West Java, where the tradition of gebang script writing was more developed. Therefore, he made a special alternative designation for the Buddhist script written on gebang leaves, namely the Western Old Javanese Script.

The Buda script model originating from West Java is written on gebang leaf media (formerly known as nipah), using organic black ink. The style used is thin. The manuscripts that use this model script use Old Sundanese language, such as Sang Hyang Siksa Kandang Karesian, Sang Hyang Raga Dewata, Sang Hyang Tatwa Ajnyana, and Langgeng Jati. In addition there are those who use Old Javanese language such as Sang Hyang Hayu, Dharma Patanjala, Arjunawiwaha, and Bhimaswarga.

Kakawin Arjunawiwaha which uses the West Javanese model of the Buddhist script is the oldest known manuscript (written in 1344 AD), originally from the Bandung area. In Van der Molen's research, the Kunjarakarna manuscript in the collection of the Leiden University Library, LOr code 2266, which was written in the West Java model of Buda script, had the highest level of accuracy among the other manuscripts he studied.

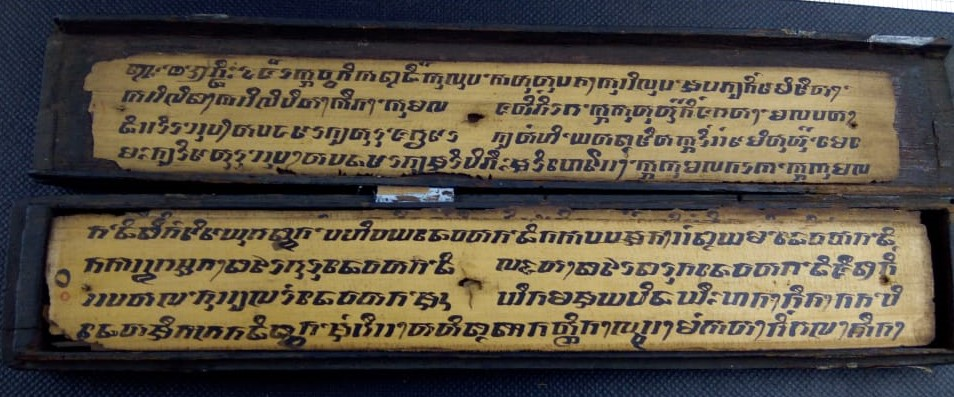
Buda script in the Old Sundanese Gebang manuscript
