= Kaganga =

Kaganga is the native name for the following indigenous scripts used in Indonesia:

- The Rencong a.k.a. Incung script, used for Kerinci language
- The Rejang script, used for Rejang language
- The Lampung script, used for Lampung language
