= Ulu scripts =

Writing system family from Sumatra, Indonesia

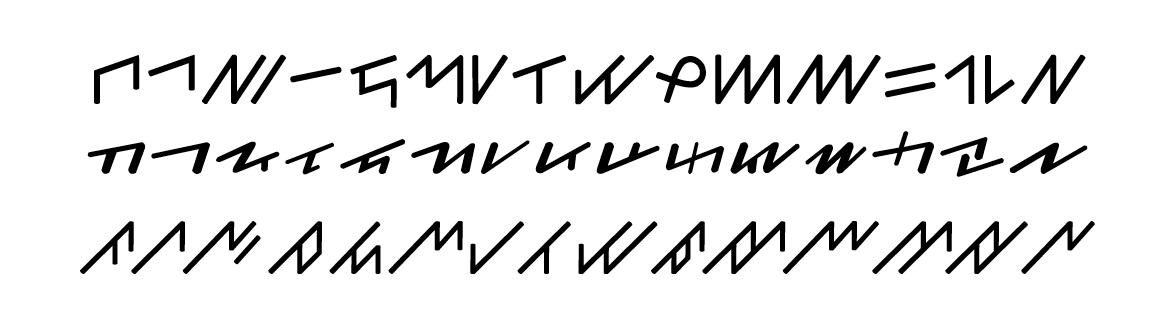
- Examples of the Ulu family of scripts: Incung (top), Lampung (middle), and Rejang (bottom)
- Script type: Abugida
- Period: c. 13th–present
- Direction: Left-to-right
- Region: Sumatra, Indonesia
- Languages: Malay, Bengkulu, Kerinci, Lampung, Rejang, Serawai, and others

Related scripts
- Parent systems: Egyptian hieroglyphs: Phoenician alphabet; Aramaic; Brahmi; Tamil-Brahmi; Pallava; Old Kawi; Ulu scripts
- Sister systems: Balinese; Batak; Baybayin scripts Javanese; Lontara; Makasar; Old Sundanese

Unicode
- Unicode range: U+A930–U+A95F Rejang

Part of a series on

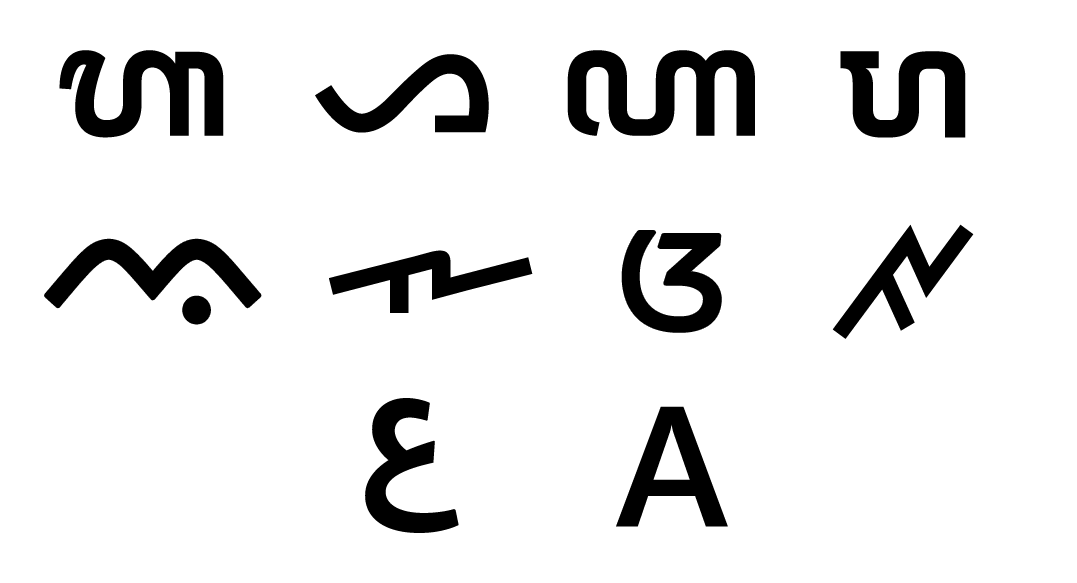

Writing systems used in Indonesia
Abugida (Brahmic)
- Balinese
- Batak
- Buda
- Javanese
- Kawi
- Lontara (Satera Jontal, Mbojo)
- Makasar
- Sasak
- Sundanese (Old Sundanese)
- Ulu (Incung, Komering, Lampung, Lembak,
- Ogan, Pasemah, Rejang, Serawai)
Abjad
- Buri Wolio
- Jawi
- Jawoe
- Pegon
Alphabet
- Latin (Van Ophuijsen, Suwandi, EYD)
Others
- Alifuru
- Bonda
- Cia-Cia
- Bilang-bilang
- Dunging
Related
- List of writing systems of Indonesia
- Languages of Indonesia

The Ulu scripts, locally known as Surat Ulu ('upstream script') (Note: The term Surat Ulu which refers to the Rencong or Ka-Ga-Nga script is found, among others, in the Mal. 6873, Mal 6874, Mal. 6884, Mal. 6877, and L.Or. 12.247 (Leiden University Library) manuscripts.) are a family of writing systems found in the regions of Kerinci, Bengkulu, Palembang and Lampung, in central and south Sumatra, Indonesia. They were used to write manuscripts in late-old to classical Malay (by Rejang and Kerinci ethnic), South Barisan Malay language especially Besemah, Serawai, and Ogan varieties, Musi language especially Lembak/Col variety, and Lampung languages (including Komering). These ethnics writing was gradually replaced by Latin and Jawi script, a localized version of the Arabic script.

== Naming ==
The name Ulu ('upstream') refers to the Barisan Mountains where the rivers in South Sumatra and Bengkulu originate. (Note: "Surat ulu is a local name and a common term for its supporting community to refer to scripts known as rencong or Ka-Ga-Nga by Western scholars. According to Jalil (from the village of Muara Timput) and Meruki (from the village of Ujung Padang), and Pidin (from the village of Napal Jungur), several informants called the Pallava-derived local scripts as Surat Ulu. Westenenk's notes (1922:95), published in TBG edition 61, demonstrate that the Surat Ulu term is a local term used by the community that supports the Ulu writing tradition.") (Note: "Old people in southern Sumatra frequently refer to the Lampung script as the Ulu script...")

The Ulu script is also known as Rencong script (Dutch: Rèntjong-schrift), a term thought to be derived from the Old Malay word mèncong, which means oblique or italics. It could also be derived from the word runcing ('sharp'), as this script family was originally written with a sharp knife tip. Regardless of its origin, Western scholars frequently use this term to refer to this family of scripts. (Note: Regarding the naming relationship between the Rencong script and Surat Ulu, L. C. Westenenk writes as follows: Toen ik dit eerste opstel schreef, wist ik n.l. niet, of de bij Europeanen gebruikelijke term "rèntjong-schrift" inderdaad ergens door Maleisch wordt gebezigd. Het is mij nu gebleken, dat dit in het landschap Rawas (Palembang) het geval is. Elders noemt men het gewonlijk: soerat oeloe = bovenlandsch schrift. — Westenenk (1919) Translation: When I wrote the first essay, I had no idea whether the term "rencong script" used by Europeans was also used by Malay. It has now become clear to me that this is the case in the Rawas (Palembang) landscape. Surat Ulu (upriver scripts) is another name for it.)

Mervyn A. Jaspan (1926–1975), an anthropologist at the University of Hull, called it Kaganga script after the first three consonant letters, ka ga nga. He was probably not aware that most Brahmi script lineages begin their alphabetic order with these. (Note: According to Mohammad Noeh, these scripts are "referred to as the Ka Ga Nga writing, which is an ancient script system originating from India.") This is equivalent to the word "alphabet," which is derived from the names of the first two letters of the Greek alphabet (Α-Β, alpha-beta), and the word "abjad," which is derived from the names of the first four letters of the Arabic alphabet (ا-ب-ج-د, alif-ba-jim-dal).

Several tribes have their own names in addition to the three mentioned above. For example, this script family is known as the surat ʁincung among the Pasemah ethnic group.

== Materials ==
Rencong script was often written on tree bark, bamboo, horns and palmyra-palm leaves.

== Disambiguation ==
The term "Rencong" is often confused with "Rejang", which refers to a specific Rencong alphabet that was used to write various dialects of the Rejang language and for writing Malay in the region.

== Distribution ==
This map below shows the distribution of various Rencong alphabets in South Sumatra:

Map showing distribution of Rencong scripts.

== Galleries ==
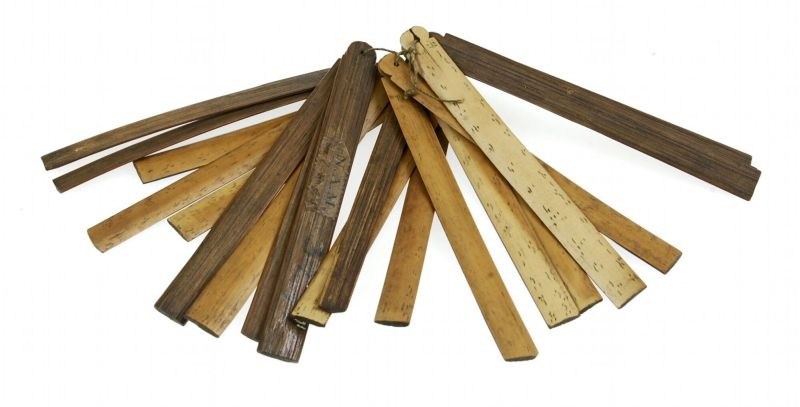
Gelumpai inscribed with the Rejang script

== See also ==
- Rejang alphabet
- Lampung alphabet
- Komering script
