= Sundanese script (disambiguation) =

Sundanese script which is used as standard while writing in Sudanese.

Sundanese script may also refer to:

- Old Sundanese script, which was used 14th–18th century
- Sundanese script, which is standardized sundanese script that derives from Old Sundanese script
- Sundanese-modified Javanese script, also known as cacarakan, which was used from 19th century
