= Old Sundanese language =

Earliest recorded stage of the Sundanese language

Old Sundanese
- Basa Sunda Buhun ᮘᮞ ᮞᮥᮔ᮪ᮓ ᮘᮥᮠᮥᮔ᮪

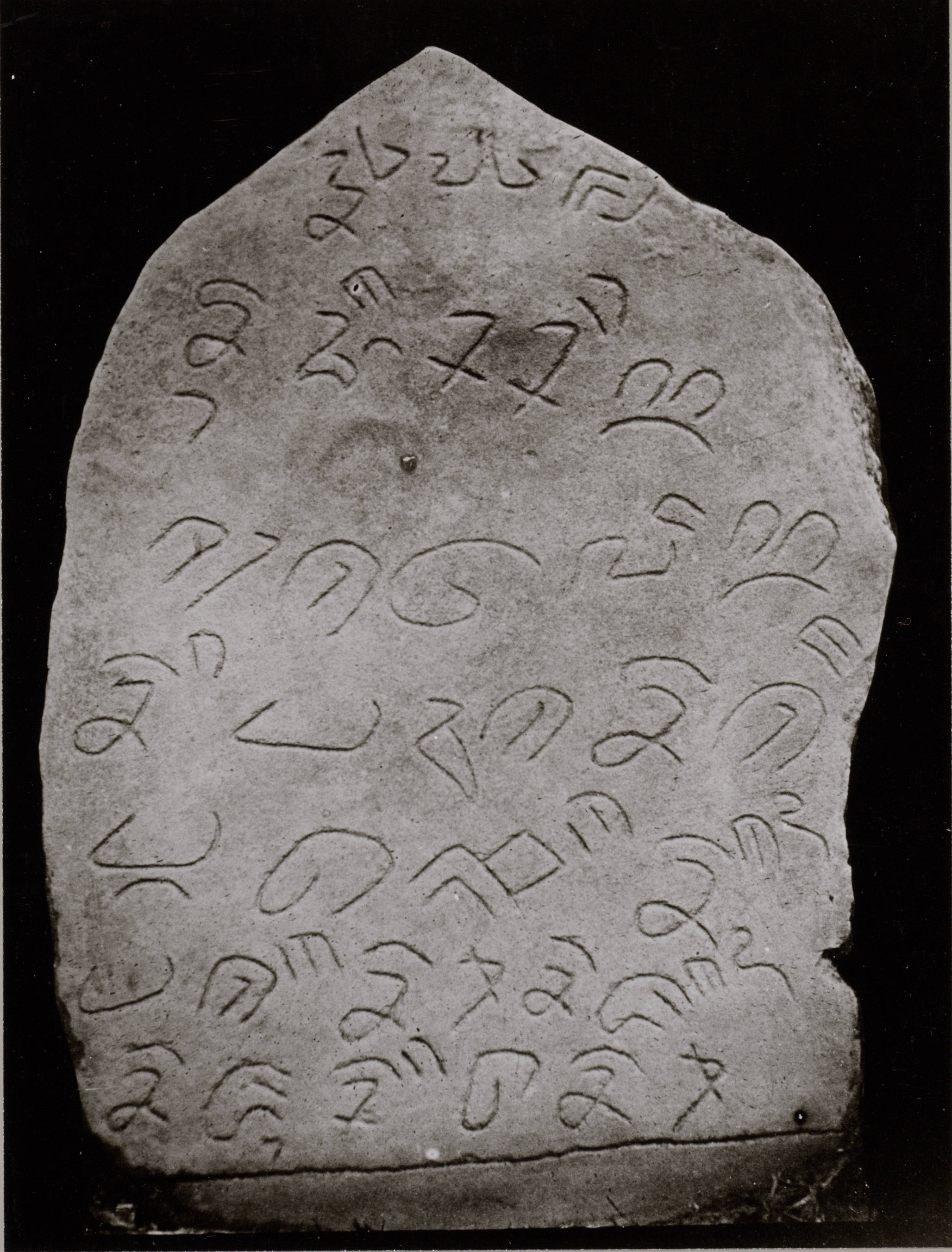
- The inscriptions of Astana Gede, records the old Sundanese language using Old Sundanese script
- Region: Sunda Kingdom
- Era: 12th to 17th centuries; afterwards developed into the Sundanese towards the 18th century.
- Language family: Austronesian: Malayo-Polynesian; Old Sundanese
- Writing system: Buda Script; Old Sundanese script

Language codes
- ISO 639-3: osn
- Glottolog: sund1255
- IETF: osn

Old Sundanese (Sundanese script: ᮘᮞ ᮞᮥᮔ᮪ᮓ ᮘᮥᮠᮥᮔ᮪, Old Sundanese script: , Buda script: , Roman script: Basa Sunda Buhun) is the earliest recorded stage of the Sundanese language which is spoken in the western part of Java, Indonesia. The evidence is recorded in inscriptions from around the 12th to 14th centuries and ancient palm-leaf manuscripts from the 15th to 17th centuries AD. Old Sundanese is no longer used today, but has developed into its descendant, modern Sundanese.

== Written evidence ==
Old Sundanese is recorded in stone inscriptions such as the Kawali inscription in Ciamis, and the Batutulis inscription in Bogor, as well as in inscriptions made from copper plates such as the Kabantenan inscription from the Bekasi Regency. Other remains documenting the use of Old Sundanese are palm-leaf manuscripts from the Bandung, Garut, and Bogor regions. The manuscripts are now stored in several institutions, including Kabuyutan Ciburuy in Bayongbong Garut, Sri Baduga Museum in Bandung, the National Library of Indonesia in Jakarta, and the Bodleian Library in London.

== Characteristics ==
=== Lexicon ===
The vocabulary used in Old Sundanese is still mostly recognizable for speakers of modern Sundanese, either with the same meaning or having undergone a change of meaning. The use of Sanskrit which is adapted to the pronunciation or writing of the ancient Sundanese is mixed quite clearly. This is because of the nuances of the use of ancient Sundanese in Hindu and Buddhist religious texts. In some parts, the same vocabulary is often found, even combined with sentence strings in Old Javanese. In other parts, we also find the use of Old Malay vocabulary and Arabic. The lexicon of Old Sundanese has been collected in an Old Sundanese–Indonesian dictionary.

=== Morphology ===
The morphology of word formation can generally be recognized in modern Sundanese with some exclusions, for example the use of the prefix a- in the word awurung. The suffix -keun has a grammatical function similar to that of -kan in Indonesian. In addition, the use of insertion affixes (infix) -in- and -um- in the word ginawé (word stem gawé;' 'to do') and gumanti (the root word ganti: 'replace') are insertions that are classified as productive used in old Sundanese, now words that include -in- and - um- is often considered monomorphemic. The following words are often not perceived as interpolated words such as sumebar which consists of sebar and -um-, cumeluk which consists of celuk and -um- or tinangtu which consists of tangtu and -in- and pinareng consists of pareng and -in-. The last is the use of insertion -ar- which serves to make a noun or adjective plural, for example in the word karolot (word stem kolot; 'the elders') which is still used until now.

| prefix | gloss |
|---|---|
| a- | abilitative "can do X" |
| di- | form intransitive active verbs with the meaning of "doing things" and passive verbs with the meaning of "done, finished" |
| ka- | forms nouns, passive verbs, and ordinal numbers. Grammatically, it means "something that does X" |
| pa- | forms nouns |
| N- | forms verbs |
| ma(ng)- | forms active verbs |
| pang- | forms nouns with the grammatical meaning of "doing X, relating to X" |
| pi- | forms nouns from verbs |
| sa- | forms words that show totality, alternatively used to express one of something |

| infix | gloss |
|---|---|
| -ar- | plural number |
| -in- | expresses passive voice in verbs |
| -um- | expresses active voice in verbs |

| suffix | gloss |
|---|---|
| -an | forms words with the meaning "tool used for X" |
| -keun | forms words with the meaning of "to make X do Y" |
| -eun | forms nouns from verbs with the resulting meaning of "used for X" |

=== Syntax ===
At the syntactic level, in general the sentence form in ancient Sundanese still has similarities with modern Sundanese. One of the features of ancient Sundanese that can be distinguished from the structure of modern Sundanese is the use of the predicate-subject pattern in the sentence structure of the ancient Sundanese language with predicates in the form of a verb (verb) and a subject in the form of a noun (noun) which is quite consistent. Another characteristic feature is the use of ma particles which can act as reinforcement for previous phrases or clauses. In sentence construction, the particle ma functions as a marker that separates the clauses, and serves to introduce new information.

== Writing system ==
Kawali Old Sundanese script

Carita Ratu Pakuan Old Sundanese script

Buda script

Writing systems that use the Old Sundanese language include Old Sundanese script and Buda script. These two characters can be seen from the inscriptions and ancient manuscripts stored in a place called Kabuyutan. These two characters has different functions. Old Sundanese script usually can be found on the inscriptions describing important events that occurred in the Sundanese region, while the Buda script is widely used to write things that have a high level of sacredness in lontar or gebang manuscripts.

== Example usages ==
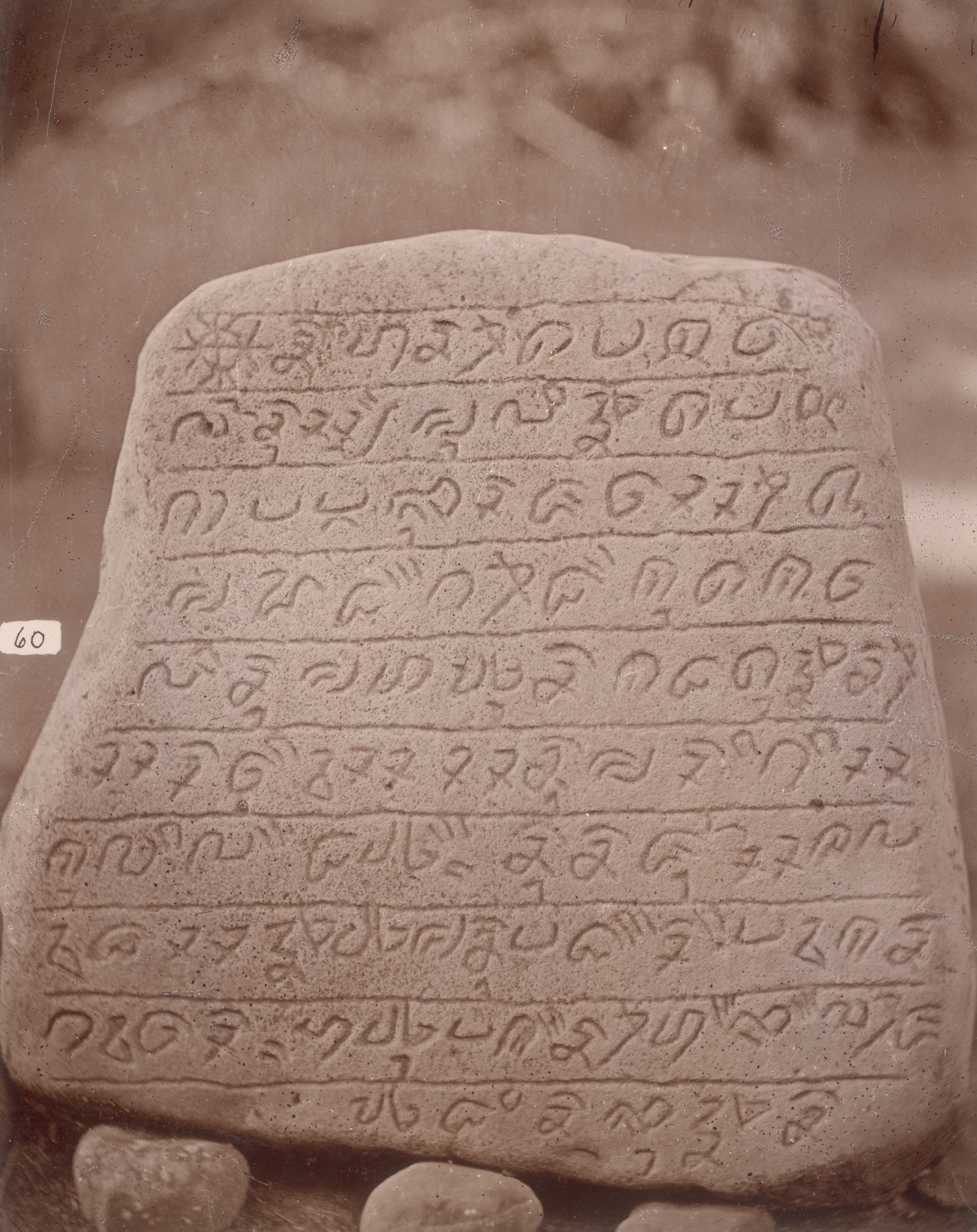
Kawali I inscription in kabuyutan area of Astana Gede, Kawali.

=== Inscription ===
The following is an example of the use of the old Sundanese language recorded in the Kawali inscription. Diplomatic transliteration was done by archaeologists Hasan Jafar & Titi Surti Nastiti.

"nihan tapak walar nu sang hyang mulia tapa(k) inya parĕbu raja wastu mangadĕg di kuta kawali nu mahayu na kadatuan surawisesa nu marigi sakuliling dayĕh najur sakala desa aya ma nu pa(n)deuri pakĕna gawe rahayu pakĕn hĕbĕl jaya dina buana"

Translation:

These are the traces (tapak) (in) Kawali (of) the hometown of His Majesty King Wastu (who) established the defense (reigned in) Kawali, who had beautified the Surawisesa palace, which made a defensive trench around the royal territory, which prospered the whole settlement. To those who are to come, should apply salvation as the foundation of victorious life in the world.

=== Old manuscripts ===
The old Sundanese language used in lontar and gebang manuscripts can be distinguished based on the form of the text, namely poetry and prose.

==== Poetry ====
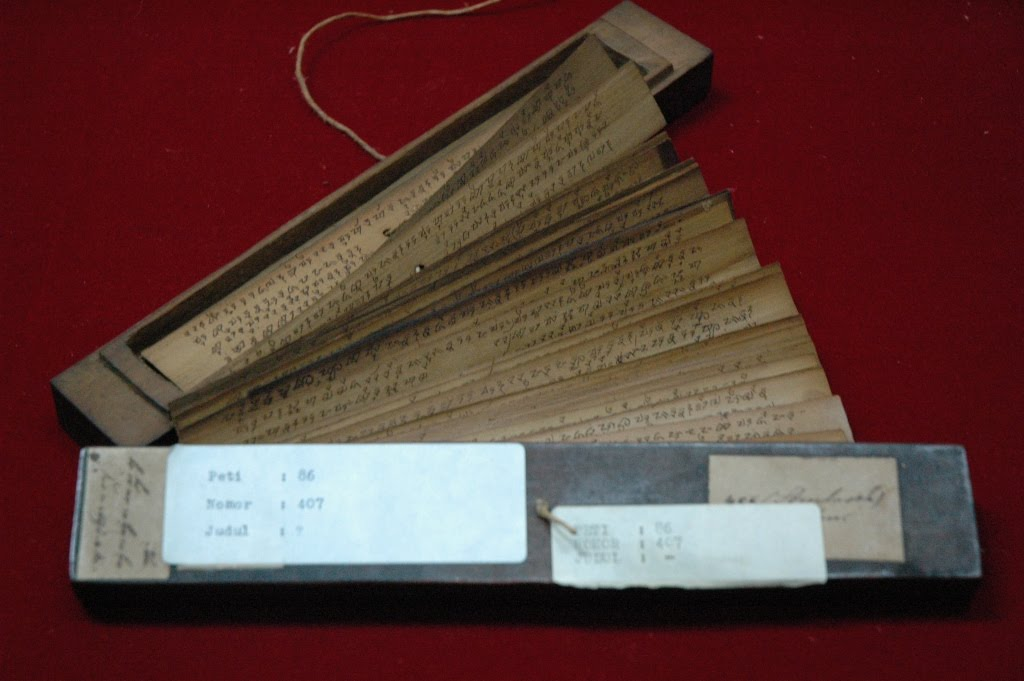
Kawih Pangeuyeukan the National Library of Indonesia collection, contains text in Old Sundanese.

Some of the ancient Sundanese manuscripts that contain texts in the form of poetry include Sewaka Darma, Carita Purnawijaya, Bujangga Manik, Sri Ajnyana, Kawih Pangeuyeukan and Sanghyang Swawarcinta. The old Sundanese language written in the form of poetry texts generally uses an eight syllable pattern, although in some texts this rule is not so strict.

Pendakian Sri Ajnyana Text:
"Sakit geui ngareungeuheun
cicing hanteu dék matingtim,
usma ku raga sarira.
Béngkéng upapen rasana,
dosa a(ng)geus kanyahoan,
ngeureuy teuing gawé hala,
hanteu burung katalayahan,
Ja kini teuing rasana,
Kasasar jadi manusa.
Saurna Sri Ajnyana:
‘Adiing, ambet ka dini.
Mulah ceurik nangtung dinya.
Dini di lahunan aing.
Tuluy dirawu dipangku"

=== Prose ===
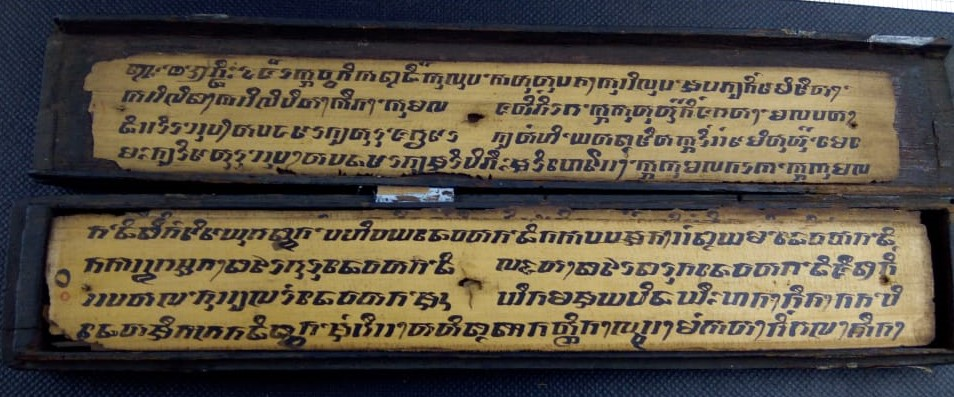
Gebang manuscript in Old Sundanese Sanghyang Raga Dewata, collection of Sribaduga Museum, Bandung.

Texts containing Sundanese in prose include Sanghyang Siksa Kandang Karesian, Amanat Galunggung, Sanghyang Sasana Maha Guru, and Sanghyang Raga Dewata. The following are examples of sentences used in the Amanat Galunggung.

"Awignam astu. Nihan tembey sakakala Rahyang Ba/n/nga, masa sya nyususk na Pakwan makangaran Rahyangta Wuwus, maka manak Maharaja Dewata, Maharaja Dewata maka manak Baduga Sanghyang, Baduga Sanghyang maka manak Prebu Sanghyang, Prebu Sanghyang maka manak Sa(ng) Lumahing rana, Sang Lumahing Rana maka manak Sa(ng) Lumahing Winduraja, Sa(ng) Lumahing Winduraja maka manak Sa(ng) Lumahing Tasikpa(n)jang, Sang Lumahing Tasik pa(n)jang (maka manak) Sa(ng) Lumahing Hujung Kembang, Sa(ng) Lumahing Hujung Kembang maka manak Rakeyan Darmasiksa."
