= List of writing systems of Indonesia =

The writing system used in Indonesia; both historically and currently.

The following is a list of writing systems that are used in Indonesia.

Script	Parent Script Derivation	Type	Script Variant	Status^	ISO 15924	Main Language	Sample
Latin script	Greek (16th century)	Alphabet	-	Active	Latn	Indonesian, all regional languages	Bahasa Indonesia
Ulu script	Kawi-Brahmic (17th century)	Abugida	Ulu/Rencong	Active	-	Malay, Bengkulu, Kerinci, Lampung, Rejang, Serawai, etc.	
Ulu script	Kawi-Brahmic (17th century)	Abugida	Rejang	Active	Rjng	Rejang	
Ulu script	Kawi-Brahmic (17th century)	Abugida	Lembak	Active	-	Lembak	
Ulu script	Kawi-Brahmic (17th century)	Abugida	Lintang	Active	-	Lintang	
Ulu script	Kawi-Brahmic (17th century)	Abugida	Lebong	Active	-	Lebong	
Ulu script	Kawi-Brahmic (17th century)	Abugida	Serawai	Active	-	Serawai	
Ulu script	Kawi-Brahmic (17th century)	Abugida	Pasemah	Active	-	Pasemah	
Ulu script	Kawi-Brahmic (17th century)	Abugida	Lampung	Active	-	Lampung, Komering	
Ulu script	Kawi-Brahmic (17th century)	Abugida	Ogan	Active	-	Ogan	
Ulu script	Kawi-Brahmic (17th century)	Abugida	Incung	Active	-	Kerinci	
Ulu script	Kawi-Brahmic (17th century)	Abugida	Toba Incung	Extinct	-	Batak Toba	
Ulu script	Kawi-Brahmic (17th century)	Abugida	Jangang-Jangang	Extinct	Maka	Makassar	
Batak script	Kawi-Brahmic (14th century)	Abugida	Karo	Active	Batk	Batak Karo	
Batak script	Kawi-Brahmic (14th century)	Abugida	Mandailing	Active	Batk	Batak Angkola, Batak Mandailing	
Batak script	Kawi-Brahmic (14th century)	Abugida	Pakpak	Active	Batk	Batak Pakpak, Batak Dairi	
Batak script	Kawi-Brahmic (14th century)	Abugida	Simalungun	Active	Batk	Batak Simalungun	
Batak script	Kawi-Brahmic (14th century)	Abugida	Toba	Active	Batk	Batak Toba	
Lontara script	Kawi-Brahmic (17th century)	Abugida	Lontara	Active	Bugi	Buginese, Makassar, Mandar, Luwu	
Lontara script	Kawi-Brahmic (17th century)	Abugida	Satera Jontal	Active	-	Sumbawa	
Lontara script	Kawi-Brahmic (17th century)	Abugida	Mbojo	Active	-	Bimanese	
Lontara script	Kawi-Brahmic (17th century)	Abugida	Lota Ende	Active	-	Ende	
Lontara script	Kawi-Brahmic (17th century)	Abugida	Bilang-Bilang	Extinct	-	Buginese	
Lontara script	Kawi-Brahmic (17th century)	Abugida	Bada/Badaic	Extinct	-	Badaic	
Sundanese script	Kawi-Brahmic (20th century)	Abugida	-	Active	Sund	Sundanese	
Javanese script	Kawi-Brahmic (16th century)	Abugida	-	Active	Java	Javanese, Cirebonese, Osing	
Balinese script	Kawi-Brahmic (11th century)	Abugida	Balinese	Active	Bali	Balinese	
Balinese script	Kawi-Brahmic (11th century)	Abugida	Sasak	Active	Bali	Sasak	
Jawi script	Arabic (9th century)	Abjad	Jawi	Active	Arab	Malay,Minangkabau, Banjarese, Ternate, Tidore, etc.	
Jawi script	Arabic (9th century)	Abjad	Acehnese Jawoe	Active	Arab	Acehnese	
Jawi script	Arabic (9th century)	Abjad	Pegon	Active	Arab	Madurese	
Jawi script	Arabic (9th century)	Abjad	Buri Wolio	Active	Arab	Wolio	
Jawi script	Arabic (9th century)	Abjad	Serang	Active	Arab	Buginese, Makassarese	
Cia-Cia	Hangul (21st century)	Featural	-	Active	Hang	Cia-Cia	
Hanzi	Regular	Logogram	Traditional	Foreign	Hani	Chinese	
Hanzi	Regular	Logogram	Simplified	Foreign	Hani	Chinese	
Hanzi	Regular	Logogram	Kanji	Foreign	Hani	Japanese	
Kana	Kanji-Hanzi	Syllabary	Hiragana	Foreign	Hira	Japanese	
Kana	Kanji-Hanzi	Syllabary	Katakana	Foreign	Kana	Japanese	
Arabic	Nabataean-Aramaic	Abjad	Arabic	Foreign	Arab	Arabic	
Arabic	Nabataean-Aramaic	Abjad	Persian	Foreign	Arab	Persian	
Devanagari	Gupta-Brahmic	Abugida	-	Foreign	Deva	Hindi, Sanskrit	
Tamil	Pallava-Brahmic	Abugida	-	Foreign	Taml	Tamil	
Cyrillic	Greek	Alphabet	-	Foreign	Cyrl	Russian, Ukrainian	
Kawi	Pallava-Brahmic (8th century)	Abugida	-	Extinct	Kawi	Old Balinese, Old Javanese, Old Sundanese, Old Malay, Sanskrit, etc.	
Buda/Gunung	Kawi-Brahmic (14th century)	Abugida	-	Extinct	-	Old Javanese, Old Sundanese	
Old Sundanese	Kawi-Brahmic (14th century)	Abugida	-	Extinct	-	Sundanese	
Kaganga	Kawi-Brahmic (17th century)	Abugida	-	Extinct	-	Rejang	
Iban/Dunging	Unknown (20th century)	Semisyllabary	-	Controversial	-	Iban	
Malesung	Unknown	Unknown	-	Controversial	-	Minahasan	
Nggahi Mbojo	Unknown	Unknown	-	Controversial	-	Bimanese	
Minang/Tamboalam	Unknown	Unknown	-	Controversial	-	Minangkabau	
Mongondow/Basahan	Unknown	Unknown	-	Controversial	-	Mongondow	
Suwawa	Unknown	Alphabet	-	Controversial	-	Suwawa	
Tidung	Unknown	Unknown	-	Controversial	-	Tidung	
Mentawai	Unknown	Unknown	-	Controversial	-	Mentawai	
Gayo	Unknown	Unknown	-	Controversial	-	Gayo	
Palembang	Unknown	Unknown	-	Controversial	-	Palembang	
Kanung	Unknown	Unknown	-	Controversial	-	Unknown	
Sangir	Unknown	Unknown	-	Controversial	-	Sangir	
Cirebon	Unknown	Unknown	-	Controversial	-	Cirebonese	
Alifuru	Unknown	Alphabet	-	Controversial	-	Bahasa tanah (Moluccan languages)	

^Status:

Active: writing systems that are still in use, managed, and actively taught in schools in Indonesia.

Foreign: writing systems that are not managed by the government of Indonesia, mainly used by the descendants of the respective ethnicities or by foreigners residing in Indonesia.

Extinct: writing systems that are extinct, no longer used regularly, or only used in special occasions, like, funeral (tombstone), poetry, rituals, etc.

Controversial: writing systems that are controversial, require more research, or are debated as to whether they were ever used historically.
