= Van Ophuijsen Spelling System =

Historical Indonesian spelling system

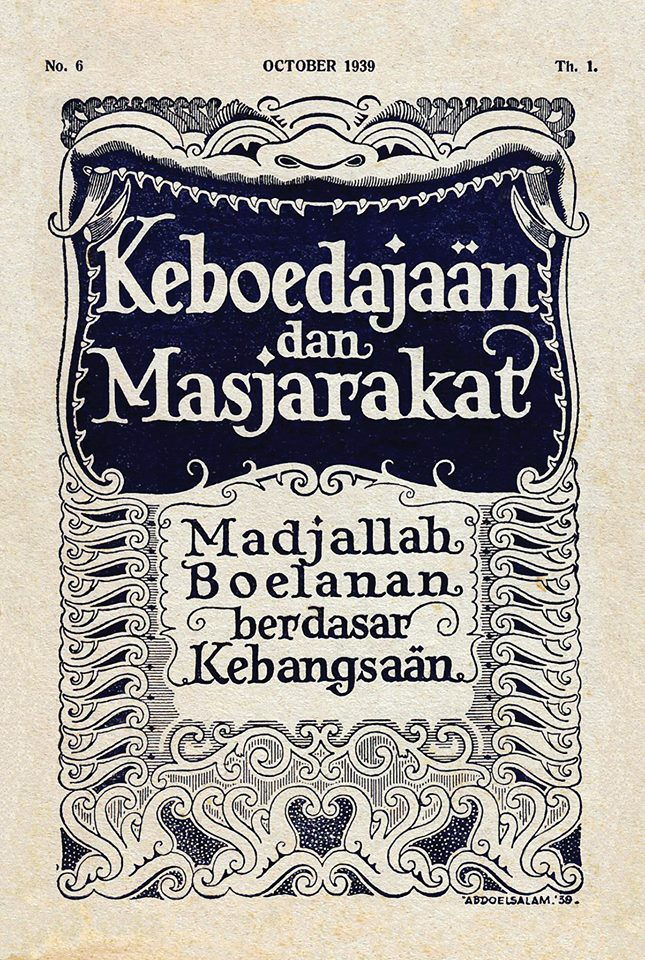
Keboedajaän dan Masjarakat. Madjallah Boelanan berdasar Kebangsaän (1939) ("Culture and Society. Monthly Magazines by Nationality") uses the Van Ophuijsen Spelling System which shows tréma signs. In modern Indonesian spelling, the title would be Kebudayaan dan Masyarakat. Majalah Bulanan berdasar Kebangsaan.

The Van Ophuijsen Spelling System (Indonesian: Ejaan Van Ophuijsen, EVO) was the Romanized standard orthography for the Malay dialects across the Dutch East Indies (now Indonesia) that would form the basis for the Indonesian language, from 1901 to 1947. Before the Van Ophuijsen Spelling System was in force, these variants of Malay in the Dutch East Indies did not have a standardized spelling, or was written in the Jawi script. In 1947, the Van Ophuijsen Spelling System was replaced by the Republican Spelling System.

== History ==
Prof. Charles Adriaan van Ophuijsen, who devised the orthography, was a Dutch linguist. He was a former inspector in a school at Bukittinggi, West Sumatra in the 1890s, before he became a professor of the Malay language at Leiden University in the Netherlands. Together with two native assistants, Engku Nawawi and Mohammed Taib Sultan Ibrahim, he published the new orthography on Kitab Logat Malajoe: Woordenlijst voor Spelling der Maleische Taal in 1901, and published a second book, Maleische Spraakkunst, in 1910. The latter was translated by T.W. Kamil into Tata Bahasa Melayu in 1983 and became the primary guide for the spelling and usage of the Malay language in Indonesia.

== Characteristics ==
The Van Ophuijsen system was modeled extensively on Dutch orthography, ostensibly to make pronunciation of Malay and Indonesian words more easily understandable to Dutch colonial authorities. Thus, the system used the Dutch variant of the Latin script, reflecting contemporaneous Dutch phonology. Some noticeable characteristics of this spelling system were:

- The digraph ⟨dj⟩ was used to write "j" [dʒ], for example djari (jari).
- The digraph ⟨tj⟩ was used to write "c" [tʃ], for example tjoetji (cuci).
- The letter ⟨j⟩ was used to write "y" [j], for example jang, pajah and sajang (yang, payah, and sayang).
- The digraph ⟨nj⟩ was used to write "ny" [ɲ], for example njamoek (nyamuk).
- The digraph ⟨sj⟩ was used to write "sy" [ʃ], for example sjarat (syarat).
- The digraph ⟨ch⟩ was used to write "kh" [x], for example achir (akhir).
- The digraph ⟨oe⟩ was used to write "u" [u], for example goeroe, itoe and oemoer (guru, itu, and umur).
- An apostrophe was used to write the glottal stop [ʔ], for example ma'moer, 'akal, ta' and pa'.
- A diaeresis, for example ⟨ä⟩, ⟨ë⟩, ⟨ï⟩, and ⟨ö⟩, was used to indicate that a vowel was pronounced as a full syllable and not as a diphthong (⟨ai⟩ [ai̯], ⟨au⟩ [au̯] and ⟨oi⟩ [oi̯]), for example dinamaï (pronounced as [dinamai], not [dinamai̯]).
- The letter ⟨é⟩ with an acute was used to write [ɛ], while plain ⟨e⟩ indicated [ə], for example énak vs. beli. This character retains some use in pedagogical writing, as in dictionaries and learner materials, to distinguish [ɛ] and [ə], though in the modern Republican Spelling System, both are normally written ⟨e⟩.

== Limitations ==
While the Van Ophuijsen system greatly aided Dutch speakers in pronouncing the Indonesian language, its complete reliance on Dutch orthography, which is rich in digraphs and trigraphs, often resulted in unwieldy spellings of Indonesian words. For example:

- The digraph ⟨oe⟩ for [u] resulted in a conspicuous absence of the letter ⟨u⟩ in contemporary Indonesian texts, as ⟨u⟩ in Dutch orthography represents [ʏ] or [y] — sounds which do not exist in Indonesian. This produced awkward spellings, sometimes with three vowel graphemes occurring in a row, e.g. koeat and djaoeh; modern spelling kuat and jauh ("strong" and "far").
- The digraphs ⟨dj⟩ and ⟨tj⟩ for [dʒ] and [tʃ] were used to represent single sounds in Indonesian, and would eventually be simplified to ⟨j⟩ and ⟨c⟩ in modern Indonesian orthography. Both ⟨nj⟩ [ɲ] and ⟨sj⟩ [ʃ] have been retained as digraphs, but changed to ⟨ny⟩ and ⟨sy⟩.
- The diaeresis was often redundant, especially when indicating glottal stops in between two identical consecutive vowels, e.g. keboedajaän. The Dutch language regularly employs ⟨aa⟩, ⟨ee⟩, ⟨oo⟩ and ⟨uu⟩ to represent long vowels, and uses diaereses to signify separate sounds in vowel clusters, e.g. tweeëntwintig ("twenty-two"). However, there is no short/long vowel distinction in Indonesian. As such, it was not necessary to include a diaeresis in words such as keboedajaän, kebanggaän, keënakan and so on; the doubled vowels already signal that they are voiced separately, without the need for a diaeresis.

The perceived shortcomings of the Van Ophuijsen system led to the development of a partially revised orthography called the Republican Spelling System in 1947, and eventually to the adoption of the Enhanced Indonesian Spelling System in 1972.

== Names ==
Van Ophuijsen spellings continue to be frequently used in Indonesian names like Soerjadjaja (Suryajaya, also written in a mixed spelling as Soeryadjaya). Since spelling of Indonesian names are fluid, usage can also be inconsistent: for example, Sukarno wrote his own name with a u, but signed it as Soekarno.

== See also ==
- Enhanced Indonesian Spelling System
- Republican Spelling System
