= Republican Spelling System =

Obsolete Indonesian spelling system

The Republican Spelling System (in Indonesian: ejaan Republik, when written in the current spelling system, or edjaan Republik, when written in this spelling system) or Soewandi Spelling (in Indonesian: ejaan Suwandi, when written in the current spelling system, or edjaan Suwandi, when written in this spelling system) was the orthography used for Indonesian from 19 March 1947 until 17 August 1972. It was named after the Indonesian Minister of Learning at the time, Soewandi.

== History ==
This spelling replaced the earlier spelling system, the Van Ophuijsen Spelling System, which was in force from 1901. While it simplified the van Ophuijsen system somewhat (notably with the introduction of the letter u and the removal of diacritics), it retained other aspects of the old system, such as the Dutch-influenced digraphs ch, dj and tj.

The Soewandi spelling was exposed to continuous criticism from the literate community in the early fifties. The 'literate community' is not to be taken in its widest sense; those who engaged themselves in this question were particularly teachers, not unexpectedly. These shortcomings were of two kinds: partly the lack of consistent norms, particularly in the spelling of foreign and semi-naturalized words, and partly the lack of distinction between certain phonemes, which made the teaching of a correct pronunciation more difficult than it needed to be.

The Republican Spelling System was in force from 1947 until 1972, when it was replaced by the Enhanced Spelling System (Ejaan yang Disempurnakan, EYD) when Mashuri Saleh became Minister of Education and Culture. On 23 May 1972, Mashuri legalized the usage of the EYD, replacing the Republican system. This event was marked by changing the road sign at the front of his office from Djl Tjilatjap to Jl. Cilacap (Cilacap street).

== Characteristics ==
The differences between the Van Ophuijsen Spelling System and this system are:

- The vowel [u], which in the Van Ophuijsen Spelling System was written as ⟨oe⟩, became ⟨u⟩, for example goeroe became guru.
- The sign ⟨'⟩ or ⟨ʼ⟩ for the glottal stop (hamzah) [ʔ] and ⟨ʻ⟩ for the Arabic y ⟨ع⟩ were to be abolished in syllable-initial position and replaced by ⟨k⟩ in syllable-final position, such as tak (formerly ta'), pak (formerly pa'), maklum (formerly ma'lum) and rakjat (formerly ra'jat).
- The reduplicated words could be written using the numeral 2, for example ubur2, ber-main2 and ke-barat2-an.
- Both the prefix di- and the preposition di were written without a space after the preposition or prefix. Thus, the preposition di (for example dirumah and disawah) was not differentiated from the prefix di- (for example dibeli and dimakan).
- The difference between the phonemes plain ⟨e⟩ indicated [ə] and ⟨é⟩ with an acute was used to write [ɛ] was abolished: both were to be written ⟨e⟩.
- The difference between diphthongs and the vowel sequences (which was indicated by presence of diaeresis) was to be abolished. Both were to be written without diaeresis.

== Comparison ==
IPA	Van Ophuijsen	Republican Soewandi	Ejaan yang Disempurnakan
[tʃ]	tj	tj	c
[dʒ]	dj	dj	j
[j]	j	j	y
[ɲ]	nj	nj	ny
[ʃ]	sj	sj	sy
[x]	ch	ch	kh
[u]	oe	u	u

== See also ==
- Van Ophuijsen Spelling System
- Enhanced Indonesian Spelling System
