= Alifuru script =

Writing system in the Maluku Islands

Alifuru script Aksara Alifuru
- Script type: Alphabet
- Period: Unknown
- Languages: Bahasa tanah

Alifuru script is a writing system originating from the Maluku region in Indonesia. The letters in this script are derived from traditional symbols used in the culture of the Alifuru people, and are primarily used to write bahasa tanah — a ceremonial language spoken exclusively during traditional rituals.

== History ==
Historically, the Alifuru people did not develop a formal writing system and relied instead on oral tradition and folklore for cultural transmission. The symbols found in the Alifuru script closely resemble traditional iconography used by the community. However, adapting these symbols into a structured writing system is a relatively recent innovation and lacks clear historical precedent (Pattiiha, 2018).

From a practical standpoint, the Alifuru script is often regarded as inefficient and cumbersome for regular communication. This stands in contrast to the general principles underlying the development of writing systems, which typically prioritize utility and clarity.

== See also ==
- Bahasa tanah
- Alifuru people
- List of writing systems of Indonesia
