= Old Sundanese script =

Writing system used for the Sudanese language

Old Sundanese script ᮃᮊ᮪ᮞᮛ ᮞᮥᮔ᮪ᮓ ᮊᮥᮔ Aksara Sunda Buhun
- Script type: Abugida
- Period: c. 14th–18th centuries
- Direction: Left-to-right
- Languages: Old Sundanese language Cirebonese language

Related scripts
- Parent systems: Proto-Sinaitic alphabet: Phoenician alphabet; Aramaic alphabet; Brāhmī; Pallava; Old Kawi; Old Sundanese script
- Child systems: Standard Sundanese script
- Sister systems: Balinese; Batak; Baybayin scripts Javanese; Lontara; Lampung; Makasar; Rencong; Rejang

ISO 15924
- ISO 15924: Sund (362), Sundanese

Unicode
- Unicode alias: Sundanese

Old Sundanese script (Sundanese: ᮃᮊ᮪ᮞᮛ ᮞᮥᮔ᮪ᮓ ᮘᮥᮠᮥᮔ᮪, romanized: Aksara Sunda Buhun) is a script that developed in West Java in the 14th–18th centuries which was originally used to write Old Sundanese language. The Old Sundanese script is a development of the Pallava script which has reached the stage of modifying its distinctive form as used in lontar texts in the 16th century.

== History ==
Consonant table in old Sundanese script (CRP's model), from ka to ha

The use of Old Sundanese script in its earliest form is found in the inscriptions found in Astana Gede, Kawali District, Ciamis Regency, and the Kebantenan Inscription in Jatiasih District, Bekasi City.

According to Edi S. Ekajati, the existence of the Old Sundanese script had been gradually displaced due to the expansion of the Mataram Sultanate into the Priangan region, except for Cirebon and Banten. At that time the Sundanese conquerors made Javanese culture their role model and ideal type. As a result, Sundanese culture was displaced by Javanese culture. In fact, many Sundanese writers and cultural observers use Javanese writings and icons.

Old Sundanese script is generally found in manuscripts made from palm leaves whose writing is scratched with a knife. Manuscripts written using this script include Bujangga Manik, Sewaka Darma, Carita Ratu Pakuan, Carita Parahyangan, Carita Parahyangan Fragment, and Carita Waruga Guru. Old Sundanese script is found in columns 89 – 92 in Table van Oud en Nieuw Indische Alphabetten (Holle, 1882).

During its development, Old Sundanese Script did not retain letters from Kawi script which were not used in Old Sundanese language. The letters of the Kawi Script that are extinct in the Old Sundanese Script are:

1. Consonants; includes the letters kha, gha, cha, jha, ṭa (cerebral), ṭha (cerebral), ḍa (cerebral), ḍha (cerebral), ṇa (cerebral), tha, dha, pha, bha, ṣa (cerebral), and śa (palatal).
2. Vowel; includes the letters ā (a long), ī (long i), ū (long u), ṝ (ṛ long), and ḹ (ḷ long). Most of the manuscripts and inscriptions do not distinguish letters and diacritical signs between the sound ӗ (e pepet) and ӧ (long e pepet), however some texts distinguish letters and diacritic marks between the sounds ӗ and ӧ.

== Old Sundanese and Standard Sundanese ==
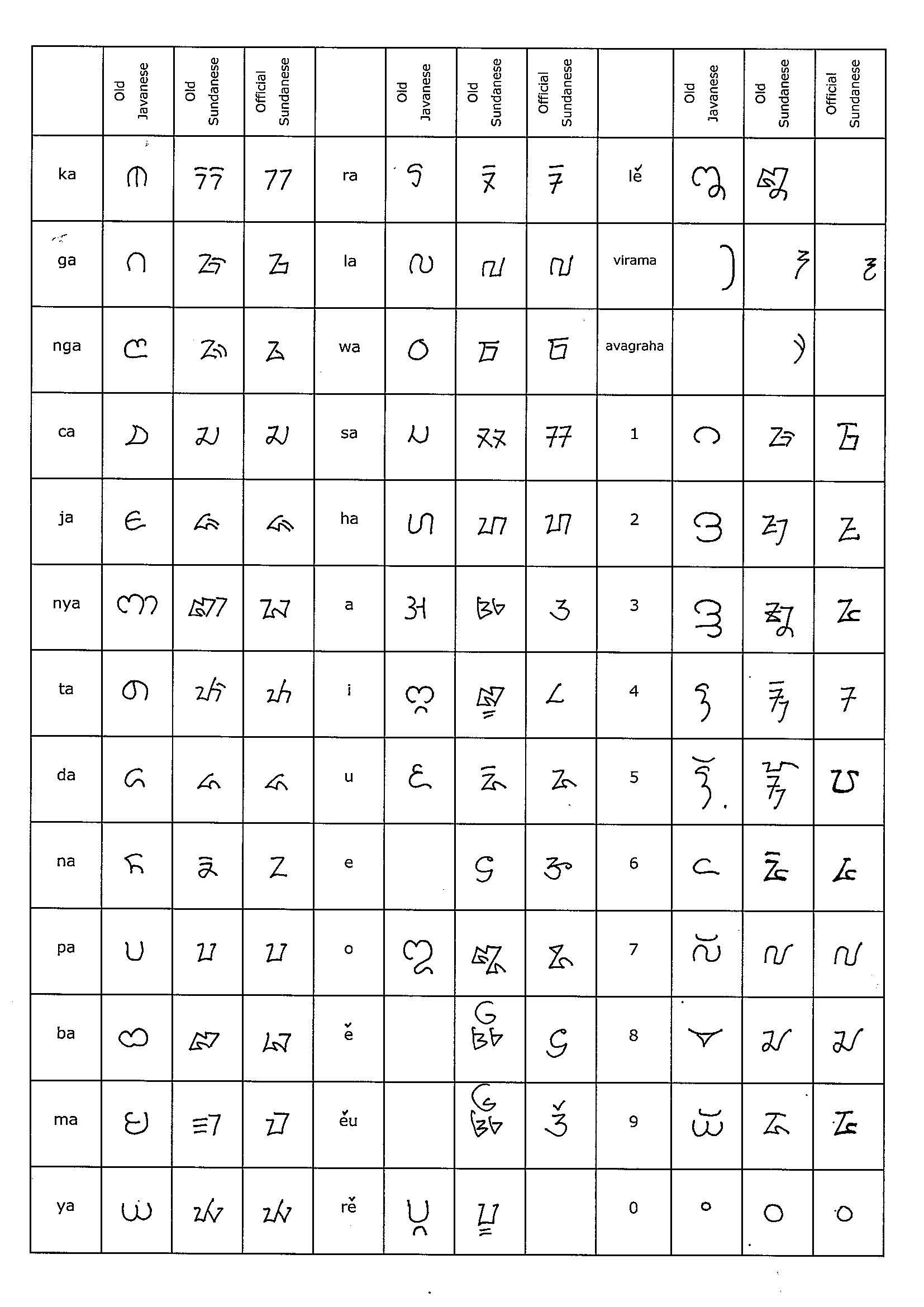
Comparison of letter forms between Old Javanese Script, Old Sundanese Script and Standard Sundanese Script. The Old Javanese script contained is a variant from the Hindu Mataram era.

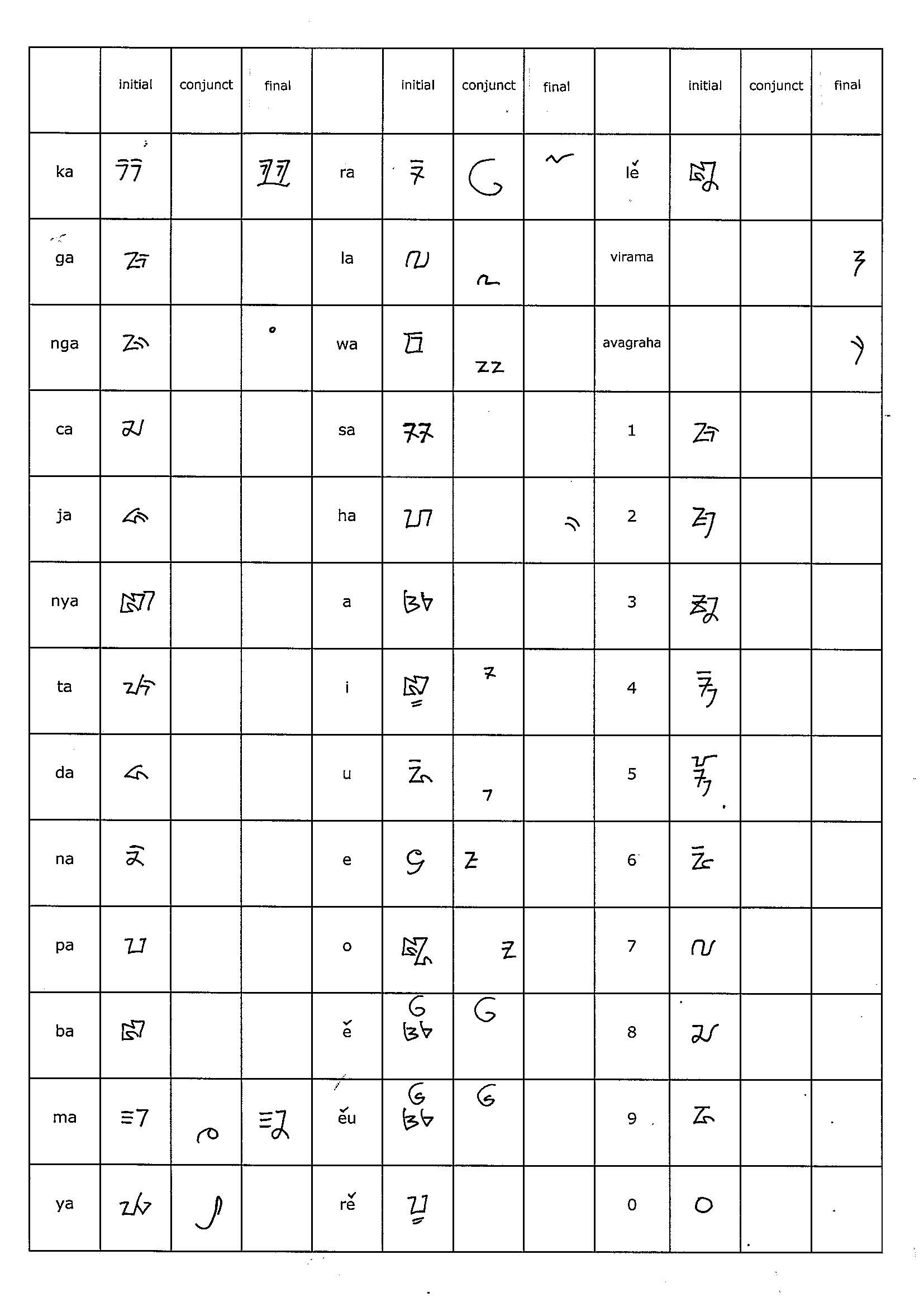
Old Sundanese script as used in palm leaf manuscripts from the 15th–17th centuries.

In the early 2000s, the people of West Java generally only recognized one type of script from the area of West Java which was known as Sundanese script. However, there are at least four types of characters bearing the name Sundanese script, namely Old Sundanese Script, Sundanese Cacarakan script, Pegon Sundanese script, and Standard/Modern Sundanese Script. Of these four types of Sundanese script, Old Sundanese script and Standard Sundanese script can be called similar but not the same. The Standard Sundanese script is a modification of the Old Sundanese script which has been adapted in such a way that it can be used to write contemporary Sundanese. These modifications include adding letters (for example, the letters va and fa), reducing letters (for example, the letters re pepet and le pepet), and changing the shape of the letters (for example, the letters na and ma)

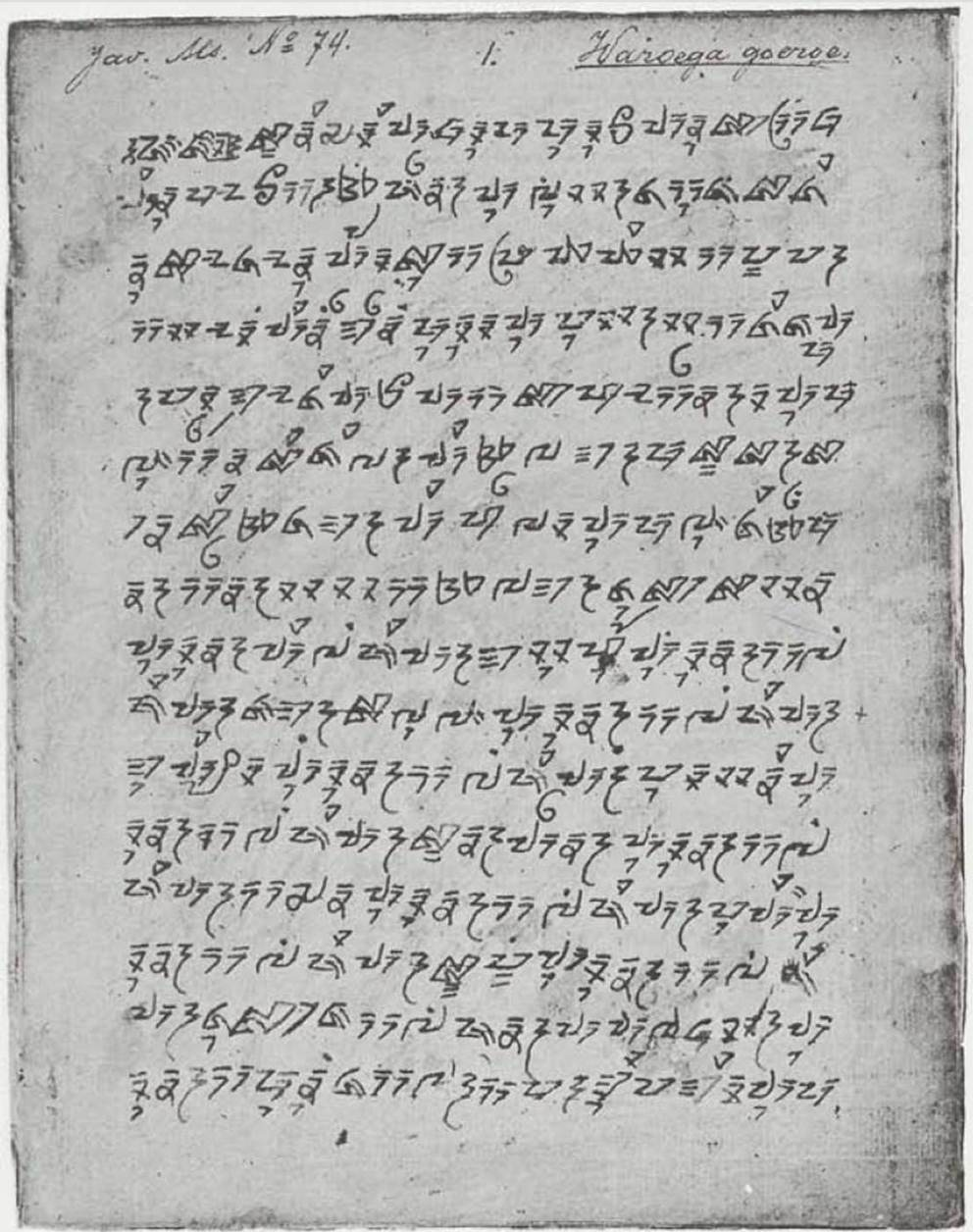
Facsimile of the first page of the Carita Waruga Guru manuscript found in Galuh District.

However, there are now at least two types of Old Sundanese script models that are well documented so that they can be digitized and made into fonts. The two models are the Carita Ratu Pakuan's Model and Kawali's Model.

== Carita Ratu Pakuan's (CRP) Model ==
CRP Sundanese script (Aksara Sunda CRP) ᮃᮊ᮪ᮞᮛ ᮞᮥᮔ᮪ᮓ ᮎ᮪ᮛ᮪ᮕ᮪
- Script type: Abugida
- Period: c. 18th centuries
- Direction: Left-to-right
- Languages: Old Sundanese language

Related scripts
- Parent systems: Proto-Sinaitic alphabet: Phoenician alphabet; Aramaic alphabet; Brāhmī; Pallava; Old Kawi; CRP Sundanese script (Aksara Sunda CRP)

This type of script is found in one of the ancient Sundanese manuscripts entitled: Carita Ratu Pakuan. It is often used as a representation for the whole Old Sundanese script.

The Carita Ratu Pakuan manuscript comes from kropak 410 at the National Library of Indonesia (PNRI) which is now in the Sri Baduga Museum Bandung. This manuscript was written by "Kai Raga".

We can read Kai Raga's profile from Ratu Pakuan (1970) by Atja and Three Enchantments of Old Sundanese (2009) composed of J. Noorduyn and A. Teeuw. Based on the two books, Kai Raga is a hermit who lives around Sutanangtung, Mount Larang Srimanganti. This mountain is the ancient name of Mount Cikuray, Garut, today.

Through Pleyte's search and interpretation of Ratu Pakuan and the Three Enchantments of Old Sundanese, Kai Raga is thought to have lived in the early 18th century. Pleyte's search and interpretation is based on comparisons of the manuscripts he wrote with the Carita Waruga Guru manuscript which shows the similarity of the characters.

Kai Raga's writings and collections were passed down to his relatives. He himself did not leave any offspring. And, when Raden Saleh in 1856 searched for ancient relics at the initiative of the Batavian Society of Arts and Sciences (BGKW), Kai Raga's legacy manuscripts were handed over to the painter.

Carita Ratu Pakuan, as noted by Atja (1970), is divided into two parts. First, regarding the hermitages of the pohaci who will incarnate the daughters of the official candidates for the wife of Ratu Pakuan or Prabu Siliwangi. Second, regarding the story of Putri Ngambetkasih as the wife of Ratu Pakuan.

Apart from the Carita Ratu Pakuan Manuscript, other manuscripts that use a similar script are usually written on manuscripts that use palm leaf media, including: Kawih Panyaraman manuscript, Pakeling manuscript etc. Apart from being written on palm leaf media, similar characters were also written on bamboo media, including: Sanghyang Jati Maha Pitutur manuscript and Carita Waruga Guru manuscript.

Below is a table image containing the letters in the Carita Ratu Pakuan's Model script:

== Kawali's Model ==
Kawali Sundanese script (Aksara Sunda Kawali) ᮃᮊ᮪ᮞᮛ ᮞᮥᮔ᮪ᮓ ᮊᮝᮜᮤ
- Script type: Abugida
- Period: c. 14th centuries
- Direction: Left-to-right
- Languages: Old Sundanese language

Related scripts
- Parent systems: Proto-Sinaitic alphabet: Phoenician alphabet; Aramaic alphabet; Brāhmī; Pallava; Old Kawi; Kawali Sundanese script (Aksara Sunda Kawali)

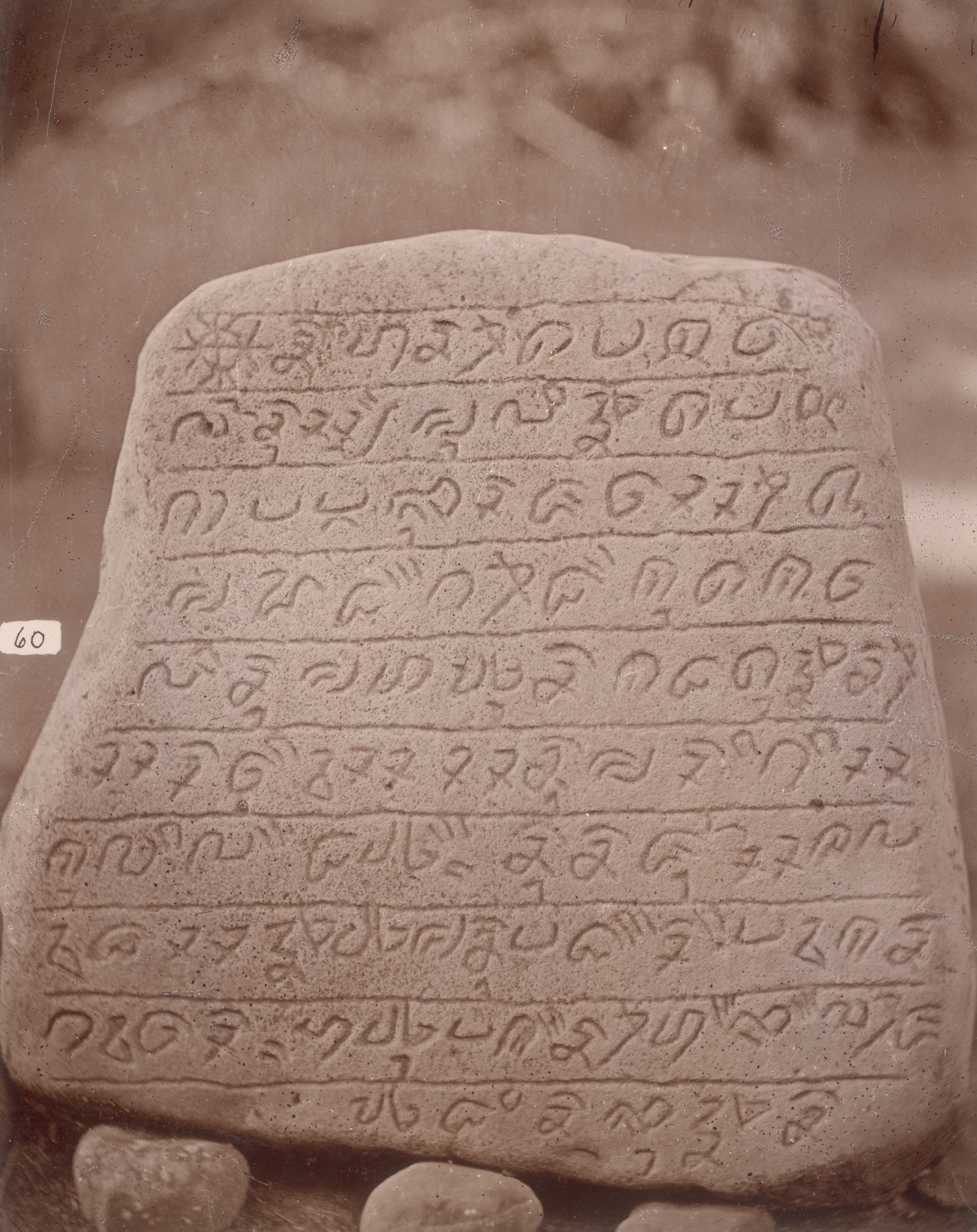
Kawali Inscription in kabuyutan area of Astana Gede, Kawali.

Some of the characters in the Old Sundanese script in the Kawali inscription have a slightly different form from the type of script in the ancient Sundanese manuscripts. It has been stated earlier that the Sundanese script in the Kawali inscription is the oldest type of Sundanese script ever found.

As for in total, there are six inscriptions. All of these inscriptions use Old Sundanese language. Although it does not contain a candrasangkala, it is thought to be from the second half of the 14th century by the name of the king.

Based on comparisons with other historical relics such as the Carita Parahyangan manuscript and Pustaka Rajya Rajya i Bhumi Nusantara, it can be concluded that the Kawali I Inscription is a sakakala or a memorial monument to commemorate the triumph of King Niskala Wastu Kancana, the Sundanese ruler who reigned in Kawali, the son of King Linggabuana who died. in Bubat.

Below is a table image containing the letters in the Kawali Model's script:

== See also ==
- Sundanese script
