= Sunde =

Sunde may refer to:

== Places ==
- Sunde, Holsnøy, Hordaland, a sound in Alver municipality in Vestland county, Norway
- Sunde, Kvinnherad, a village in Kvinnherad municipality in Vestland county, Norway
- Sunde, Matre, a village in Kvinnherad municipality in Vestland county, Norway
- Sunde, Stavanger, a neighborhood in the city of Stavanger in Rogaland county, Norway
- Sunde, Sunnfjord, a village in Sunnfjord municipality in Vestland county, Norway
- Sunde, Telemark, a village in Midt-Telemark municipality in Telemark county, Norway
- Sunde, Trøndelag, a village in Hitra municipality in Trøndelag county, Norway

== People ==
- Arne Sunde (1883–1972), a Norwegian politician, Olympic shooter and army officer
- Arnulf Sunde (born 1951), a former speed skater from Norway, who represented his native country at the 1976 Winter Olympics
- Asbjørn Sunde (1909–1985), a Norwegian politician for the Communist Party of Norway
- Elias Sunde (1851–1910), a Norwegian politician
- Fern Blodgett Sunde (1918–1991), Canadian wireless radio operator
- Harald Sunde (disambiguation), a list of people named Harald Sunde
- Helge Sunde (born 1965), a Norwegian composer and musician (trombone and multi-instrumentalist)
- Hjalmar Inge Sunde (born 1937), a Norwegian military officer and former county governor
- Milt Sunde (1942–2020), a guard who played for the Minnesota Vikings in the National Football League
- Olaf Sunde (1915–1981), a Norwegian lawyer and workers' rights activist
- Olav Sunde (1903–1985), a javelin thrower from Oslo, Norway
- Ole Robert Sunde (born 1952), a Norwegian poet, novelist and essayist
- Paul Tjøstolsen Sunde (1896–1958), a Norwegian politician for the Labour Party
- Per Martin Sunde (born 1944), a Norwegian alpine skier
- Peter Sunde (born 1978), a politician, computer expert, and spokesperson with Norwegian and Finnish ancestry
- Sarah Cameron Sunde, an American theatrical director and translator based in New York City
- Siri Sunde (born 1958), a Norwegian priest
- Torbjørn Sunde (born 1954), a Norwegian jazz musician (trombone)
- Åslaug Linge Sunde (1917–2006), a Norwegian politician for the Liberal Party
- Øystein Sunde (born 1947), a Norwegian folk singer and guitarist

== Other ==
- O. N. Sunde, a Norwegian holding company

== See also ==
- Sund (disambiguation)
- Sünde
- Sunda (disambiguation)
