= Sundanese =

Sundanese may refer to:

- Sundanese people
- Sundanese language
- Sundanese calendar
- Sundanese script
- Sundanese (Unicode block)

== See also ==
- Sunda (disambiguation)
