= Sund =

Sund may refer to:

== Places ==
In northern Europe, there are more than a hundred straits named Sund, see: Sound (geography).

- Sund, Åland, a municipality in Finland
- Sund, Flakstad, a village in Flakstad municipality, Nordland county, Norway
- Sund, Hemnes, a village in Hemnes municipality, Nordland county, Norway
- Sund, Faroe Islands, a town in the Faroe Islands
- Sund, Trosa, a village in Trosa Municipality, Sweden
- Sund, Ydre, a hamlet in Ydre Municipality, Sweden
- Sund Municipality, a former municipality in the old Hordaland county, Norway
- Øresund, a strait between the Baltic Sea and the North Sea
- Sunds, Denmark

== People ==
- Al Sund (1902–1951), American boxer
- Lenny Sund (1904–1972), American boxer
- Steven Sund, former chief of the United States Capitol Police

== Other uses ==
- Sudden unexplained nocturnal death, a type of Sudden arrhythmic death syndrome
- Sundanese script (ISO 15924 code)
