= Tha (Indic) =

Letter "Tha" in Indic scripts

Example glyphs
- Bengali–Assamese: Tha
- Tibetan: Tha
- Thai: ถ
- Malayalam: ഥ
- Sinhala: ථ
- Ashoka Brahmi: Tha
- Devanagari: Tha

Cognates
- Greek: Θ

Properties
- Phonemic representation: /tʰ/
- IAST transliteration: th Th
- ISCII code point: C3 (195)

Tha is a consonant of Indic abugidas. In modern Indic scripts, tha is derived from the early "Ashoka" Brahmi letter after having gone through the Gupta letter. The Brahmi and Kharoṣṭhī forms of the letter are probably derived from the Aramaic Teth, and are thus related to the modern Greek Theta.

== Āryabhaṭa numeration ==
Aryabhata used Devanagari letters for numbers, very similar to the Greek numerals, even after the invention of Indian numerals. The values of the different forms of थ are:

- थ [tʰə] = 17 (१७)
- थि [tʰɪ] = 1,700 (१ ७००)
- थु [tʰʊ] = 170,000 ( ० ०००)
- थृ [tʰri] = 17,000,000 (१ ७० ०० ०००)
- थॢ [tʰlə] = 17×10^{8} (१७×१०^{८})
- थे [tʰe] = 17×10^{10} (१७×१०^{१०})
- थै [tʰɛː] = 17×10^{12} (१७×१०^{१२})
- थो [tʰoː] = 17×10^{14} (१७×१०^{१४})
- थौ [tʰɔː] = 17×10^{16} (१७×१०^{१६})

== Historic Tha ==
There are three different general early historic scripts - Brahmi and its variants, Kharoṣṭhī, and Tocharian, the so-called slanting Brahmi. Tha as found in standard Brahmi, was a simple geometric shape, with variations toward more flowing forms by the Gupta. The Tocharian Tha did not have an alternate Fremdzeichen form. The third form of tha, in Kharoshthi was probably derived from Aramaic separately from the Brahmi letter.

=== Brahmi Tha ===
The Brahmi letter, Tha, is probably derived from the Aramaic Teth, and is thus related to the modern Greek Theta. Several identifiable styles of writing the Brahmi Tha can be found, most associated with a specific set of inscriptions from an artifact or diverse records from an historic period. As the earliest and most geometric style of Brahmi, the letters found on the Edicts of Ashoka and other records from around that time are normally the reference form for Brahmi letters, with vowel marks not attested until later forms of Brahmi back-formed to match the geometric writing style.

Brahmi Tha historic forms
Ashoka (3rd-1st c. BCE)	Girnar (~150 BCE)	Kushana (~150-250 CE)	Gujarat (~250 CE)	Gupta (~350 CE)

=== Tocharian Tha ===
The Tocharian letter is derived from the Brahmi, but does not have an alternate Fremdzeichen form.

Tocharian Tha with vowel marks
Tha	Thā	Thi	Thī	Thu	Thū	Thr	Thr̄	The	Thai	Tho	Thau	Thä

=== Kharoṣṭhī Tha ===
The Kharoṣṭhī letter is generally accepted as being derived from the Aramaic Teth, and is thus related to Theta, in addition to the Brahmi Tha.

== Devanagari Tha ==
Tha (थ) is a consonant of the Devanagari abugida. It ultimately arose from the Brahmi letter, after having gone through the Gupta letter. Letters that derive from it are the Gujarati letter થ, and the Modi letter 𑘞.

=== Devanagari-using Languages ===
In all languages, थ is pronounced as [tʰə] or [tʰ] when appropriate. Like all Indic scripts, Devanagari uses vowel marks attached to the base consonant to override the inherent /ə/ vowel:

Devanagari थ with vowel marks
Tha	Thā	Thi	Thī	Thu	Thū	Thr	Thr̄	Thl	Thl̄	The	Thai	Tho	Thau	Th
थ	था	थि	थी	थु	थू	थृ	थॄ	थॢ	थॣ	थे	थै	थो	थौ	थ्

=== Conjuncts with थ ===
Half form of Tha.

Devanagari exhibits conjunct ligatures, as is common in Indic scripts. In modern Devanagari texts, most conjuncts are formed by reducing the letter shape to fit tightly to the following letter, usually by dropping a character's vertical stem, sometimes referred to as a "half form". Some conjunct clusters are always represented by a true ligature, instead of a shape that can be broken into constituent independent letters. Vertically stacked conjuncts are ubiquitous in older texts, while only a few are still used routinely in modern Devanagari texts. The use of ligatures and vertical conjuncts may vary across languages using the Devanagari script, with Marathi in particular preferring the use of half forms where texts in other languages would show ligatures and vertical stacks.

==== Ligature conjuncts of थ ====
True ligatures are quite rare in Indic scripts. The most common ligated conjuncts in Devanagari are in the form of a slight mutation to fit in context or as a consistent variant form appended to the adjacent characters. Those variants include Na and the Repha and Rakar forms of Ra. Nepali and Marathi texts use the "eyelash" Ra half form for an initial "R" instead of repha.

- Repha र্ (r) + थ (tʰa) gives the ligature rtʰa: ^{note}

- Eyelash र্ (r) + थ (tʰa) gives the ligature rtʰa:

- थ্ (tʰ) + न (na) gives the ligature tʰna:

- थ্ (tʰ) + rakar र (ra) gives the ligature tʰra:

==== Stacked conjuncts of थ ====
Vertically stacked ligatures are the most common conjunct forms found in Devanagari text. Although the constituent characters may need to be stretched and moved slightly in order to stack neatly, stacked conjuncts can be broken down into recognizable base letters, or a letter and an otherwise standard ligature.

- छ্ (cʰ) + थ (tʰa) gives the ligature cʰtʰa:

- ढ্ (ḍʱ) + थ (tʰa) gives the ligature ḍʱtʰa:

- ड্ (ḍ) + थ (tʰa) gives the ligature ḍtʰa:

- द্ (d) + थ (tʰa) gives the ligature dtʰa:

- ङ্ (ŋ) + थ (tʰa) gives the ligature ŋtʰa:

- थ্ (tʰ) + च (ca) gives the ligature tʰca:

- थ্ (tʰ) + ड (ḍa) gives the ligature tʰḍa:

- थ্ (tʰ) + ज্ (j) + ञ (ña) gives the ligature tʰjña:

- थ্ (tʰ) + ल (la) gives the ligature tʰla:

- थ্ (tʰ) + ङ (ŋa) gives the ligature tʰŋa:

- थ্ (tʰ) + ञ (ña) gives the ligature tʰña:

- ठ্ (ṭʰ) + थ (tʰa) gives the ligature ṭʰtʰa:

- ट্ (ṭ) + थ (tʰa) gives the ligature ṭtʰa:

== Bengali Tha ==
The Bengali script থ is derived from the Siddhaṃ, and is marked by a similar horizontal head line, but less geometric shape, than its Devanagari counterpart, थ. The inherent vowel of Bengali consonant letters is /ɔ/, so the bare letter থ will sometimes be transliterated as "tho" instead of "tha". Adding okar, the "o" vowel mark, gives a reading of /t̪ʰo/. Like all Indic consonants, থ can be modified by marks to indicate another (or no) vowel than its inherent "a".

Bengali থ with vowel marks
tha	thā	thi	thī	thu	thū	thr	thr̄	the	thai	tho	thau	th
থ	থা	থি	থী	থু	থূ	থৃ	থৄ	থে	থৈ	থো	থৌ	থ্

=== থ in Bengali-using languages ===
থ is used as a basic consonant character in all of the major Bengali script orthographies, including Bengali and Assamese.

=== Conjuncts with থ ===
Bengali থ exhibits conjunct ligatures, as is common in Indic scripts, with a tendency towards stacked ligatures.

- ন্ (n) + থ (tʰa) gives the ligature ntʰa:

- ন্ (n) + থ্ (tʰ) + র (ra) gives the ligature ntʰra, with the ra phala suffix:

- র্ (r) + থ (tʰa) gives the ligature rtʰa, with the repha prefix:

- র্ (r) + থ্ (tʰ) + য (ya) gives the ligature rtʰya, with the repha prefix and ya phala suffix:

- স্ (s) + থ (tʰa) gives the ligature stʰa:

- স্ (s) + থ্ (tʰ) + য (ya) gives the ligature stʰya, with the ya phala suffix:

- থ্ (tʰ) + র (ra) gives the ligature tʰra, with the ra phala suffix:

- থ্ (tʰ) + ব (va) gives the ligature tʰva, with the va phala suffix:

- থ্ (tʰ) + য (ya) gives the ligature tʰya, with the ya phala suffix:

- ত্ (t) + থ (tʰa) gives the ligature ttʰa:

== Gujarati Tha ==
Gujarati Tha.

Tha (થ) is the seventeenth consonant of the Gujarati abugida. It is derived from the Devanagari Tha with the top bar (shiro rekha) removed, and ultimately the Brahmi letter.

=== Gujarati-using Languages ===
The Gujarati script is used to write the Gujarati and Kutchi languages. In both languages, થ is pronounced as [tʰə] or [tʰ] when appropriate. Like all Indic scripts, Gujarati uses vowel marks attached to the base consonant to override the inherent /ə/ vowel:

Tha	Thā	Thi	Thī	Thu	Thū	Thr	Thl	Thr̄	Thl̄	Thĕ	The	Thai	Thŏ	Tho	Thau	Th
Gujarati Tha syllables, with vowel marks in red.

=== Conjuncts with થ ===
Half form of Tha.

Gujarati થ exhibits conjunct ligatures, much like its parent Devanagari Script. Most Gujarati conjuncts can only be formed by reducing the letter shape to fit tightly to the following letter, usually by dropping a character's vertical stem, sometimes referred to as a "half form". A few conjunct clusters can be represented by a true ligature, instead of a shape that can be broken into constituent independent letters, and vertically stacked conjuncts can also be found in Gujarati, although much less commonly than in Devanagari. True ligatures are quite rare in Indic scripts. The most common ligated conjuncts in Gujarati are in the form of a slight mutation to fit in context or as a consistent variant form appended to the adjacent characters. Those variants include Na and the Repha and Rakar forms of Ra.

- ર્ (r) + થ (tʰa) gives the ligature RTha:

- થ્ (tʰ) + ર (ra) gives the ligature ThRa:

- થ્ (tʰ) + ન (na) gives the ligature ThNa:

== Telugu Tha ==
Telugu independent and subjoined Tha.

Tha (థ) is a consonant of the Telugu abugida. It ultimately arose from the Brahmi letter. It is closely related to the Kannada letter ಥ. Most Telugu consonants contain a v-shaped headstroke that is related to the horizontal headline found in other Indic scripts, although headstrokes do not connect adjacent letters in Telugu. The headstroke is normally lost when adding vowel matras. Telugu conjuncts are created by reducing trailing letters to a subjoined form that appears below the initial consonant of the conjunct. Many subjoined forms are created by dropping their headline, with many extending the end of the stroke of the main letter body to form an extended tail reaching up to the right of the preceding consonant. This subjoining of trailing letters to create conjuncts is in contrast to the leading half forms of Devanagari and Bengali letters. Ligature conjuncts are not a feature in Telugu, with the only non-standard construction being an alternate subjoined form of Ṣa (borrowed from Kannada) in the KṢa conjunct.

== Malayalam Tha ==
Malayalam letter Tha

Tha (ഥ) is a consonant of the Malayalam abugida. It ultimately arose from the Brahmi letter, via the Grantha letter Tha. Like in other Indic scripts, Malayalam consonants have the inherent vowel "a", and take one of several modifying vowel signs to represent syllables with another vowel or no vowel at all.

Malayalam Tha matras: Tha, Thā, Thi, Thī, Thu, Thū, Thr̥, Thr̥̄, Thl̥, Thl̥̄, The, Thē, Thai, Tho, Thō, Thau, and Th.

=== Conjuncts of ഥ ===
As is common in Indic scripts, Malayalam joins letters together to form conjunct consonant clusters. There are several ways in which conjuncts are formed in Malayalam texts: using a post-base form of a trailing consonant placed under the initial consonant of a conjunct, a combined ligature of two or more consonants joined together, a conjoining form that appears as a combining mark on the rest of the conjunct, the use of an explicit candrakkala mark to suppress the inherent "a" vowel, or a special consonant form called a "chillu" letter, representing a bare consonant without the inherent "a" vowel. Texts written with the modern reformed Malayalam orthography, put̪iya lipi, may favor more regular conjunct forms than older texts in paḻaya lipi, due to changes undertaken in the 1970s by the Government of Kerala.

- ത് (t) + ഥ (tʰa) gives the ligature ttʰa:

- ന് (n) + ഥ (tʰa) gives the ligature ntʰa:

- സ് (s) + ഥ (tʰa) gives the ligature stʰa:

== Odia Tha ==
Odia independent and subjoined letter Tha.

Tha (ଥ) is a consonant of the Odia abugida. It ultimately arose from the Brahmi letter, via the Siddhaṃ letter Tha. Like in other Indic scripts, Odia consonants have the inherent vowel "a", and take one of several modifying vowel signs to represent syllables with another vowel or no vowel at all. Like other Oriya letters with an open top, ଥ takes the subjoined matra form of the vowel i (ଇ):

Odia Tha with vowel matras
Tha	Thā	Thi	Thī	Thu	Thū	Thr̥	Thr̥̄	Thl̥	Thl̥̄	The	Thai	Tho	Thau	Th
ଥ	ଥା	ଥି	ଥୀ	ଥୁ	ଥୂ	ଥୃ	ଥୄ	ଥୢ	ଥୣ	ଥେ	ଥୈ	ଥୋ	ଥୌ	ଥ୍

As is common in Indic scripts, Odia joins letters together to form conjunct consonant clusters. The most common conjunct formation is achieved by using a small subjoined form of trailing consonants. Most consonants' subjoined forms are identical to the full form, just reduced in size, although a few drop the curved headline or have a subjoined form not directly related to the full form of the consonant. The second type of conjunct formation is through pure ligatures, where the constituent consonants are written together in a single graphic form. ଥ generates conjuncts only by subjoining and does not form ligatures. The subjoined form of ଥ is identical to a subjoined form of Cha used in limited contexts.

== Kaithi Tha ==
Kaithi consonant and half-form Tha.

Tha (𑂟) is a consonant of the Kaithi abugida. It ultimately arose from the Brahmi letter, via the Siddhaṃ letter Tha. Like in other Indic scripts, Kaithi consonants have the inherent vowel "a", and take one of several modifying vowel signs to represent syllables with another vowel or no vowel at all.

Kaithi Tha with vowel matras
Tha	Thā	Thi	Thī	Thu	Thū	The	Thai	Tho	Thau	Th
𑂟	𑂟𑂰	𑂟𑂱	𑂟𑂲	𑂟𑂳	𑂟𑂴	𑂟𑂵	𑂟𑂶	𑂟𑂷	𑂟𑂸	𑂟𑂹

=== Conjuncts of 𑂟 ===
As is common in Indic scripts, Kaithi joins letters together to form conjunct consonant clusters. The most common conjunct formation is achieved by using a half form of preceding consonants, although several consonants use an explicit virama. Most half forms are derived from the full form by removing the vertical stem. As is common in most Indic scripts, conjuncts of ra are indicated with a repha or rakar mark attached to the rest of the consonant cluster. In addition, there are a few vertical conjuncts that can be found in Kaithi writing, but true ligatures are not used in the modern Kaithi script.

- 𑂟୍ (tʰ) + 𑂩 (ra) gives the ligature tʰra:

- 𑂩୍ (r) + 𑂟 (tʰa) gives the ligature rtʰa:

== Tirhuta Tha ==
Tirhuta consonant Tha

Tha (𑒟) is a consonant of the Tirhuta abugida. It ultimately arose from the Brahmi letter, via the Siddhaṃ letter Tha. Like in other Indic scripts, Tirhuta consonants have the inherent vowel "a", and take one of several modifying vowel signs to represent sylables with another vowel or no vowel at all.

Tirhuta Tha with vowel matras
Tha	Thā	Thi	Thī	Thu	Thū	ṛ	ṝ	ḷ	ḹ	Thē	The	Thai	Thō	Tho	Thau	Th
𑒟	𑒟𑒰	𑒟𑒱	𑒟𑒲	𑒟𑒳	𑒟𑒴	𑒟𑒵	𑒟𑒶	𑒟𑒷	𑒟𑒸	𑒟𑒹	𑒟𑒺	𑒟𑒻	𑒟𑒼	𑒟𑒽	𑒟𑒾	𑒟𑓂

=== Conjuncts of 𑒟 ===
As is common in Indic scripts, Tirhuta joins letters together to form conjunct consonant clusters. The most common conjunct formation is achieved by using an explicit virama. As is common in most Indic scripts, conjuncts of ra are indicated with a repha or rakar mark attached to the rest of the consonant cluster. In addition, other consonants take unique combining forms when in conjunct with other letters, and there are several vertical conjuncts and true ligatures that can be found in Tirhuta writing.

- 𑒩୍ (r) + 𑒟 (tʰa) gives the ligature rtʰa:

- 𑒟୍ (tʰ) + 𑒩 (ra) gives the ligature tʰra:

- 𑒟୍ (tʰ) + 𑒫 (va) gives the ligature tʰva:

- 𑒞୍ (t) + 𑒟 (tʰa) gives the ligature ttʰa:

== Comparison of Tha ==
The various Indic scripts are generally related to each other through adaptation and borrowing, and as such the glyphs for cognate letters, including Tha, are related as well.

Comparison of Tha in different scripts

Aramaic
Kharoṣṭhī 𐨠	Ashoka Brahmi	Kushana Brahmi (Note: The middle "Kushana" form of Brahmi is a later style that emerged as Brahmi scripts were beginning to proliferate. Gupta Brahmi was definitely a stylistic descendant from Kushana, but other Brahmi-derived scripts may have descended from earlier forms.)	Tocharian (Note: Tocharian is probably derived from the middle period "Kushana" form of Brahmi, although artifacts from that time are not plentiful enough to establish a definite succession.)
Gupta Brahmi	Pallava
Kadamba -
Bhaiksuki 𑰞	Siddhaṃ	Grantha 𑌥	Cham ꨔ
Sinhala ථ	Pyu / Old Mon (Note: Pyu and Old Mon are probably the precursors of the Burmese script, and may be derived from either the Pallava or Kadamba script) -
Tibetan	Newa 𑐠	Ahom 𑜌	Malayalam ഥ
Telugu థ	Burmese ထ
Lepcha ᰋ	Ranjana	Saurashtra ꢢ	Dives Akuru 𑤜
Kannada ಥ	Kayah Li ꤓ
Limbu ᤌ	Soyombo (Note: May also be derived from Devangari (see bottom left of table)) 𑩬	Khmer ថ	Tamil -
Chakma 𑄗	Tai Tham ᨳ
Meitei Mayek ꯊ	Gaudi -	Thai ถ	Lao ຖ
Tai Le ᥗ
Marchen 𑱻	Tirhuta 𑒟	New Tai Lue ᦏ	Tai Viet ꪖ / ꪗ	Aksara Kawi
'Phags-pa ꡉ	Odia ଥ	Sharada 𑆡	Rejang -	Batak -	Buginese -
Zanabazar Square 𑨚	Bengali–Assamese	Takri 𑚚	Javanese ꦡ	Balinese ᬣ	Makasar -
Hangul (Note: The Origin of Hangul from 'Phags-pa is one of limited influence, inspiring at most a few basic letter shapes. Hangul does not function as an Indic abugida.) -	Northern Nagari -	Dogri 𑠚	Laṇḍā -	Sundanese -	Baybayin -
Modi 𑘞	Gujarati થ	Khojki 𑈚	Khudabadi 𑋎	Mahajani 𑅤	Tagbanwa -
Devanagari	Nandinagari 𑦾	Kaithi	Gurmukhi ਥ	Multani 𑊗	Buhid -
Canadian Syllabics (Note: Although the basic letter forms of the Canadian Aboriginal Syllabics were derived from handwritten Devanagari letters, this abugida indicates vowel sounds by rotations of the letter form, rather than the use of vowel diacritics as is standard in Indic abugidas.) -	Soyombo (Note: May also be derived from Ranjana (see above)) 𑩬	Sylheti Nagari ꠕ	Gunjala Gondi 𑵴	Masaram Gondi (Note: Masaram Gondi acts as an Indic abugida, but its letterforms were not derived from any single precursor script.) 𑴜	Hanuno'o -

== Character encodings of Tha ==
Most Indic scripts are encoded in the Unicode Standard, and as such the letter Tha in those scripts can be represented in plain text with unique codepoint. Tha from several modern-use scripts can also be found in legacy encodings, such as ISCII.

Character information
Preview					థ		ଥ		ಥ		ഥ		થ		ਥ	
Unicode name	DEVANAGARI LETTER THA		BENGALI LETTER THA		TELUGU LETTER THA		ORIYA LETTER THA		KANNADA LETTER THA		MALAYALAM LETTER THA		GUJARATI LETTER THA		GURMUKHI LETTER THA	
Encodings	decimal	hex	dec	hex	dec	hex	dec	hex	dec	hex	dec	hex	dec	hex	dec	hex
Unicode	2341	U+0925	2469	U+09A5	3109	U+0C25	2853	U+0B25	3237	U+0CA5	3365	U+0D25	2725	U+0AA5	2597	U+0A25
UTF-8	224 164 165	E0 A4 A5	224 166 165	E0 A6 A5	224 176 165	E0 B0 A5	224 172 165	E0 AC A5	224 178 165	E0 B2 A5	224 180 165	E0 B4 A5	224 170 165	E0 AA A5	224 168 165	E0 A8 A5
Numeric character reference	&#2341;	&#x925;	&#2469;	&#x9A5;	&#3109;	&#xC25;	&#2853;	&#xB25;	&#3237;	&#xCA5;	&#3365;	&#xD25;	&#2725;	&#xAA5;	&#2597;	&#xA25;
ISCII	195	C3	195	C3	195	C3	195	C3	195	C3	195	C3	195	C3	195	C3

Character information
Preview	Ashoka Kushana Gupta		𐨠				𑌥	
Unicode name	BRAHMI LETTER THA		KHAROSHTHI LETTER THA		SIDDHAM LETTER THA		GRANTHA LETTER THA	
Encodings	decimal	hex	dec	hex	dec	hex	dec	hex
Unicode	69667	U+11023	68128	U+10A20	71070	U+1159E	70437	U+11325
UTF-8	240 145 128 163	F0 91 80 A3	240 144 168 160	F0 90 A8 A0	240 145 150 158	F0 91 96 9E	240 145 140 165	F0 91 8C A5
UTF-16	55300 56355	D804 DC23	55298 56864	D802 DE20	55301 56734	D805 DD9E	55300 57125	D804 DF25
Numeric character reference	&#69667;	&#x11023;	&#68128;	&#x10A20;	&#71070;	&#x1159E;	&#70437;	&#x11325;

Character information
Preview			ྠ		ꡉ		𑨚		𑐠		𑰞		𑆡	
Unicode name	TIBETAN LETTER THA		TIBETAN SUBJOINED LETTER THA		PHAGS-PA LETTER THA		ZANABAZAR SQUARE LETTER THA		NEWA LETTER THA		BHAIKSUKI LETTER THA		SHARADA LETTER THA	
Encodings	decimal	hex	dec	hex	dec	hex	dec	hex	dec	hex	dec	hex	dec	hex
Unicode	3920	U+0F50	4000	U+0FA0	43081	U+A849	72218	U+11A1A	70688	U+11420	72734	U+11C1E	70049	U+111A1
UTF-8	224 189 144	E0 BD 90	224 190 160	E0 BE A0	234 161 137	EA A1 89	240 145 168 154	F0 91 A8 9A	240 145 144 160	F0 91 90 A0	240 145 176 158	F0 91 B0 9E	240 145 134 161	F0 91 86 A1
UTF-16	3920	0F50	4000	0FA0	43081	A849	55302 56858	D806 DE1A	55301 56352	D805 DC20	55303 56350	D807 DC1E	55300 56737	D804 DDA1
Numeric character reference	&#3920;	&#xF50;	&#4000;	&#xFA0;	&#43081;	&#xA849;	&#72218;	&#x11A1A;	&#70688;	&#x11420;	&#72734;	&#x11C1E;	&#70049;	&#x111A1;

Character information
Preview	ထ		ᨳ		ᦏ	
Unicode name	MYANMAR LETTER THA		TAI THAM LETTER HIGH THA		NEW TAI LUE LETTER HIGH THA	
Encodings	decimal	hex	dec	hex	dec	hex
Unicode	4113	U+1011	6707	U+1A33	6543	U+198F
UTF-8	225 128 145	E1 80 91	225 168 179	E1 A8 B3	225 166 143	E1 A6 8F
Numeric character reference	&#4113;	&#x1011;	&#6707;	&#x1A33;	&#6543;	&#x198F;

Character information
Preview	ថ		ຖ		ถ		ꪖ		ꪗ	
Unicode name	KHMER LETTER THA		LAO LETTER THO SUNG		THAI CHARACTER THO THUNG		TAI VIET LETTER LOW THO		TAI VIET LETTER HIGH THO	
Encodings	decimal	hex	dec	hex	dec	hex	dec	hex	dec	hex
Unicode	6032	U+1790	3734	U+0E96	3606	U+0E16	43670	U+AA96	43671	U+AA97
UTF-8	225 158 144	E1 9E 90	224 186 150	E0 BA 96	224 184 150	E0 B8 96	234 170 150	EA AA 96	234 170 151	EA AA 97
Numeric character reference	&#6032;	&#x1790;	&#3734;	&#xE96;	&#3606;	&#xE16;	&#43670;	&#xAA96;	&#43671;	&#xAA97;

Character information
Preview	ථ		ꤓ		𑄗		ᥗ		𑜌		𑤜		ꢢ		ꨔ	
Unicode name	SINHALA LETTER MAHAAPRAANA TAYANNA		KAYAH LI LETTER HTA		CHAKMA LETTER THAA		TAI LE LETTER THA		AHOM LETTER THA		DIVES AKURU LETTER THA		SAURASHTRA LETTER THA		CHAM LETTER THA	
Encodings	decimal	hex	dec	hex	dec	hex	dec	hex	dec	hex	dec	hex	dec	hex	dec	hex
Unicode	3502	U+0DAE	43283	U+A913	69911	U+11117	6487	U+1957	71436	U+1170C	71964	U+1191C	43170	U+A8A2	43540	U+AA14
UTF-8	224 182 174	E0 B6 AE	234 164 147	EA A4 93	240 145 132 151	F0 91 84 97	225 165 151	E1 A5 97	240 145 156 140	F0 91 9C 8C	240 145 164 156	F0 91 A4 9C	234 162 162	EA A2 A2	234 168 148	EA A8 94
UTF-16	3502	0DAE	43283	A913	55300 56599	D804 DD17	6487	1957	55301 57100	D805 DF0C	55302 56604	D806 DD1C	43170	A8A2	43540	AA14
Numeric character reference	&#3502;	&#xDAE;	&#43283;	&#xA913;	&#69911;	&#x11117;	&#6487;	&#x1957;	&#71436;	&#x1170C;	&#71964;	&#x1191C;	&#43170;	&#xA8A2;	&#43540;	&#xAA14;

Character information
Preview	𑘞		𑦾		𑩬		ꠕ		𑵴			
Unicode name	MODI LETTER THA		NANDINAGARI LETTER THA		SOYOMBO LETTER THA		SYLOTI NAGRI LETTER THO		GUNJALA GONDI LETTER THA		KAITHI LETTER THA	
Encodings	decimal	hex	dec	hex	dec	hex	dec	hex	dec	hex	dec	hex
Unicode	71198	U+1161E	72126	U+119BE	72300	U+11A6C	43029	U+A815	73076	U+11D74	69791	U+1109F
UTF-8	240 145 152 158	F0 91 98 9E	240 145 166 190	F0 91 A6 BE	240 145 169 172	F0 91 A9 AC	234 160 149	EA A0 95	240 145 181 180	F0 91 B5 B4	240 145 130 159	F0 91 82 9F
UTF-16	55301 56862	D805 DE1E	55302 56766	D806 DDBE	55302 56940	D806 DE6C	43029	A815	55303 56692	D807 DD74	55300 56479	D804 DC9F
Numeric character reference	&#71198;	&#x1161E;	&#72126;	&#x119BE;	&#72300;	&#x11A6C;	&#43029;	&#xA815;	&#73076;	&#x11D74;	&#69791;	&#x1109F;

Character information
Preview	𑒟		ᰋ		ᤌ		ꯊ		𑱻	
Unicode name	TIRHUTA LETTER THA		LEPCHA LETTER THA		LIMBU LETTER THA		MEETEI MAYEK LETTER THOU		MARCHEN LETTER THA	
Encodings	decimal	hex	dec	hex	dec	hex	dec	hex	dec	hex
Unicode	70815	U+1149F	7179	U+1C0B	6412	U+190C	43978	U+ABCA	72827	U+11C7B
UTF-8	240 145 146 159	F0 91 92 9F	225 176 139	E1 B0 8B	225 164 140	E1 A4 8C	234 175 138	EA AF 8A	240 145 177 187	F0 91 B1 BB
UTF-16	55301 56479	D805 DC9F	7179	1C0B	6412	190C	43978	ABCA	55303 56443	D807 DC7B
Numeric character reference	&#70815;	&#x1149F;	&#7179;	&#x1C0B;	&#6412;	&#x190C;	&#43978;	&#xABCA;	&#72827;	&#x11C7B;

Character information
Preview	𑚚		𑠚		𑈚		𑋎		𑅤		𑊗	
Unicode name	TAKRI LETTER THA		DOGRA LETTER THA		KHOJKI LETTER THA		KHUDAWADI LETTER THA		MAHAJANI LETTER THA		MULTANI LETTER THA	
Encodings	decimal	hex	dec	hex	dec	hex	dec	hex	dec	hex	dec	hex
Unicode	71322	U+1169A	71706	U+1181A	70170	U+1121A	70350	U+112CE	69988	U+11164	70295	U+11297
UTF-8	240 145 154 154	F0 91 9A 9A	240 145 160 154	F0 91 A0 9A	240 145 136 154	F0 91 88 9A	240 145 139 142	F0 91 8B 8E	240 145 133 164	F0 91 85 A4	240 145 138 151	F0 91 8A 97
UTF-16	55301 56986	D805 DE9A	55302 56346	D806 DC1A	55300 56858	D804 DE1A	55300 57038	D804 DECE	55300 56676	D804 DD64	55300 56983	D804 DE97
Numeric character reference	&#71322;	&#x1169A;	&#71706;	&#x1181A;	&#70170;	&#x1121A;	&#70350;	&#x112CE;	&#69988;	&#x11164;	&#70295;	&#x11297;

Character information
Preview	ᬣ		ꦡ	
Unicode name	BALINESE LETTER TA TAWA		JAVANESE LETTER TA MURDA	
Encodings	decimal	hex	dec	hex
Unicode	6947	U+1B23	43425	U+A9A1
UTF-8	225 172 163	E1 AC A3	234 166 161	EA A6 A1
Numeric character reference	&#6947;	&#x1B23;	&#43425;	&#xA9A1;

Character information
Preview	𑴜	
Unicode name	MASARAM GONDI LETTER THA	
Encodings	decimal	hex
Unicode	72988	U+11D1C
UTF-8	240 145 180 156	F0 91 B4 9C
UTF-16	55303 56604	D807 DD1C
Numeric character reference	&#72988;	&#x11D1C;
