= Cha (Indic) =

Letter "Cha" in Indic scripts

Example glyphs
- Bengali–Assamese: Cha
- Tibetan: Cha
- Thai: ฉ
- Malayalam: ഛ
- Sinhala: ඡ
- Ashoka Brahmi: Cha
- Devanagari: Cha

Cognates
- Hebrew: ק
- Greek: Ϙ (Ϟ), Φ
- Latin: Q
- Cyrillic: Ҁ, Ф

Properties
- Phonemic representation: /t͡ɕʰ/
- IAST transliteration: cha Cha
- ISCII code point: B9 (185)

Cha is the seventh consonant of Indic abugidas. In modern Indic scripts, cha is derived from the early "Ashoka" Brahmi letter, which is probably derived from the Aramaic letter ("Q") after having gone through the Gupta letter.

== Āryabhaṭa numeration ==
Aryabhata used Devanagari letters for numbers, very similar to the Greek numerals, even after the invention of Indian numerals. The values of the different forms of छ are:

- छ [t͡ɕʰə] = 7 (७)
- छि [t͡ɕʰi] = 700 (७००)
- छु [t͡ɕʰu] = 70,000 (७० ०००)
- छृ [t͡ɕʰr̩] = 7,000,000 (७० ०० ०००)
- छॢ [t͡ɕʰl̩] = 7×10^{8} (७०^{८})
- छे [t͡ɕʰeː] = 7×10^{10} (७०^{१०})
- छै [t͡ɕʰəi̯] = 7×10^{12} (७०^{१२})
- छो [t͡ɕʰoː] = 7×10^{14} (७०^{१४})
- छौ [t͡ɕʰəu̯] = 7×10^{16} (७०^{१६})

== Historic Cha ==
There are three different general early historic scripts - Brahmi and its variants, Kharoṣṭhī, and Tocharian, the so-called slanting Brahmi. Cha as found in standard Brahmi, was a simple geometric shape, with variations toward more flowing forms by the Gupta. The Tocharian Cha did not have an alternate Fremdzeichen form. The third form of cha, in Kharoshthi was probably derived from Aramaic separately from the Brahmi letter.

=== Brahmi Cha ===
The Brahmi letter, Cha, is probably derived from the altered Aramaic Tsade, and is thus related to the Greek San (letter). Several identifiable styles of writing the Brahmi Cha can be found, most associated with a specific set of inscriptions from an artifact or diverse records from an historic period. As the earliest and most geometric style of Brahmi, the letters found on the Edicts of Ashoka and other records from around that time are normally the reference form for Brahmi letters, with vowel marks not attested until later forms of Brahmi back-formed to match the geometric writing style.

Brahmi Cha historic forms
Ashoka (3rd-1st c. BCE)	Girnar (~150 BCE)	Kushana (~150-250 CE)	Gujarat (~250 CE)	Gupta (~350 CE)

=== Tocharian Cha ===
The Tocharian letter is derived from the Brahmi, but does not have an alternate Fremdzeichen form.

Tocharian Cha with vowel marks
Cha	Chā	Chi	Chī	Chu	Chū	Chr	Chr̄	Che	Chai	Cho	Chau	Chä

=== Kharoṣṭhī Cha ===
The Kharoṣṭhī letter is generally accepted as being derived from the altered Aramaic Tsade, and is thus related to the Greek San (letter), in addition to the Brahmi Cha.

== Devanagari script ==
Cha (छ) is the seventh consonant of the Devanagari abugida. It ultimately arose from the Brahmi letter, after having gone through the Gupta letter. Letters that derive from it are the Gujarati letter છ and the Modi letter 𑘔.

=== Devanagari-using Languages ===
In most languages, छ is pronounced as [t͡ʃʰə] or [t͡ʃʰ] when appropriate, while in standard Nepali, it is pronounced as [t͡sʰ]. Like all Indic scripts, Devanagari uses vowel marks attached to the base consonant to override the inherent /ə/ vowel:

Devanagari छ with vowel marks
Cha	Chā	Chi	Chī	Chu	Chū	Chr	Chr̄	Chl	Chl̄	Che	Chai	Cho	Chau	Ch
छ	छा	छि	छी	छु	छू	छृ	छॄ	छॢ	छॣ	छे	छै	छो	छौ	छ्

=== Conjuncts with छ ===
Half form of Cha.

Devanagari exhibits conjunct ligatures, as is common in Indic scripts. In modern Devanagari texts, most conjuncts are formed by reducing the letter shape to fit tightly to the following letter, usually by dropping a character's vertical stem, sometimes referred to as a "half form". Some conjunct clusters are always represented by a true ligature, instead of a shape that can be broken into constituent independent letters. Vertically stacked conjuncts are ubiquitous in older texts, while only a few are still used routinely in modern Devanagari texts. The use of ligatures and vertical conjuncts may vary across languages using the Devanagari script, with Marathi in particular preferring the use of half forms where texts in other languages would show ligatures and vertical stacks.

==== Ligature conjuncts of छ ====
True ligatures are quite rare in Indic scripts. The most common ligated conjuncts in Devanagari are in the form of a slight mutation to fit in context or as a consistent variant form appended to the adjacent characters. Those variants include Na and the Repha and Rakar forms of Ra. Nepali and Marathi texts use the "eyelash" Ra half form for an initial "R" instead of repha.

- Repha र্ (r) + छ (cʰa) gives the ligature rcʰa: ^{note}

- Eyelash र্ (r) + छ (cʰa) gives the ligature rcʰa:

- छ্ (cʰ) + rakar र (ra) gives the ligature cʰra:

==== Stacked conjuncts of छ ====
Vertically stacked ligatures are the most common conjunct forms found in Devanagari text. Although the constituent characters may need to be stretched and moved slightly in order to stack neatly, stacked conjuncts can be broken down into recognizable base letters, or a letter and an otherwise standard ligature.

- ब্ (b) + छ (cʰa) gives the ligature bcʰa:

- छ্ (cʰ) + ब (ba) gives the ligature cʰba:

- छ্ (cʰ) + भ (bʰa) gives the ligature cʰbʰa:

- छ্ (cʰ) + च (ca) gives the ligature cʰca:

- छ্ (cʰ) + छ (cʰa) gives the ligature cʰcʰa:

- छ্ (cʰ) + द (da) gives the ligature cʰda:

- छ্ (cʰ) + ड (ḍa) gives the ligature cʰḍa:

- छ্ (cʰ) + ढ (ḍʱa) gives the ligature cʰḍʱa:

- छ্ (cʰ) + ध (dʱa) gives the ligature cʰdʱa:

- छ্ (cʰ) + ग (ga) gives the ligature cʰga:

- छ্ (cʰ) + घ (ɡʱa) gives the ligature cʰɡʱa:

- छ্ (cʰ) + ह (ha) gives the ligature cʰha:

- छ্ (cʰ) + ज (ja) gives the ligature cʰja:

- छ্ (cʰ) + झ (jʰa) gives the ligature cʰjʰa:

- छ্ (cʰ) + ज্ (j) + ञ (ña) gives the ligature cʰjña:

- छ্ (cʰ) + क (ka) gives the ligature cʰka:

- छ্ (cʰ) + ख (kʰa) gives the ligature cʰkʰa:

- छ্ (cʰ) + क্ (k) + ष (ṣa) gives the ligature cʰkṣa:

- छ্ (cʰ) + ल (la) gives the ligature cʰla:

- छ্ (cʰ) + ळ (ḷa) gives the ligature cʰḷa:

- छ্ (cʰ) + म (ma) gives the ligature cʰma:

- छ্ (cʰ) + न (na) gives the ligature cʰna:

- छ্ (cʰ) + ङ (ŋa) gives the ligature cʰŋa:

- छ্ (cʰ) + ण (ṇa) gives the ligature cʰṇa:

- छ্ (cʰ) + ञ (ña) gives the ligature cʰña:

- छ্ (cʰ) + प (pa) gives the ligature cʰpa:

- छ্ (cʰ) + फ (pʰa) gives the ligature cʰpʰa:

- छ্ (cʰ) + स (sa) gives the ligature cʰsa:

- छ্ (cʰ) + श (ʃa) gives the ligature cʰʃa:

- छ্ (cʰ) + ष (ṣa) gives the ligature cʰṣa:

- छ্ (cʰ) + त (ta) gives the ligature cʰta:

- छ্ (cʰ) + थ (tʰa) gives the ligature cʰtʰa:

- छ্ (cʰ) + ट (ṭa) gives the ligature cʰṭa:

- छ্ (cʰ) + ठ (ṭʰa) gives the ligature cʰṭʰa:

- छ্ (cʰ) + व (va) gives the ligature cʰva:

- छ্ (cʰ) + य (ya) gives the ligature cʰya:

- द্ (d) + छ (cʰa) gives the ligature dcʰa:

- ड্ (ḍ) + छ (cʰa) gives the ligature ḍcʰa:

- ढ্ (ḍʱ) + छ (cʰa) gives the ligature ḍʱcʰa:

- ख্ (kʰ) + छ (cʰa) gives the ligature kʰcʰa:

- ङ্ (ŋ) + छ (cʰa) gives the ligature ŋcʰa:

- ट্ (ṭ) + छ (cʰa) gives the ligature ṭcʰa:

- ठ্ (ṭʰ) + छ (cʰa) gives the ligature ṭʰcʰa:

- व্ (v) + छ (cʰa) gives the ligature vcʰa:

== Bengali script ==
The Bengali script ছ is derived from the Siddhaṃ, and is marked by a similar horizontal head line, but less geometric shape, than its Devanagari counterpart, छ. The inherent vowel of Bengali consonant letters is /ɔ/, so the bare letter ছ will sometimes be transliterated as "cho" instead of "cha". Adding okar, the "o" vowel mark, gives a reading of /cʰo/. Like all Indic consonants, ছ can be modified by marks to indicate another (or no) vowel than its inherent "a".

Bengali ছ with vowel marks
cha	chā	chi	chī	chu	chū	chr	chr̄	che	chai	cho	chau	ch
ছ	ছা	ছি	ছী	ছু	ছূ	ছৃ	ছৄ	ছে	ছৈ	ছো	ছৌ	ছ্

=== ছ in Bengali-using languages ===
ছ is used as a basic consonant character in all of the major Bengali script orthographies, including Bengali and Assamese.

=== Conjuncts with ছ ===
Bengali ছ exhibits conjunct ligatures, as is common in Indic scripts. Unlike most Bengali letters, conjuncts with ছ do not tend towards stacked ligatures.

- চ্ (c) + ছ (cʰa) gives the ligature ccʰa:

- চ্ (c) + ছ্ (cʰ) + র (ra) gives the ligature ccʰra, with the ra phala suffix:

- চ্ (c) + ছ্ (cʰ) + ব (va) gives the ligature ccʰva, with the va phala suffix:

- ঞ (ñ) + ছ (cʰa) gives the ligature ñcʰa:

- র্ (r) + ছ (cʰa) gives the ligature rcʰa, with the repha prefix:

- শ্ (ʃ) + ছ (cʰa) gives the ligature ʃcʰa:

== Gujarati Cha ==
Gujarati Cha.

Cha (છ) is the seventh consonant of the Gujarati abugida. It is derived from the 16th century Devanagari Cha with the top bar (shiro rekha) removed, and ultimately from the Brahmi letter.

=== Gujarati-using Languages ===
The Gujarati script is used to write the Gujarati and Kutchi languages. In both languages, છ is pronounced as [cʰə] or [cʰ] when appropriate. Like all Indic scripts, Gujarati uses vowel marks attached to the base consonant to override the inherent /ə/ vowel:

Cha	Chā	Chi	Chī	Chu	Chū	Chr	Chl	Chr̄	Chl̄	Chĕ	Che	Chai	Chŏ	Cho	Chau	Ch
Gujarati Cha syllables, with vowel marks in red.

=== Conjuncts with છ ===
Gujarati છ exhibits conjunct ligatures, much like its parent Devanagari Script. While most Gujarati conjuncts can only be formed by reducing the letter shape to create a "half form" that fits tightly to following letter, Cha does not have a half form. A few conjunct clusters can be represented by a true ligature, instead of a shape that can be broken into constituent independent letters, and vertically stacked conjuncts can also be found in Gujarati, although much less commonly than in Devanagari. Lacking a half form, Cha will normally use an explicit virama when forming conjuncts without a true ligature. True ligatures are quite rare in Indic scripts. The most common ligated conjuncts in Gujarati are in the form of a slight mutation to fit in context or as a consistent variant form appended to the adjacent characters. Those variants include Na and the Repha and Rakar forms of Ra.

- ર્ (r) + છ (cʰa) gives the ligature RCha:

- છ્ (cʰ) + ર (ra) gives the ligature ChRa:

== Gurmukhi script ==
Chhachhaa [t͡ʃʰət͡ʃʰːɑ] (ਛ) is the twelfth letter of the Gurmukhi alphabet. Its name is [t͡ʃʰət͡ʃʰːɑ] and is pronounced as /t͡ʃʰ/ when used in words. It is derived from the Laṇḍā letter cha, and ultimately from the Brahmi cha. Gurmukhi chachaa does not have a special pairin or addha (reduced) form for making conjuncts, and in modern Punjabi texts do not take a half form or halant to indicate the bare consonant /t͡ʃʰ/, although Gurmukhi Sanskrit texts may use an explicit halant.

== Telugu Cha ==
Telugu independent and subjoined Cha.

Cha (ఛ) is a consonant of the Telugu abugida. It ultimately arose from the Brahmi letter. It is closely related to the Kannada letter ಛ. Most Telugu consonants contain a v-shaped headstroke that is related to the horizontal headline found in other Indic scripts, although headstrokes do not connect adjacent letters in Telugu. The headstroke is normally lost when adding vowel matras. Telugu conjuncts are created by reducing trailing letters to a subjoined form that appears below the initial consonant of the conjunct. Many subjoined forms are created by dropping their headline, with many extending the end of the stroke of the main letter body to form an extended tail reaching up to the right of the preceding consonant. This subjoining of trailing letters to create conjuncts is in contrast to the leading half forms of Devanagari and Bengali letters. Ligature conjuncts are not a feature in Telugu, with the only non-standard construction being an alternate subjoined form of Ṣa (borrowed from Kannada) in the KṢa conjunct.

== Malayalam Cha ==
Malayalam letter Cha

Cha (ഛ) is a consonant of the Malayalam abugida. It ultimately arose from the Brahmi letter, via the Grantha letter Cha. Like in other Indic scripts, Malayalam consonants have the inherent vowel "a", and take one of several modifying vowel signs to represent syllables with another vowel or no vowel at all.

Malayalam Cha matras: Cha, Chā, Chi, Chī, Chu, Chū, Chr̥, Chr̥̄, Chl̥, Chl̥̄, Che, Chē, Chai, Cho, Chō, Chau, and Ch.

=== Conjuncts of ഛ ===
As is common in Indic scripts, Malayalam joins letters together to form conjunct consonant clusters. There are several ways in which conjuncts are formed in Malayalam texts: using a post-base form of a trailing consonant placed under the initial consonant of a conjunct, a combined ligature of two or more consonants joined, a conjoining form that appears as a combining mark on the rest of the conjunct, the use of an explicit candrakkala mark to suppress the inherent "a" vowel, or a special consonant form called a "chillu" letter, representing a bare consonant without the inherent "a" vowel. Cha does not form ligatures or other combining forms, and Cha conjuncts can only be formed with post-base forms of other letter or an explicit candrakkala. Texts written with the modern reformed Malayalam orthography, put̪iya lipi, may favor more regular conjunct forms than older texts in paḻaya lipi, due to changes undertaken in the 1970s by the Government of Kerala.

== Thai script ==
Cho ching (ฉ) is the ninth letter of the Thai script. It falls under the high class of Thai consonants. In IPA, cho ching is pronounced as [tɕʰ] at the beginning of a syllable and may not be used to close a syllable. The eighth letter of the alphabet, cho chan (จ), is also named cho but represents a different initial consonant sound ([tɕ]) and falls under the middle class of Thai consonants. The tenth and twelfth letters of the alphabet, cho chang (ช) and cho choe (ฌ), are also named cho, however, they all fall under the low class of Thai consonants. Unlike many Indic scripts, Thai consonants do not form conjunct ligatures, and use the pinthu—an explicit virama with a dot shape—to indicate bare consonants. In the acrophony of the Thai script, ching (ฉิ่ง) means ‘cymbals (ching)’. Cho ching corresponds to the Sanskrit character ‘छ’.

== Odia Cha ==
Odia independent and subjoined letter Cha.

Cha (ଛ) is a consonant of the Odia abugida. It ultimately arose from the Brahmi letter, via the Siddhaṃ letter Cha. Like in other Indic scripts, Odia consonants have the inherent vowel "a", and take one of several modifying vowel signs to represent syllables with another vowel or no vowel at all.

Odia Cha with vowel matras
Cha	Chā	Chi	Chī	Chu	Chū	Chr̥	Chr̥̄	Chl̥	Chl̥̄	Che	Chai	Cho	Chau	Ch
ଛ	ଛା	ଛି	ଛୀ	ଛୁ	ଛୂ	ଛୃ	ଛୄ	ଛୢ	ଛୣ	ଛେ	ଛୈ	ଛୋ	ଛୌ	ଛ୍

=== Conjuncts of ଛ ===
As is common in Indic scripts, Odia joins letters together to form conjunct consonant clusters. The most common conjunct formation is achieved by using a small subjoined form of trailing consonants. Most consonants' subjoined forms are identical to the full form, just reduced in size, although a few drop the curved headline or have a subjoined form not directly related to the full form of the consonant. The second type of conjunct formation is through pure ligatures, where the constituent consonants are written together in a single graphic form. This ligature may be recognizable as being a combination of two characters or it can have a conjunct ligature unrelated to its constituent characters. The "infinity" shaped subjoined form of Cha used in a few conjuncts is identical to the normal subjoined form of Tha and should not be confused with Tha.

- ଚ୍ (c) + ଛ (cʰa) gives the ligature ccʰa:

- ଞ୍ (ñ) + ଛ (cʰa) gives the ligature ñcʰa:

- ଶ୍ (ʃ) + ଛ (cʰa) gives the ligature ʃcʰa:

== Kaithi Cha ==
Kaithi consonant Cha.

Cha (𑂓) is a consonant of the Kaithi abugida. It ultimately arose from the Brahmi letter, via the Siddhaṃ letter Cha. Like in other Indic scripts, Kaithi consonants have the inherent vowel "a", and take one of several modifying vowel signs to represent syllables with another vowel or no vowel at all.

Kaithi Cha with vowel matras
Cha	Chā	Chi	Chī	Chu	Chū	Che	Chai	Cho	Chau	Ch
𑂓	𑂓𑂰	𑂓𑂱	𑂓𑂲	𑂓𑂳	𑂓𑂴	𑂓𑂵	𑂓𑂶	𑂓𑂷	𑂓𑂸	

=== Conjuncts of 𑂓 ===
As is common in Indic scripts, Kaithi joins letters together to form conjunct consonant clusters. The most common conjunct formation is achieved by using a half form of preceding consonants, although several consonants use an explicit virama. Most half forms are derived from the full form by removing the vertical stem. As is common in most Indic scripts, conjuncts of ra are indicated with a repha or rakar mark attached to the rest of the consonant cluster. In addition, there are a few vertical conjuncts that can be found in Kaithi writing, but true ligatures are not used in the modern Kaithi script.

- 𑂩୍ (r) + 𑂓 (cʰa) gives the ligature rcʰa:

== Tirhuta Cha ==
Tirhuta consonant Cha

Cha (𑒕) is a consonant of the Tirhuta abugida. It ultimately arose from the Brahmi letter, via the Siddhaṃ letter Cha. Like in other Indic scripts, Tirhuta consonants have the inherent vowel "a", and take one of several modifying vowel signs to represent sylables with another vowel or no vowel at all.

Tirhuta Cha with vowel matras
Cha	Chā	Chi	Chī	Chu	Chū	Chṛ	Chṝ	Chḷ	Chḹ	Chē	Che	Chai	Chō	Cho	Chau	Ch
𑒕	𑒕𑒰	𑒕𑒱	𑒕𑒲	𑒕𑒳	𑒕𑒴	𑒕𑒵	𑒕𑒶	𑒕𑒷	𑒕𑒸	𑒕𑒹	𑒕𑒺	𑒕𑒻	𑒕𑒼	𑒕𑒽	𑒕𑒾	𑒕𑓂

=== Conjuncts of 𑒕 ===
As is common in Indic scripts, Tirhuta joins letters together to form conjunct consonant clusters. The most common conjunct formation is achieved by using an explicit virama. As is common in most Indic scripts, conjuncts of ra are indicated with a repha or rakar mark attached to the rest of the consonant cluster. In addition, other consonants take unique combining forms when in conjunct with other letters, and there are several vertical conjuncts and true ligatures that can be found in Tirhuta writing.

- 𑒔୍ (c) + 𑒕 (cʰa) gives the ligature ccʰa:

- 𑒕୍ (cʰ) + 𑒩 (ra) gives the ligature cʰra:

- 𑒕୍ (cʰ) + 𑒫 (va) gives the ligature cʰva:

- 𑒘୍ (ñ) + 𑒕 (cʰa) gives the ligature ñcʰa:

- 𑒩୍ (r) + 𑒕 (cʰa) gives the ligature rcʰa:

- 𑒬୍ (ʃ) + 𑒕 (cʰa) gives the ligature ʃcʰa:

- 𑒞୍ (t) + 𑒕 (cʰa) gives the ligature tcʰa:

== Comparison of Cha ==
The various Indic scripts are generally related to each other through adaptation and borrowing, and as such the glyphs for cognate letters, including Cha, are related as well.

Comparison of Cha in different scripts

Aramaic
Kharoṣṭhī 𐨖	Ashoka Brahmi	Kushana Brahmi (Note: The middle "Kushana" form of Brahmi is a later style that emerged as Brahmi scripts were beginning to proliferate. Gupta Brahmi was definitely a stylistic descendant from Kushana, but other Brahmi-derived scripts may have descended from earlier forms.)	Tocharian (Note: Tocharian is probably derived from the middle period "Kushana" form of Brahmi, although artifacts from that time are not plentiful enough to establish a definite succession.)
Gupta Brahmi	Pallava
Kadamba -
Bhaiksuki 𑰔	Siddhaṃ	Grantha 𑌛	Cham ꨍ
Sinhala ඡ	Pyu / Old Mon (Note: Pyu and Old Mon are probably the precursors of the Burmese script, and may be derived from either the Pallava or Kadamba script) -
Tibetan	Newa 𑐕	Ahom 𑜋	Malayalam ഛ
Telugu ఛ	Burmese ဆ
Lepcha ᰇ	Ranjana	Saurashtra ꢘ	Dives Akuru 𑤒
Kannada ಛ	Kayah Li -
Limbu ᤇ	Soyombo (Note: May also be derived from Devangari (see bottom left of table)) 𑩢	Khmer ឆ	Tamil -
Chakma 𑄍	Tai Tham ᨨ
Meitei Mayek -	Gaudi -	Thai ฉ	Lao ຉ
Tai Le ᥡ
Marchen 𑱷	Tirhuta 𑒕	New Tai Lue ᦉ	Tai Viet ꪌ / ꪍ	Aksara Kawi
'Phags-pa ꡅ	Odia ଛ	Sharada 𑆗	Rejang -	Batak -	Buginese -
Zanabazar Square 𑨑	Bengali–Assamese	Takri 𑚐	Javanese ꦖ	Balinese ᬙ	Makasar -
Hangul (Note: The Origin of Hangul from 'Phags-pa is one of limited influence, inspiring at most a few basic letter shapes. Hangul does not function as an Indic abugida.) -	Northern Nagari -	Dogri 𑠐	Laṇḍā -	Sundanese -	Baybayin -
Modi 𑘔	Gujarati છ	Khojki 𑈏	Khudabadi 𑋁	Mahajani 𑅚	Tagbanwa -
Devanagari	Nandinagari 𑦴	Kaithi	Gurmukhi ਛ	Multani 𑊋	Buhid -
Canadian Syllabics (Note: Although the basic letter forms of the Canadian Aboriginal Syllabics were derived from handwritten Devanagari letters, this abugida indicates vowel sounds by rotations of the letter form, rather than the use of vowel diacritics as is standard in Indic abugidas.) -	Soyombo (Note: May also be derived from Ranjana (see above)) 𑩢	Sylheti Nagari ꠍ	Gunjala Gondi 𑵼	Masaram Gondi (Note: Masaram Gondi acts as an Indic abugida, but its letterforms were not derived from any single precursor script.) 𑴒	Hanuno'o -

== Character encodings of Cha ==
Most Indic scripts are encoded in the Unicode Standard, and as such the letter Cha in those scripts can be represented in plain text with unique codepoint. Cha from several modern-use scripts can also be found in legacy encodings, such as ISCII.

Character information
Preview					ఛ		ଛ		ಛ		ഛ		છ		ਛ	
Unicode name	DEVANAGARI LETTER CHA		BENGALI LETTER CHA		TELUGU LETTER CHA		ORIYA LETTER CHA		KANNADA LETTER CHA		MALAYALAM LETTER CHA		GUJARATI LETTER CHA		GURMUKHI LETTER CHA	
Encodings	decimal	hex	dec	hex	dec	hex	dec	hex	dec	hex	dec	hex	dec	hex	dec	hex
Unicode	2331	U+091B	2459	U+099B	3099	U+0C1B	2843	U+0B1B	3227	U+0C9B	3355	U+0D1B	2715	U+0A9B	2587	U+0A1B
UTF-8	224 164 155	E0 A4 9B	224 166 155	E0 A6 9B	224 176 155	E0 B0 9B	224 172 155	E0 AC 9B	224 178 155	E0 B2 9B	224 180 155	E0 B4 9B	224 170 155	E0 AA 9B	224 168 155	E0 A8 9B
Numeric character reference	&#2331;	&#x91B;	&#2459;	&#x99B;	&#3099;	&#xC1B;	&#2843;	&#xB1B;	&#3227;	&#xC9B;	&#3355;	&#xD1B;	&#2715;	&#xA9B;	&#2587;	&#xA1B;
ISCII	185	B9	185	B9	185	B9	185	B9	185	B9	185	B9	185	B9	185	B9

Character information
Preview	Ashoka Kushana Gupta		𐨖				𑌛	
Unicode name	BRAHMI LETTER CHA		KHAROSHTHI LETTER CHA		SIDDHAM LETTER CHA		GRANTHA LETTER CHA	
Encodings	decimal	hex	dec	hex	dec	hex	dec	hex
Unicode	69657	U+11019	68118	U+10A16	71060	U+11594	70427	U+1131B
UTF-8	240 145 128 153	F0 91 80 99	240 144 168 150	F0 90 A8 96	240 145 150 148	F0 91 96 94	240 145 140 155	F0 91 8C 9B
UTF-16	55300 56345	D804 DC19	55298 56854	D802 DE16	55301 56724	D805 DD94	55300 57115	D804 DF1B
Numeric character reference	&#69657;	&#x11019;	&#68118;	&#x10A16;	&#71060;	&#x11594;	&#70427;	&#x1131B;

Character information
Preview			ྖ		ꡅ		𑨑		𑐕		𑰔		𑆗	
Unicode name	TIBETAN LETTER CHA		TIBETAN SUBJOINED LETTER CHA		PHAGS-PA LETTER CHA		ZANABAZAR SQUARE LETTER CHA		NEWA LETTER CHA		BHAIKSUKI LETTER CHA		SHARADA LETTER CHA	
Encodings	decimal	hex	dec	hex	dec	hex	dec	hex	dec	hex	dec	hex	dec	hex
Unicode	3910	U+0F46	3990	U+0F96	43077	U+A845	72209	U+11A11	70677	U+11415	72724	U+11C14	70039	U+11197
UTF-8	224 189 134	E0 BD 86	224 190 150	E0 BE 96	234 161 133	EA A1 85	240 145 168 145	F0 91 A8 91	240 145 144 149	F0 91 90 95	240 145 176 148	F0 91 B0 94	240 145 134 151	F0 91 86 97
UTF-16	3910	0F46	3990	0F96	43077	A845	55302 56849	D806 DE11	55301 56341	D805 DC15	55303 56340	D807 DC14	55300 56727	D804 DD97
Numeric character reference	&#3910;	&#xF46;	&#3990;	&#xF96;	&#43077;	&#xA845;	&#72209;	&#x11A11;	&#70677;	&#x11415;	&#72724;	&#x11C14;	&#70039;	&#x11197;

Character information
Preview	ဆ		ᨨ		ᦉ	
Unicode name	MYANMAR LETTER CHA		TAI THAM LETTER HIGH CHA		NEW TAI LUE LETTER HIGH SA	
Encodings	decimal	hex	dec	hex	dec	hex
Unicode	4102	U+1006	6696	U+1A28	6537	U+1989
UTF-8	225 128 134	E1 80 86	225 168 168	E1 A8 A8	225 166 137	E1 A6 89
Numeric character reference	&#4102;	&#x1006;	&#6696;	&#x1A28;	&#6537;	&#x1989;

Character information
Preview	ឆ		ຉ		ฉ		ꪌ		ꪍ	
Unicode name	KHMER LETTER CHA		LAO LETTER PALI CHA		THAI CHARACTER CHO CHING		TAI VIET LETTER LOW CHO		TAI VIET LETTER HIGH CHO	
Encodings	decimal	hex	dec	hex	dec	hex	dec	hex	dec	hex
Unicode	6022	U+1786	3721	U+0E89	3593	U+0E09	43660	U+AA8C	43661	U+AA8D
UTF-8	225 158 134	E1 9E 86	224 186 137	E0 BA 89	224 184 137	E0 B8 89	234 170 140	EA AA 8C	234 170 141	EA AA 8D
Numeric character reference	&#6022;	&#x1786;	&#3721;	&#xE89;	&#3593;	&#xE09;	&#43660;	&#xAA8C;	&#43661;	&#xAA8D;

Character information
Preview	ඡ		𑄍		ᥡ		𑜋		𑤒		ꢘ		ꨍ	
Unicode name	SINHALA LETTER MAHAAPRAANA CAYANNA		CHAKMA LETTER CHAA		TAI LE LETTER TSHA		AHOM LETTER CHA		DIVES AKURU LETTER CHA		SAURASHTRA LETTER CHA		CHAM LETTER CHHA	
Encodings	decimal	hex	dec	hex	dec	hex	dec	hex	dec	hex	dec	hex	dec	hex
Unicode	3489	U+0DA1	69901	U+1110D	6497	U+1961	71435	U+1170B	71954	U+11912	43160	U+A898	43533	U+AA0D
UTF-8	224 182 161	E0 B6 A1	240 145 132 141	F0 91 84 8D	225 165 161	E1 A5 A1	240 145 156 139	F0 91 9C 8B	240 145 164 146	F0 91 A4 92	234 162 152	EA A2 98	234 168 141	EA A8 8D
UTF-16	3489	0DA1	55300 56589	D804 DD0D	6497	1961	55301 57099	D805 DF0B	55302 56594	D806 DD12	43160	A898	43533	AA0D
Numeric character reference	&#3489;	&#xDA1;	&#69901;	&#x1110D;	&#6497;	&#x1961;	&#71435;	&#x1170B;	&#71954;	&#x11912;	&#43160;	&#xA898;	&#43533;	&#xAA0D;

Character information
Preview	𑘔		𑦴		𑩢		ꠍ		𑵼			
Unicode name	MODI LETTER CHA		NANDINAGARI LETTER CHA		SOYOMBO LETTER CHA		SYLOTI NAGRI LETTER CHO		GUNJALA GONDI LETTER CHA		KAITHI LETTER CHA	
Encodings	decimal	hex	dec	hex	dec	hex	dec	hex	dec	hex	dec	hex
Unicode	71188	U+11614	72116	U+119B4	72290	U+11A62	43021	U+A80D	73084	U+11D7C	69779	U+11093
UTF-8	240 145 152 148	F0 91 98 94	240 145 166 180	F0 91 A6 B4	240 145 169 162	F0 91 A9 A2	234 160 141	EA A0 8D	240 145 181 188	F0 91 B5 BC	240 145 130 147	F0 91 82 93
UTF-16	55301 56852	D805 DE14	55302 56756	D806 DDB4	55302 56930	D806 DE62	43021	A80D	55303 56700	D807 DD7C	55300 56467	D804 DC93
Numeric character reference	&#71188;	&#x11614;	&#72116;	&#x119B4;	&#72290;	&#x11A62;	&#43021;	&#xA80D;	&#73084;	&#x11D7C;	&#69779;	&#x11093;

Character information
Preview	𑒕		ᰇ		ᤇ		𑱷	
Unicode name	TIRHUTA LETTER CHA		LEPCHA LETTER CHA		LIMBU LETTER CHA		MARCHEN LETTER CHA	
Encodings	decimal	hex	dec	hex	dec	hex	dec	hex
Unicode	70805	U+11495	7175	U+1C07	6407	U+1907	72823	U+11C77
UTF-8	240 145 146 149	F0 91 92 95	225 176 135	E1 B0 87	225 164 135	E1 A4 87	240 145 177 183	F0 91 B1 B7
UTF-16	55301 56469	D805 DC95	7175	1C07	6407	1907	55303 56439	D807 DC77
Numeric character reference	&#70805;	&#x11495;	&#7175;	&#x1C07;	&#6407;	&#x1907;	&#72823;	&#x11C77;

Character information
Preview	𑚐		𑠐		𑈏		𑋁		𑅚		𑊋	
Unicode name	TAKRI LETTER CHA		DOGRA LETTER CHA		KHOJKI LETTER CHA		KHUDAWADI LETTER CHA		MAHAJANI LETTER CHA		MULTANI LETTER CHA	
Encodings	decimal	hex	dec	hex	dec	hex	dec	hex	dec	hex	dec	hex
Unicode	71312	U+11690	71696	U+11810	70159	U+1120F	70337	U+112C1	69978	U+1115A	70283	U+1128B
UTF-8	240 145 154 144	F0 91 9A 90	240 145 160 144	F0 91 A0 90	240 145 136 143	F0 91 88 8F	240 145 139 129	F0 91 8B 81	240 145 133 154	F0 91 85 9A	240 145 138 139	F0 91 8A 8B
UTF-16	55301 56976	D805 DE90	55302 56336	D806 DC10	55300 56847	D804 DE0F	55300 57025	D804 DEC1	55300 56666	D804 DD5A	55300 56971	D804 DE8B
Numeric character reference	&#71312;	&#x11690;	&#71696;	&#x11810;	&#70159;	&#x1120F;	&#70337;	&#x112C1;	&#69978;	&#x1115A;	&#70283;	&#x1128B;

Character information
Preview	ᬙ		ꦖ	
Unicode name	BALINESE LETTER CA LACA		JAVANESE LETTER CA MURDA	
Encodings	decimal	hex	dec	hex
Unicode	6937	U+1B19	43414	U+A996
UTF-8	225 172 153	E1 AC 99	234 166 150	EA A6 96
Numeric character reference	&#6937;	&#x1B19;	&#43414;	&#xA996;

Character information
Preview	𑴒	
Unicode name	MASARAM GONDI LETTER CHA	
Encodings	decimal	hex
Unicode	72978	U+11D12
UTF-8	240 145 180 146	F0 91 B4 92
UTF-16	55303 56594	D807 DD12
Numeric character reference	&#72978;	&#x11D12;

== See also ==
- Qoph
