= Sunda =

Sunda may refer to:

== Europe ==
- Sunda, Faroe Islands

== India ==
- Sunda (asura), an asura brother of Upasunda
- Sunda (clan), a clan (gotra) of Jats in Haryana and Rajasthan, India

== Southeast Asia ==
- Sundanese (disambiguation)
  - Sundanese people
  - Sundanese language
  - Sundanese script
  - Sundanese (Unicode block)
- Sunda Kingdom, a kingdom that existed in west part of Java island from the 7th century to the 16th century
- Kidung Sunda, a literary work that recounts the story of the "Battle of Bubat" between Sundanese and Javanese
- Sunda Kelapa, the old port of Jakarta located on the estuarine of Ciliwung River, the main port of the Sunda Kingdom
- Mount Sunda, an ancient extinct supervolcano that once existed in Priangan highland during Pleistocene age, the predecessor of Tangkuban Perahu, Burangrang, and Bukit Tunggul volcanoes
- Sunda Strait, the strait between Java and Sumatra
- Sunda Islands, a group of islands located in Maritime Southeast Asia
  - Greater Sunda Islands
  - Lesser Sunda Islands
- Sunda Shelf, part of the continental shelf of Southeast Asia, covered by the South China Sea which isolates islands such as Borneo, Sumatra and Java
- Sunda Trench, is an oceanic trench located in the Indian Ocean near Sumatra, formed where the Australian-Capricorn plates subduct under a part of the Eurasian Plate.
- Sunda Arc, volcanic arc that produced the volcanoes that form the topographic spine of the islands of Sumatra, Nusa Tenggara, and Java, the Sunda Strait and the Lesser Sunda Islands.
- Sundaland, a biogeographical region that comprises the Malay Peninsula and the Indonesian Archipelago islands west of the Wallace Line
