= Sundanese Supplement =

- Range: U+1CC0..U+1CCF (16 code points)
- Plane: BMP
- Scripts: Sundanese
- Symbol sets: Sundanese punctuation
- Assigned: 8 code points
- Unused: 8 reserved code points

Unicode version history
- 6.1 (2012): 8 (+8)

Unicode documentation
- Code chart ∣ Web page

Sundanese Supplement is a Unicode block containing punctuation characters for Sundanese.

Sundanese Supplement^{[1]}^{[2]} Official Unicode Consortium code chart (PDF)
	0	1	2	3	4	5	6	7	8	9	A	B	C	D	E	F
U+1CCx	᳀	᳁	᳂	᳃	᳄	᳅	᳆	᳇								
Notes: 1. As of Unicode version 16.0; 2. Grey areas indicate non-assigned code points

== History ==
The following Unicode-related documents record the purpose and process of defining specific characters in the Sundanese Supplement block:

Version	Final code points (Note: Proposed code points and characters names may differ from final code points and names)	Count	L2 ID	WG2 ID	Document
6.1	U+1CC0..1CC7	8	L2/09-190	N3648	Everson, Michael (2009-05-05), Preliminary proposal for encoding additional Sundanese characters for Old Sundanese
6.1	U+1CC0..1CC7	8	L2/09-225R		Moore, Lisa (2009-08-17), "C.7", UTC #120 / L2 #217 Minutes
6.1	U+1CC0..1CC7	8	L2/09-251R	N3666R	Everson, Michael (2009-09-05), Proposal for encoding additional Sundanese characters for Old Sundanese
6.1	U+1CC0..1CC7	8		N3703 (pdf, doc)	Umamaheswaran, V. S. (2010-04-13), "M55.22", Unconfirmed minutes of WG 2 meeting no. 55, Tokyo 2009-10-26/30
6.1	U+1CC0..1CC7	8	L2/10-143	N3836	Anderson, Deborah (2010-04-23), Correction to 3 character names in the Sundanese Supplement block
6.1	U+1CC0..1CC7	8	L2/10-108		Moore, Lisa (2010-05-19), "Consensus 123-C6", UTC #123 / L2 #220 Minutes, "Accept the three Sundanese revised names for 1CC4, 1CC5, 1CC7..."
6.1	U+1CC0..1CC7	8		N3803 (pdf, doc)	"M56.08k", Unconfirmed minutes of WG 2 meeting no. 56, 2010-09-24
