= Sundanese numerals =

Sundanese number system

Sundanese numerals (Sundanese language: Wilangan) is a number system used by Sundanese people and contains a sequence of 10 digits (᮰ ᮱ ᮲ ᮳ ᮴ ᮵ ᮶ ᮷ ᮸ ᮹) in Sundanese script. The Wilangan writing system is the same as in Arabic numerals, i.e. the writing is directed to the right, only there is a difference in terms of marking, namely that the writing of numbers in Sundanese script must use a pipe sign ( | ), because some forms of Sundanese numerals are similar to consonant letters (ᮍᮜᮌᮦᮔ ngalagéna), it is feared that ambiguity will occur.

Example: |᮲᮰᮲᮶| = 2026

However, because the writing system that is more often used in Sundanese is the Latin alphabet, it is more common to write numbers in Sundanese using Arabic numerals and the use of numbers in Sundanese script is optional.

== Basic numbering in Sundanese ==
Some numbers in Sundanese have more than one different way of pronouncing the number, for example in the tweens, the way of pronouncing the numbers 21–29 can also use lilikuran.

Examples of Writing and Mentioning:

Unit						Teens			
Symbol		Written				Symbol		Written	
Wilangan	Arabic numerals	Sundanese script		Latin alphabet		Wilangan	Arabic numerals	Sundanese script	Latin alphabet
᮰	0	ᮈᮔᮧᮜ᮪		enol		-	-	-	-
᮱	1	ᮠᮤᮏᮤ		hiji		᮱᮱	11	ᮞᮘᮨᮜᮞ᮪	sabelas
᮲	2	ᮓᮥᮃ		dua		᮱᮲	12	ᮓᮥᮃ ᮘᮨᮜᮞ᮪	dua belas
᮳	3	ᮒᮤᮜᮥ		tilu		᮱᮳	13	ᮒᮤᮜᮥ ᮘᮨᮜᮞ᮪	tilu belas
᮴	4	ᮇᮕᮒ᮪		opat		᮱᮴	14	ᮇᮕᮒ᮪ ᮘᮨᮜᮞ᮪	opat belas
᮵	5	ᮜᮤᮙ		lima		᮱᮵	15	ᮜᮤᮙ ᮘᮨᮜᮞ᮪	lima belas
᮶	6	ᮌᮨᮔᮨᮕ᮪		genep		᮱᮶	16	ᮌᮨᮔᮨᮕ᮪ ᮘᮨᮜᮞ᮪	genep belas
᮷	7	ᮒᮥᮏᮥᮂ		tujuh		᮱᮷	17	ᮒᮥᮏᮥᮂ ᮘᮨᮜᮞ᮪	tujuh belas
᮸	8	ᮓᮜᮕᮔ᮪		dalapan		᮱᮹	18	ᮓᮜᮕᮔ᮪ ᮘᮨᮜᮞ᮪	dalapan belas
᮹	9	ᮞᮜᮕᮔ᮪		salapan		᮱᮹	19	ᮞᮜᮕᮔ᮪ ᮘᮨᮜᮞ᮪	salapan belas
Tweens						Tens			
Symbol		Written				Symbol		Written	
Wilangan	Arabic numerals	Sundanese script		Latin alphabet		Wilangan	Arabic numerals	Sundanese script	Latin alphabet
Wilangan	Arabic numerals	Sundanese script		Native Sundanese	Lilikuran	Wilangan	Arabic numerals	Sundanese script	Latin alphabet
Wilangan	Arabic numerals	Native Sundanese	Lilikuran	Native Sundanese	Lilikuran	Wilangan	Arabic numerals	Sundanese script	Latin alphabet
᮲᮱	21	ᮓᮥᮃ ᮕᮥᮜᮥᮂ ᮠᮤᮏᮤ	ᮞᮜᮤᮊᮥᮁ	dua puluh hiji	salikur	᮱᮰	10	ᮞᮕᮥᮜᮥᮂ	sapuluh
᮲᮲	22	ᮓᮥᮃ ᮕᮥᮜᮥᮂ ᮓᮥᮃ	ᮓᮥᮃ ᮜᮤᮊᮥᮁ	dua puluh dua	dua likur	᮲᮰	20	ᮓᮥᮃᮕᮥᮜᮥᮂ	dua puluh
᮲᮳	23	ᮓᮥᮃ ᮕᮥᮜᮥᮂ ᮒᮤᮜᮥ	ᮒᮤᮜᮥ ᮜᮤᮊᮥᮁ	dua puluh tilu	tilu likur	᮳᮰	30	ᮒᮤᮜᮥᮕᮥᮜᮥᮂ	tilu puluh
᮲᮴	24	ᮓᮥᮃ ᮕᮥᮜᮥᮂ ᮇᮕᮒ᮪	ᮇᮕᮒ᮪ ᮜᮤᮊᮥᮁ	dua puluh opat	opat likur	᮴᮰	40	ᮇᮕᮒ᮪ᮕᮥᮜᮥᮂ/ᮞᮛᮏᮥ	opat puluh/saraju
᮲᮵	25	ᮓᮥᮃ ᮕᮥᮜᮥᮂ ᮜᮤᮙ	ᮜᮤᮙ ᮜᮤᮊᮥᮁ/ᮞᮜᮦᮝ	dua puluh lima	lima likur/salawé	᮵᮰	50	ᮜᮤᮙᮕᮥᮜᮅᮂ/ᮞᮦᮊᮒ᮪	lima puluh/sékat
᮲᮶	26	ᮓᮥᮃ ᮕᮥᮜᮥᮂ ᮌᮨᮔᮨᮕ᮪	ᮌᮨᮔᮨᮕ᮪ ᮜᮤᮊᮥᮁ	dua puluh genep	genep likur	᮶᮰	60	ᮌᮨᮔᮨᮕ᮪ᮕᮥᮜᮥᮂ/ᮞᮝᮤᮓᮊ᮪	genep puluh/sawidak
᮲᮷	27	ᮓᮥᮃ ᮕᮥᮜᮥᮂ ᮒᮥᮏᮥᮂ	ᮒᮥᮏᮥᮂ ᮜᮄᮊᮥᮁ	dua puluh tujuh	tujuh likur	᮷᮰	70	ᮒᮥᮏᮥᮂᮕᮥᮜᮥᮂ	tujuh puluh
᮲᮷	27	ᮓᮥᮃ ᮕᮥᮜᮥᮂ ᮒᮥᮏᮥᮂ	ᮒᮥᮏᮥᮂ ᮜᮄᮊᮥᮁ	dua puluh tujuh	tujuh likur	᮷᮵	75	ᮒᮥᮏᮥᮂ ᮕᮥᮜᮥᮂ ᮜᮤᮙ/ᮜᮨᮘᮊ᮪ ᮞᮒᮥᮞ᮪	tujuh puluh lima/lebak satus
᮲᮸	28	ᮓᮥᮃ ᮕᮥᮜᮥᮂ ᮓᮜᮕᮔ᮪	ᮓᮜᮕᮔ᮪ ᮜᮄᮊᮥᮁ	dua puluh dalapan	dalapan likur	᮸᮰	80	ᮓᮜᮕᮔ᮪ᮕᮥᮜᮥᮂ	dalapan puluh
᮲᮹	29	ᮓᮥᮃ ᮕᮥᮜᮥᮂ ᮞᮜᮕᮔ᮪	ᮞᮜᮕᮔ᮪ ᮜᮤᮊᮥᮁ	dua puluh salapan	salapan likur	᮹᮰	90	ᮞᮜᮕᮔ᮪ᮕᮥᮜᮥᮂ	salapan puluh

=== Hundreds ===
- 100 – |᮱᮰᮰| – saratus
- 175 – |᮸᮲᮰| – saratus tujuh puluh lima/lebak satak
- 200 – |᮲᮰᮰| – dua ratus
- 300 – |᮳᮰᮰| – tilu ratus
- 375 – |᮳᮷᮵| – tilu ratus tujuh puluh lima/lebak samas
- 400 – |᮴᮰᮰| – opat ratus, samas
- 500 – |᮵᮰᮰| – lima ratus
- 600 – |᮶᮰᮰| – genep ratus
- 705 – |᮷᮰᮵| – tujuh ratus lima
- 800 – |᮸᮰᮰| – dalapan ratus/domas
- 820 – |᮸᮲᮰| – dalapan ratus dua puluh
- 999 – |᮹᮹᮹| – salapan ratus salapan puluh salapan

=== Thousands ===
- 1.000 – |᮳᮰᮰᮰| – sarébu
- 2.000 – |᮲᮰᮰᮰| – dua rébu
- 3.007 – |᮳᮰᮰᮷| – tilu rébu tujuh
- 4.010 – |᮴᮰᮱᮰| – opat rébu sapuluh
- 5.500 – |᮵᮵᮰᮰| – lima rébu lima ratus
- 6.708 – |᮶᮷᮰᮸| – genep rébu tujuh ratus dalapan
- 7.880 – |᮷᮸᮸᮰| – tujuh rébu dalapan ratus dalapan puluh
- 9.999 – |᮹᮹᮹᮹| – salapan rébu salapan ratus salapan puluh salapan

=== Tens of thousands ===
- 10.000 – |᮱᮰᮰᮰᮰| – sapuluh rébu/salaksa
- 15.000 – |᮱᮵᮰᮰᮰| – lima belas rébu/limalas rébu
- 25.000 – |᮲᮵᮰᮰᮰| – dua puluh lima rébu/salawé rébu
- 50.000 – |᮵᮰᮰᮰᮰| – lima puluh rébu
- 99.999 – |᮹᮹᮹᮹᮹| – salapan puluh salapan rébu salapan ratus salapan puluh salapan

=== Hundreds of thousands ===
- 100.000 – |᮱᮰᮰ ᮰᮰᮰| – saratus rébu/saketi
- 500.000 – |᮵᮰᮰ ᮰᮰᮰| – lima ratus rébu
- 725.160 – |᮷᮲᮵ ᮱᮶᮰| – tujuh ratus dua puluh lima rébu saratus genep puluh
- 999.999 – |᮹᮹᮹ ᮹᮹᮹| – salapan ratus salapan puluh salapan rébu salapan ratus salapan puluh salapan

=== Millions ===
- 1.000.000 – |᮱ ᮰᮰᮰ ᮰᮰᮰| – sajuta/sapuluh keti
- 5.000.000 – |᮵ ᮰᮰᮰ ᮰᮰᮰| – lima yuta
- 6.486.417 – |᮶ ᮴᮸᮶ ᮴᮱᮷| – genep yuta opat ratus dalapan puluh genep rébu opat ratus tujuh belas
- 9.999.999 – |᮹ ᮹᮹᮹ ᮹᮹᮹| – salapan juta salapan ratus salapan puluh salapan rébu salapan ratus salapan puluh salapan
