= Balinese (Unicode block) =

- Range: U+1B00..U+1B7F (128 code points)
- Plane: BMP
- Scripts: Balinese
- Major alphabets: aksara Bali
- Assigned: 127 code points
- Unused: 1 reserved code points

Unicode version history
- 5.0 (2006): 121 (+121)
- 14.0 (2021): 124 (+3)
- 16.0 (2024): 127 (+3)

Unicode documentation
- Code chart ∣ Web page

Balinese is a Unicode block containing characters of Balinese script for the Balinese language. Balinese language is mainly spoken on the island of Bali, Indonesia.

== Block ==
Balinese^{[1]}^{[2]} Official Unicode Consortium code chart (PDF)
| | 0 | 1 | 2 | 3 | 4 | 5 | 6 | 7 | 8 | 9 | A | B | C | D | E | F |
| U+1B0x | ᬀ | ᬁ | ᬂ | ᬃ | ᬄ | ᬅ | ᬆ | ᬇ | ᬈ | ᬉ | ᬊ | ᬋ | ᬌ | ᬍ | ᬎ | ᬏ |
| U+1B1x | ᬐ | ᬑ | ᬒ | ᬓ | ᬔ | ᬕ | ᬖ | ᬗ | ᬘ | ᬙ | ᬚ | ᬛ | ᬜ | ᬝ | ᬞ | ᬟ |
| U+1B2x | ᬠ | ᬡ | ᬢ | ᬣ | ᬤ | ᬥ | ᬦ | ᬧ | ᬨ | ᬩ | ᬪ | ᬫ | ᬬ | ᬭ | ᬮ | ᬯ |
| U+1B3x | ᬰ | ᬱ | ᬲ | ᬳ | ᬴ | ᬵ | ᬶ | ᬷ | ᬸ | ᬹ | ᬺ | ᬻ | ᬼ | ᬽ | ᬾ | ᬿ |
| U+1B4x | ᭀ | ᭁ | ᭂ | ᭃ | ᭄ | ᭅ | ᭆ | ᭇ | ᭈ | ᭉ | ᭊ | ᭋ | ᭌ | | ᭎ | ᭏ |
| U+1B5x | ᭐ | ᭑ | ᭒ | ᭓ | ᭔ | ᭕ | ᭖ | ᭗ | ᭘ | ᭙ | ᭚ | ᭛ | ᭜ | ᭝ | ᭞ | ᭟ |
| U+1B6x | ᭠ | ᭡ | ᭢ | ᭣ | ᭤ | ᭥ | ᭦ | ᭧ | ᭨ | ᭩ | ᭪ | ᭫ | ᭬ | ᭭ | ᭮ | ᭯ |
| U+1B7x | ᭰ | ᭱ | ᭲ | ᭳ | ᭴ | ᭵ | ᭶ | ᭷ | ᭸ | ᭹ | ᭺ | ᭻ | ᭼ | ᭽ | ᭾ | ᭿ |
Notes: 1. As of Unicode version 16.0; 2. Grey area indicates non-assigned code point

== History ==
The following Unicode-related documents record the purpose and process of defining specific characters in the Balinese block:

| Version | Final code points (Note: Proposed code points and characters names may differ from final code points and names) | Count | L2 ID | WG2 ID | Document |
|---|---|---|---|---|---|
| 5.0 | U+1B00..1B4B, 1B50..1B7C | 121 | L2/03-118 | | Sudewa, Ida Bagus Adi (2003-03-12), Contemporary Use of The Balinese Script |
| 5.0 | U+1B00..1B4B, 1B50..1B7C | 121 | L2/03-153 | | Four letters in support of Balinese encoding, 2003-05-13 |
| 5.0 | U+1B00..1B4B, 1B50..1B7C | 121 | L2/03-156 | | Darmasuta, Ida Bagus (2003-05-13), Letter in support of Balinese encoding from Dept of National Education, Language Center, Denapasar Language Council |
| 5.0 | U+1B00..1B4B, 1B50..1B7C | 121 | L2/03-152 | | Two letters in support of Balinese encoding, 2003-05-14 |
| 5.0 | U+1B00..1B4B, 1B50..1B7C | 121 | L2/04-357 | N2856 | Everson, Michael (2004-10-04), Preliminary proposal for encoding the Balinese script in the UCS |
| 5.0 | U+1B00..1B4B, 1B50..1B7C | 121 | L2/05-021R | N2916 | Everson, Michael (2005-01-19), Letter of support from Balinese Government |
| 5.0 | U+1B00..1B4B, 1B50..1B7C | 121 | L2/05-008 | N2908 | Everson, Michael; Suatjana, I. Made (2005-01-23), Proposal for encoding the Balinese script in the UCS |
| 5.0 | U+1B00..1B4B, 1B50..1B7C | 121 | L2/05-056 | | Constable, Peter (2005-02-01), Comments on Balinese Proposal, L2/05-008 |
| 5.0 | U+1B00..1B4B, 1B50..1B7C | 121 | L2/05-059 | | Whistler, Ken (2005-02-03), "3. Balinese", WG2 Consent Docket, Part 2: Unicode 5.0 Issues |
| 5.0 | U+1B00..1B4B, 1B50..1B7C | 121 | L2/05-090 | | McGowan, Rick (2005-04-14), Proposed Balinese Character Properties |
| 5.0 | U+1B00..1B4B, 1B50..1B7C | 121 | L2/05-091 | | McGowan, Rick (2005-04-14), Proposed Balinese Line-Breaking Classes |
| 5.0 | U+1B00..1B4B, 1B50..1B7C | 121 | L2/05-026 | | Moore, Lisa (2005-05-16), "Balinese (C.1), WG2 - Unicode 5.0 Consent Docket (B.1.16)", UTC #102 Minutes |
| 5.0 | U+1B00..1B4B, 1B50..1B7C | 121 | L2/05-234 | N2974 | Hanafiah, T. A. R. (2005-08-16), Letter from Badan Standardisasi Nasional (BSN Indonesia) re Balinese |
| 5.0 | U+1B00..1B4B, 1B50..1B7C | 121 | L2/05-108R | | Moore, Lisa (2005-08-26), "Balinese (C.1)", UTC #103 Minutes |
| 5.0 | U+1B00..1B4B, 1B50..1B7C | 121 | L2/06-108 | | Moore, Lisa (2006-05-25), "Balinese Decompositions (B.14.1)", UTC #107 Minutes |
| 5.0 | U+1B00..1B4B, 1B50..1B7C | 121 | L2/18-274 | | McGowan, Rick (2018-09-14), "Grapheme_Cluster_Break of U+1B35 BALINESE VOWEL SIGN TEDUNG", Comments on Public Review Issues (July 24 - Sept 14, 2018) |
| 5.0 | U+1B00..1B4B, 1B50..1B7C | 121 | L2/18-272 | | Moore, Lisa (2018-10-29), "Consensus 157-C14", UTC #157 Minutes, "Change the Grapheme_Cluster_Break property of U+1B35 BALINESE VOWEL SIGN TEDUNG from Spacing_Mark to Extend, for Unicode 12.0." |
| 14.0 | U+1B4C | 1 | L2/19-259 | | Yang, Ben; Perdana, Aditya Bayu (2019-07-10), Proposal to encode Balinese Archaic Jnya |
| 14.0 | U+1B4C | 1 | L2/19-286 | | Anderson, Deborah; Whistler, Ken; Pournader, Roozbeh; Moore, Lisa; Liang, Hai (2019-07-22), "11. Balinese", Recommendations to UTC #160 July 2019 on Script Proposals |
| 14.0 | U+1B4C | 1 | L2/19-270 | | Moore, Lisa (2019-10-07), "C.13 Proposal to encode Balinese archaic jnya", UTC #160 Minutes |
| 14.0 | U+1B7D..1B7E | 2 | L2/19-318 | | Yang, Ben; Perdana, Aditya Bayu (2019-09-27), Proposal to encode two Balinese punctuation marks |
| 14.0 | U+1B7D..1B7E | 2 | L2/19-343 | | Anderson, Deborah; Whistler, Ken; Pournader, Roozbeh; Moore, Lisa; Liang, Hai (2019-10-06), "15. Balinese", Recommendations to UTC #161 October 2019 on Script Proposals |
| 14.0 | U+1B7D..1B7E | 2 | L2/19-323 | | Moore, Lisa (2019-10-01), "D.2 Proposal to encode two Balinese punctuation marks", UTC #161 Minutes |
| 16.0 | U+1B4E..1B4F, 1B7F | 3 | L2/22-059 | | Sh., Rikza F.; Perdana, Aditya Bayu (January 2022), Proposal to Encode Three Balinese Punctuation Marks |
| 16.0 | U+1B4E..1B4F, 1B7F | 3 | L2/22-068 | | Anderson, Deborah; Whistler, Ken; Pournader, Roozbeh; Constable, Peter (2022-04-15), "8 Balinese", Recommendations to UTC #171 April 2022 on Script Proposals |
| 16.0 | U+1B4E..1B4F, 1B7F | 3 | L2/22-061 | | Constable, Peter (2022-07-27), "D.1 Section 8", Approved Minutes of UTC Meeting 171 |

== See also ==
- Javanese (Unicode block)
- Sundanese (Unicode block)
