= Javanese (Unicode block) =

- Range: U+A980..U+A9DF (96 code points)
- Plane: BMP
- Scripts: Javanese (90 char.); Common (1 char.)
- Major alphabets: Aksara Jawa
- Assigned: 91 code points
- Unused: 5 reserved code points

Unicode version history
- 5.2 (2009): 91 (+91)

Unicode documentation
- Code chart ∣ Web page

Javanese is a Unicode block containing aksara Jawa characters traditionally used for writing the Javanese language.

== Block ==
The Unicode block for Javanese is U+A980–U+A9DF. There are 91 code points for Javanese script: 53 letters, 19 punctuation marks, 10 numbers, and 9 vowels:

Javanese^{[1]}^{[2]} Official Unicode Consortium code chart (PDF)
	0	1	2	3	4	5	6	7	8	9	A	B	C	D	E	F
U+A98x	ꦀ	ꦁ	ꦂ	ꦃ	ꦄ	ꦅ	ꦆ	ꦇ	ꦈ	ꦉ	ꦊ	ꦋ	ꦌ	ꦍ	ꦎ	ꦏ
U+A99x	ꦐ	ꦑ	ꦒ	ꦓ	ꦔ	ꦕ	ꦖ	ꦗ	ꦘ	ꦙ	ꦚ	ꦛ	ꦜ	ꦝ	ꦞ	ꦟ
U+A9Ax	ꦠ	ꦡ	ꦢ	ꦣ	ꦤ	ꦥ	ꦦ	ꦧ	ꦨ	ꦩ	ꦪ	ꦫ	ꦬ	ꦭ	ꦮ	ꦯ
U+A9Bx	ꦰ	ꦱ	ꦲ	꦳	ꦴ	ꦵ	ꦶ	ꦷ	ꦸ	ꦹ	ꦺ	ꦻ	ꦼ	ꦽ	ꦾ	ꦿ
U+A9Cx	꧀	꧁	꧂	꧃	꧄	꧅	꧆	꧇	꧈	꧉	꧊	꧋	꧌	꧍		ꧏ
U+A9Dx	꧐	꧑	꧒	꧓	꧔	꧕	꧖	꧗	꧘	꧙					꧞	꧟
Notes: 1. As of Unicode version 16.0; 2. Grey areas indicate non-assigned code points

== History ==
The following Unicode-related documents record the purpose and process of defining specific characters in the Javanese block:

Version	Final code points (Note: Proposed code points and characters names may differ from final code points and names)	Count	L2 ID	WG2 ID	Document
5.2	U+A980..A9CD, A9CF..A9D9, A9DE..A9DF	91	L2/98-041		Hellingman, Jeroen (1997-05-19), Javanese Proposal
5.2	U+A980..A9CD, A9CF..A9D9, A9DE..A9DF	91	L2/98-070		Aliprand, Joan; Winkler, Arnold, "3.D.1", Minutes of the joint UTC and L2 meeting from the meeting in Cupertino, February 25-27, 1998
5.2	U+A980..A9CD, A9CF..A9D9, A9DE..A9DF	91	L2/06-080		Sayoga, Teguh Budi (2006-03-13), Proposal for encoding the Javanese Script in the UCS (A900-A97F)
5.2	U+A980..A9CD, A9CF..A9D9, A9DE..A9DF	91	L2/07-232R2	N3292R2	Everson, Michael (2007-07-31), Preliminary proposal for encoding the Javanese script in the UCS
5.2	U+A980..A9CD, A9CF..A9D9, A9DE..A9DF	91	L2/07-237		Pentzlin, Karl (2007-07-31), Comment on L2/07-232 - Suggestion to encode Javanese in the SMP
5.2	U+A980..A9CD, A9CF..A9D9, A9DE..A9DF	91	L2/07-248		Anderson, Deborah (2007-08-01), Re L2/07-237 Comment on L2/07-232 Suggestion to encode Javanese in the SMP
5.2	U+A980..A9CD, A9CF..A9D9, A9DE..A9DF	91	L2/07-295	N3319R	Everson, Michael (2007-09-11), Proposal for encoding the Javanese script in the UCS
5.2	U+A980..A9CD, A9CF..A9D9, A9DE..A9DF	91	L2/07-298	N3329	Everson, Michael (2007-09-11), Javanese government support for encoding the Javanese script
5.2	U+A980..A9CD, A9CF..A9D9, A9DE..A9DF	91	L2/08-003		Moore, Lisa (2008-02-14), "Javanese", UTC #114 Minutes
5.2	U+A980..A9CD, A9CF..A9D9, A9DE..A9DF	91	L2/08-015R	N3319R3	Everson, Michael (2008-03-06), Proposal for encoding the Javanese script in the UCS
5.2	U+A980..A9CD, A9CF..A9D9, A9DE..A9DF	91	L2/08-318	N3453 (pdf, doc)	Umamaheswaran, V. S. (2008-08-13), "M52.7", Unconfirmed minutes of WG 2 meeting 52
5.2	U+A980..A9CD, A9CF..A9D9, A9DE..A9DF	91	L2/09-122	N3613	Anderson, Deborah (2009-04-10), Name correction for FPDAM 6: Javanese A9C0 JAVANESE PANGKON
5.2	U+A980..A9CD, A9CF..A9D9, A9DE..A9DF	91	L2/09-234	N3603 (pdf, doc)	Umamaheswaran, V. S. (2009-07-08), "M54.03a", Unconfirmed minutes of WG 2 meeting 54
5.2	U+A980..A9CD, A9CF..A9D9, A9DE..A9DF	91	L2/09-104		Moore, Lisa (2009-05-20), "Consensus 119-C19", UTC #119 / L2 #216 Minutes, "Approve the name changes in section A, B, and C of document L2/09-177... [U+A9C0]"
5.2	U+A980..A9CD, A9CF..A9D9, A9DE..A9DF	91	L2/09-350		Whistler, Ken (2009-10-21), Property Correction for U+A9B3 Javanese Sign Cecak Telu
5.2	U+A980..A9CD, A9CF..A9D9, A9DE..A9DF	91	L2/16-327		McGowan, Rick (2016-11-07), "Incorrect Indic positional category for Javanese consonant sign cakra", Comments on Public Review Issues (July 27 - Nov 7, 2016)
5.2	U+A980..A9CD, A9CF..A9D9, A9DE..A9DF	91	L2/17-037		Anderson, Deborah; Whistler, Ken; Pournader, Roozbeh; Glass, Andrew; Iancu, Laurențiu; Moore, Lisa; Liang, Hai; Ishida, Richard; Misra, Karan; McGowan, Rick (2017-01-21), "11. Javanese", Recommendations to UTC #150 January 2017 on Script Proposals
5.2	U+A980..A9CD, A9CF..A9D9, A9DE..A9DF	91	L2/17-038		Lindenberg, Norbert (2017-01-21), Indic positional category for Javanese cakra
5.2	U+A980..A9CD, A9CF..A9D9, A9DE..A9DF	91	L2/17-016		Moore, Lisa (2017-02-08), "B.14.5 Indic positional category for Javanese cakra", UTC #150 Minutes
5.2	U+A980..A9CD, A9CF..A9D9, A9DE..A9DF	91	L2/17-163		Pournader, Roozbeh (2017-05-09), Indic Syllabic Category of Javanese Cakra
5.2	U+A980..A9CD, A9CF..A9D9, A9DE..A9DF	91	L2/17-103		Moore, Lisa (2017-05-18), "B.14.7 Indic positional category of Javanese Cakra", UTC #151 Minutes
5.2	U+A980..A9CD, A9CF..A9D9, A9DE..A9DF	91	L2/19-003		Liang, Hai; Perdana, Aditya Bayu (2019-01-04), Suspicious identity of U+A9B5 JAVANESE VOWEL SIGN TOLONG
5.2	U+A980..A9CD, A9CF..A9D9, A9DE..A9DF	91	L2/19-004		Liang, Hai; Perdana, Aditya Bayu (2019-01-04), Properties of U+A9BD JAVANESE CONSONANT SIGN KERET
5.2	U+A980..A9CD, A9CF..A9D9, A9DE..A9DF	91	L2/19-047		Anderson, Deborah; et al. (2019-01-13), "16.a. Javanese Consonant sign Keret, 16.b. Javanese Vowel sign Tolong", Recommendations to UTC #158 January 2019 on Script Proposals
5.2	U+A980..A9CD, A9CF..A9D9, A9DE..A9DF	91	L2/19-008		Moore, Lisa (2019-02-08), "B.14.1 Properties of U+A9BD JAVANESE CONSONANT SIGN KERET, C.4 Suspicious identity of U+A9B5 JAVANESE VOWEL SIGN TOLONG", UTC #158 Minutes
5.2	U+A980..A9CD, A9CF..A9D9, A9DE..A9DF	91	L2/19-083		Lindenberg, Norbert; Perdana, Aditya Bayu (2019-03-22), Positional category of Javanese pengkal
5.2	U+A980..A9CD, A9CF..A9D9, A9DE..A9DF	91	L2/19-173		Anderson, Deborah; et al. (2019-04-29), "17. Javanese", Recommendations to UTC #159 April-May 2019 on Script Proposals
5.2	U+A980..A9CD, A9CF..A9D9, A9DE..A9DF	91	L2/19-122		Moore, Lisa (2019-05-08), "B.13.1 Positional category of Javanese pengkal", UTC #159 Minutes

== See also ==
- Balinese (Unicode block)
- Sundanese (Unicode block)
