= Sundet (Hordaland) =

Small bay in Vestland county, Norway

Coordinates: 60.6054°N 5.0788°E

Sundet is a very small bay along the Radfjorden in Alver Municipality in Vestland county, Norway. It is just north of the city of Bergen. The bay is located between the islands of Holsnøy and Radøy, along the small island of Bongno.
