= Lenny Sund =

Personal information
- Born: September 10, 1904
- Died: September 22, 1972 (aged 68) Wilmington, Delaware, U.S.
- Weight: Flyweight

Boxing career

Boxing record
- Total fights: 180
- Wins: 178
- Losses: 2

Leonard Sund (September 10, 1904 – September 22, 1972) was an American professional boxer who competed from c. 1918 to 1928. He was inducted into the Delaware Sports Museum and Hall of Fame in 1998.

== Boxing career ==
A native of Delaware, Sund started a professional boxing career at the age of 14, after being matched up by local promoters against the bantamweight fighter Willie Griffith. Sund defeated him, and his career "soared from that point." He was "all over Griffith in the first two rounds and stopped him in the third," and Griffith's only comment on the fight was that Sund "was too much for me." Sund fought out of the Keystone Club and later the Cambria Club, going undefeated in his first four years. His first and only two losses came by close decisions in 1922, one of which came against the flyweight champion of the Philippines. On October 5, 1925, he was named the state flyweight champion after defeating Mickey Morris by decision. After compiling a 178–2 record in ten years, Sund retired.

== Later life and death ==
After his boxing career, Sund worked as an interior decorator, and, according to customers, was "one of the fastest paper hangers in the business."

Sund died on September 22, 1972, in Wilmington following a long illness. He was 68 at the time of his death.

Through the efforts of his brother Walter, Sund was inducted into the Delaware Sports Museum and Hall of Fame in 1998. His brother Al was inducted four years prior.
