= Al Sund =

American boxer (1902–1951)

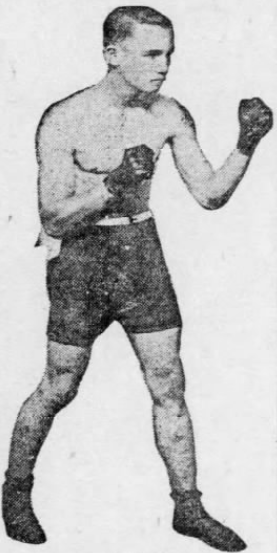

Personal information
- Nicknames: Kid Sunn, Marty Sullivan
- Born: August 25, 1902 Delaware, U.S.
- Died: August 30, 1951 (aged 49) Wilmington, Delaware, U.S.
- Weight: Bantamweight

Boxing career

Boxing record
- Total fights: 207
- Wins: 203
- Losses: 2
- Draws: 2

Albert Clifford Sund, also known by his ring names Kid Sunn and Marty Sullivan (August 25, 1902 – August 30, 1951) was an American professional boxer who competed from 1918 to 1928. He was inducted into the Delaware Sports Museum and Hall of Fame in 1994.

== Boxing career ==
A Delaware native, Sund started boxing around the age of 17 at shows staged in Wilmington. He "progressed rapidly and soon climbed to the top of local ranks in his class, by defeating all the glovemen who faced him," wrote The Evening Journal. Sund, who went by the ring names "Kid Sunn" and "Marty Sullivan," started his career by winning 53 straight fights and at one point had a career record of 87–1, including 19 consecutive knockouts. He was trained and often fought at the Keystone Field Club at East Fourth Street, and was managed by Olen Hackett early in his career. He later was managed by George Maull. In c. 1921, he was named unofficial bantamweight state champion, a title he never lost. He later fought in the Madison Square Garden and several east coast cities, including Harlem, Albany, Chester, Brooklyn, and multiple others. Sund retired in 1928 with a lifetime record of 203–2–2, winning 98.55% of his fights.

== Later life and death ==
Sund later worked for the Pennsylvania Railroad as an upholsterer. On August 30, 1951, Sund collapsed while visiting a friend and was pronounced dead upon arrival to the Delaware Hospital. He was 49 at the time of his death.

Sund was posthumously inducted into the Delaware Sports Museum and Hall of Fame in 1994. His brother Lenny Sund was inducted in 1998.
