= Harald Sunde =

Harald Sunde may refer to:

- Harald Sunde (footballer) (born 1944), Norwegian international footballer
- Harald Sunde (general) (born 1954), Norwegian military officer, Chief of Defence of Norway
