= Sundanese (Unicode block) =

- Range: U+1B80..U+1BBF (64 code points)
- Plane: BMP
- Scripts: Sundanese
- Major alphabets: Aksara Sunda
- Assigned: 64 code points
- Unused: 0 reserved code points

Unicode version history
- 5.1 (2008): 55 (+55)
- 6.1 (2012): 64 (+9)

Unicode documentation
- Code chart ∣ Web page

Sundanese is a Unicode block containing modern characters for writing the Sundanese script of the Sundanese language of the island of Java, Indonesia.

Sundanese^{[1]} Official Unicode Consortium code chart (PDF)
	0	1	2	3	4	5	6	7	8	9	A	B	C	D	E	F
U+1B8x	ᮀ	ᮁ	ᮂ	ᮃ	ᮄ	ᮅ	ᮆ	ᮇ	ᮈ	ᮉ	ᮊ	ᮋ	ᮌ	ᮍ	ᮎ	ᮏ
U+1B9x	ᮐ	ᮑ	ᮒ	ᮓ	ᮔ	ᮕ	ᮖ	ᮗ	ᮘ	ᮙ	ᮚ	ᮛ	ᮜ	ᮝ	ᮞ	ᮟ
U+1BAx	ᮠ	ᮡ	ᮢ	ᮣ	ᮤ	ᮥ	ᮦ	ᮧ	ᮨ	ᮩ	᮪	᮫	ᮬ	ᮭ	ᮮ	ᮯ
U+1BBx	᮰	᮱	᮲	᮳	᮴	᮵	᮶	᮷	᮸	᮹	ᮺ	ᮻ	ᮼ	ᮽ	ᮾ	ᮿ
Notes: 1. As of Unicode version 16.0

== History ==
The following Unicode-related documents record the purpose and process of defining specific characters in the Sundanese block:

Version	Final code points (Note: Proposed code points and characters names may differ from final code points and names)	Count	L2 ID	WG2 ID	Document
5.1	U+1B80..1BAA, 1BAE..1BB9	55	L2/06-002	N3022	Everson, Michael (2006-01-09), Proposal for encoding the Sundanese script in the BMP of the UCS
5.1	U+1B80..1BAA, 1BAE..1BB9	55	L2/06-008R2		Moore, Lisa (2006-02-13), "C.3", UTC #106 Minutes
5.1	U+1B80..1BAA, 1BAE..1BB9	55	L2/06-108		Moore, Lisa (2006-05-25), "C.5", UTC #107 Minutes
5.1	U+1B80..1BAA, 1BAE..1BB9	55		N3103 (pdf, doc)	Umamaheswaran, V. S. (2006-08-25), "M48.9", Unconfirmed minutes of WG 2 meeting 48, Mountain View, CA, USA; 2006-04-24/27
5.1	U+1B80..1BAA, 1BAE..1BB9	55	L2/16-123		"Glyph correction needed for Sundanese Letter JA (1B8F)", Comments on Public Review Issues (Jan 22, 2016 - May 03, 2016), 2016-05-05
6.1	U+1BAB..1BAD, 1BBA..1BBF	9	L2/09-190	N3648	Everson, Michael (2009-05-05), Preliminary proposal for encoding additional Sundanese characters for Old Sundanese
6.1	U+1BAB..1BAD, 1BBA..1BBF	9	L2/09-225R		Moore, Lisa (2009-08-17), "C.7", UTC #120 / L2 #217 Minutes
6.1	U+1BAB..1BAD, 1BBA..1BBF	9	L2/09-251R	N3666R	Everson, Michael (2009-09-05), Proposal for encoding additional Sundanese characters for Old Sundanese
6.1	U+1BAB..1BAD, 1BBA..1BBF	9		N3703 (pdf, doc)	Umamaheswaran, V. S. (2010-04-13), "M55.22", Unconfirmed minutes of WG 2 meeting no. 55, Tokyo 2009-10-26/30
6.1	U+1BAB..1BAD, 1BBA..1BBF	9	L2/14-034		Glass, Andrew (2014-01-27), Fixing the properties of two Sundanese characters
6.1	U+1BAB..1BAD, 1BBA..1BBF	9	L2/14-026		Moore, Lisa (2014-02-17), "Consensus 138-C4", UTC #138 Minutes, "Change the general category of U+1BAC and U+1BAD from Mc to Mn and the bidi property from L to NSM, for Unicode 7.0."
6.1	U+1BAB..1BAD, 1BBA..1BBF	9	L2/20-046		Anderson, Deborah; Whistler, Ken; Pournader, Roozbeh; Moore, Lisa; Liang, Hai (2020-01-10), "13. Other – Glyph Changes", Recommendations to UTC #162 January 2020 on Script Proposals
6.1	U+1BAB..1BAD, 1BBA..1BBF	9	L2/20-012		Schneider, Marcel (2020-01-13), Proposal to synchronize seven glyphs in the Code Charts
6.1	U+1BAB..1BAD, 1BBA..1BBF	9	L2/21-221		Nurwansah, Ilham (2021-09-28), Wrong Identities of Three Historical Sundanese Character [Affects U+1BBA, 1BBD, 1BBF]
6.1	U+1BAB..1BAD, 1BBA..1BBF	9	L2/21-174		Anderson, Deborah; Whistler, Ken; Pournader, Roozbeh; Liang, Hai (2021-10-01), "13. Sundanese", Recommendations to UTC #169 October 2021 on Script Proposals
6.1	U+1BAB..1BAD, 1BBA..1BBF	9	L2/21-167		Cummings, Craig (2022-01-27), "B.1 Section 13 Sundanese", Approved Minutes of UTC Meeting 169

== See also ==
- Javanese (Unicode block)
- Balinese (Unicode block)
