= Sundanese script =

Sundanese writing system

Sundanese Script Aksara Sunda Baku ᮃᮊ᮪ᮞᮛ ᮞᮥᮔ᮪ᮓ
- Script type: Abugida
- Period: c. 14th–18th centuries (as Old Sundanese script); 1996-present (as Sundanese script)
- Direction: Left-to-right
- Languages: Sundanese

Related scripts
- Parent systems: Egyptian: Proto-Sinaitic; Phoenician; Aramaic; Brahmi script; Tamil-Brahmi; Pallava; Old Kawi; Old Sundanese; Sundanese Script
- Sister systems: Balinese; Batak script; Baybayin scripts; Javanese script; Lontara script; Makassar script; Rencong script; Ulu scripts

ISO 15924
- ISO 15924: Sund (362), Sundanese

Unicode
- Unicode alias: Sundanese
- Unicode range: U+1B80–U+1BBF Sundanese; U+1CC0–U+1CCF Sundanese Supplement

Part of a series on

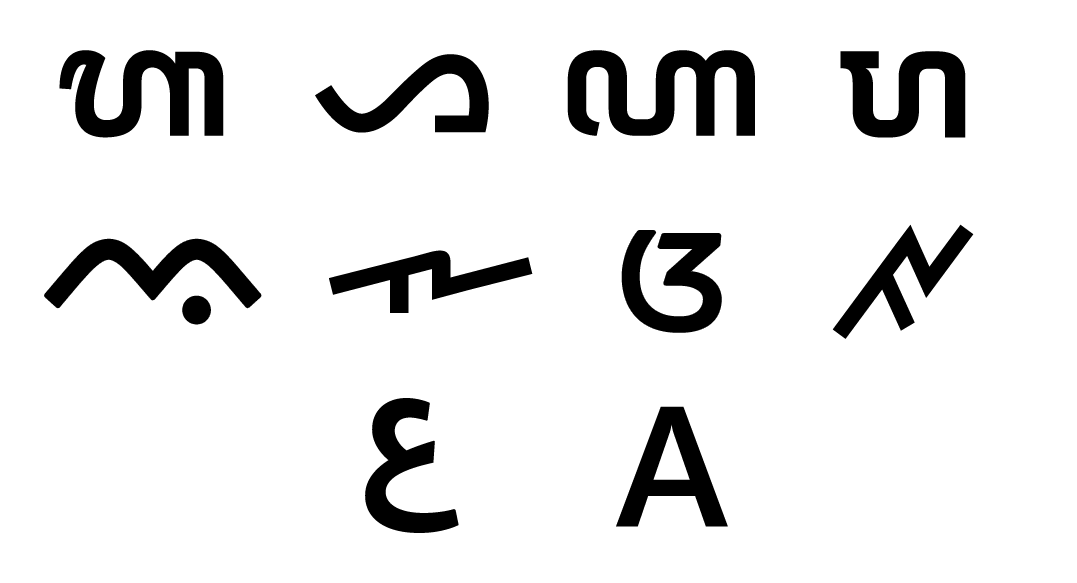

Writing systems used in Indonesia
Abugida (Brahmic)
- Balinese
- Batak
- Buda
- Javanese
- Kawi
- Lontara (Satera Jontal, Mbojo)
- Makasar
- Sasak
- Sundanese (Old Sundanese)
- Ulu (Incung, Komering, Lampung, Lembak,
- Ogan, Pasemah, Rejang, Serawai)
Abjad
- Buri Wolio
- Jawi
- Jawoe
- Pegon
Alphabet
- Latin (Van Ophuijsen, Suwandi, EYD)
Others
- Alifuru
- Bonda
- Cia-Cia
- Bilang-bilang
- Dunging
Related
- List of writing systems of Indonesia
- Languages of Indonesia

Standard Sundanese script (Aksara Sunda Baku, ᮃᮊ᮪ᮞᮛ ᮞᮥᮔ᮪ᮓ ᮘᮊᮥ) is a traditional writing system used by the Sundanese people to write the Sundanese language. It is based on the Old Sundanese script (Aksara Sunda Kuno) which was used from the 14th to the 18th centuries.

== History ==
Old Sundanese was developed based on the Pallava script of India, and was used from the 14th until the 18th centuries. The last manuscript written in Old Sundanese script was the Carita Waruga Guru. From the 17th to the 19th centuries, Sundanese was mostly spoken and not written. Javanese and Pegon scripts were used to write Sundanese during this period. In 1996, the government of West Java announced a plan to introduce an official Sundanese script, and in October 1997, the Old Sundanese script was chosen and renamed to Aksara Sunda.

== Typology ==
The standardized script has 32 basic characters: seven vowels, 23 consonants, and thirteen phonetic diacritics (Sundanese: rarangkén). There are also numerals from zero to nine.

=== Consonants ===
Each consonant (Sundanese: aksara ngalagéna) carries an inherent vowel 'a', so that each consonant letter is pronounced as a syllable. The original eighteen consonants are ka-ga-nga, ca-ja-nya, ta-da-na, pa-ba-ma, ya-ra-la, wa-sa-ha.

An additional five consonants, fa-va-qa-xa-za have been added in order to improve the script as a tool for recording the development of the Sundanese language, especially regarding the adoption of foreign words and sounds. The new glyphs have been developed through re-use of letters found in the old Sundanese script. For example, the letters fa and va are variants of Old Sundanese pa; qa and xa are variants of Old Sundanese ka; and za is a variant of Old Sundanese ja.

There are two non-standard consonants, kha and sha, used for transcribing the Arabic consonants خ and ش.

Consonants
| ᮊ ka IPA: /ka/ | ᮌ ga IPA: /ga/ | ᮍ nga IPA: /ŋa/ | ᮎ ca IPA: /t͜ɕa/ | ᮏ ja IPA: /d͜ʑa/ | ᮑ nya IPA: /ɲa/ |
| ᮒ ta IPA: /ta/ | ᮓ da IPA: /da/ | ᮔ na IPA: /na/ | ᮕ pa IPA: /pa/ | ᮘ ba IPA: /ba/ | ᮙ ma IPA: /ma/ |
| ᮚ ya IPA: /ja/ | ᮛ ra IPA: /ra/ | ᮜ la IPA: /la/ | ᮝ wa IPA: /wa/ | ᮞ sa IPA: /sa/ | ᮠ ha IPA: /ha/ |

Additional consonants for writing foreign words
| ᮖ fa IPA: /fa/ | ᮋ qa IPA: /ka~qa/ | ᮗ va IPA: /fa~va/ | ᮟ xa IPA: /sa/, /ksa/ | ᮐ za IPA: /za/ | ᮮ kha IPA: /ħa/, /xa/ | ᮯ sya IPA: /ɕa/, /ʃa/ |

=== Vowels ===
There are seven independent vowels, a, é, i, o, u, e, and eu, each of which has an independent form and a rarangkén or diacritic. A basic consonant-vowel syllable is formed by adding a vowel diacritic to a consonant. The vowel diacritic replaces the consonant's inherent 'a' or, in the case of the "killer stroke" (pamaéh) removes the vowel entirely, creating an isolated consonant.

vowels with their diacritic forms and examples with ᮊ
| ᮃ a IPA: /a/ | ᮆ é IPA: /ɛ/ | ᮄ i IPA: /i/ | ᮇ o IPA: /ɔ/ | ᮅ u IPA: /u/ | ᮈ e IPA: /ə/ | ᮉ eu IPA: /ɤ/ | |
| | ◌ᮦ | ◌ᮤ | ◌ᮧ | ◌ ᮥ | ◌ ᮨ | ◌ ᮩ | -◌᮪ |
| ᮊ ka IPA: /ka/ | ᮊᮦ ké IPA: /kɛ/ | ᮊᮤ ki IPA: /ki/ | ᮊᮧ ko IPA: /kɔ/ | ᮊᮥ ku IPA: /ku/ | ᮊᮨ ke IPA: /kə/ | ᮊᮩ keu IPA: /kɤ/ | -ᮊ᮪ k IPA: /k/ |

=== Consonant diacritics ===
Additional diacritics are used to alter the consonants of a syllable.

| ◌ ᮁ adds a final /r/ | ◌ ᮀ adds a final /ŋ/ | ◌ᮢ inserts an /r/ | ◌ ᮣ inserts an /l/ | ◌ ᮡ inserts a /j/ | ◌ᮂ adds a final /h/ |
| ᮊᮁ kar | ᮊᮀ kang | ᮊᮢ kra | ᮊᮣ kla | ᮊᮡ kya | ᮊᮂ kah |

=== Numerals ===
In texts, numbers are written surrounded by dual pipes | ... |, for example, the year 2026 is written |᮲᮰᮲᮶|.

Sundanese numerals
| 0 ᮰ | 1 ᮱ | 2 ᮲ | 3 ᮳ | 4 ᮴ | 5 ᮵ | 6 ᮶ | 7 ᮷ | 8 ᮸ | 9 ᮹ |

=== Punctuation ===
In modern usage, Latin punctuation is used. Old Sundanese, though, was written using its own set of punctuation symbols. Sequences such as ᳇᳇, ᳆᳀᳆, which contains a ᳀, bindu surya, 'sun sign', and ᳆᳁, which contains a ᳁, bindu panglong, 'half-moon sign', are used to mark liturgical texts. ᳅᳂᳅, which contains a ᳂, bindu purnama, 'full moon sign', denoted a historical text. ᳀ is also sometimes used as a full stop, with ᳂ acting as a comma. ᳃, bindu chakra, 'wheel sign' was also used as a comma.

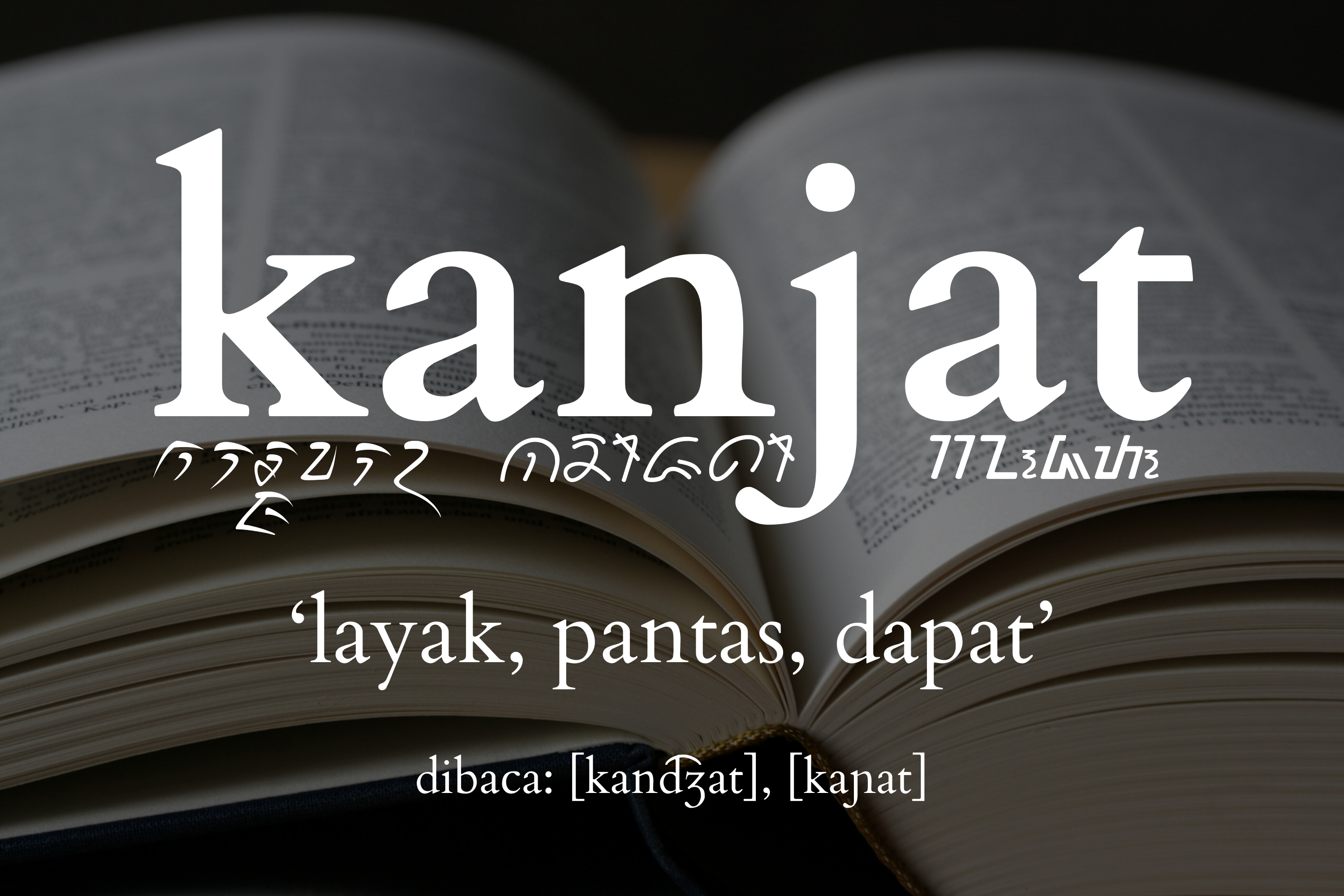

The punctuation symbols resembling letters with stripes (᳆, da satanga, 'decorated da', ᳇, ba satanga, 'decorated ba', and ᳅, ka satanga, 'decorated ka') originated as versions of the letters ᮓ, da, ᮘ, ba, and one half of the letter ᮊ, ka. Another symbol of unclear meaning is the ᳄, leu satanga, 'decorated leu', based on the archaic syllable ᮼ, seu.

== Sample text ==
Article 1 of the Universal Declaration of Human Rights

Sundanese

ᮞᮊᮥᮙ᮪ᮔ ᮏᮜ᮪ᮙ ᮌᮥᮘᮢᮌ᮪ ᮊ ᮃᮜᮙ᮪ ᮓᮥᮑ ᮒᮦᮂ ᮞᮤᮕᮒ᮪ᮔ ᮙᮨᮁᮓᮤᮊ ᮏᮩᮀ ᮘᮧᮌ ᮙᮁᮒᮘᮒ᮪ ᮊᮒᮥᮒ᮪ ᮠᮊ᮪-ᮠᮊ᮪ ᮃᮔᮥ ᮞᮛᮥᮃ. ᮙᮛᮔᮦᮂᮔ ᮓᮤᮘᮦᮛᮦ ᮃᮊᮜ᮪ ᮏᮩᮀ ᮠᮒᮦ ᮔᮥᮛᮔᮤ, ᮎᮙ᮪ᮕᮥᮁ-ᮌᮅᮜ᮪ ᮏᮩᮀ ᮞᮞᮙᮔ ᮃᮚ ᮓᮤᮔ ᮞᮥᮙᮍᮨᮒ᮪ ᮓᮥᮓᮥᮜᮥᮛᮔ᮪.

Romanized

Sakumna jalma gubrag ka alam dunya téh sipatna merdika jeung boga martabat katut hak-hak anu sarua. Maranéhna dibéré akal jeung haté nurani, campur-gaul jeung sasamana aya dina sumanget duduluran.

English

"All human beings are born free and equal in dignity and rights. They are endowed with reason and conscience and should act towards one another in a spirit of brotherhood."

== Unicode ==
Sundanese script was added to the Unicode Standard in April 2008 with the release of version 5.1. In version 6.3, the support of pasangan and some characters from Old Sundanese script were added.

=== Blocks ===
The Unicode block for Sundanese is U+1B80–U+1BBF. The Unicode block for Sundanese Supplement is U+1CC0–U+1CCF.

Sundanese^{[1]} Official Unicode Consortium code chart (PDF)
| | 0 | 1 | 2 | 3 | 4 | 5 | 6 | 7 | 8 | 9 | A | B | C | D | E | F |
| U+1B8x | ᮀ | ᮁ | ᮂ | ᮃ | ᮄ | ᮅ | ᮆ | ᮇ | ᮈ | ᮉ | ᮊ | ᮋ | ᮌ | ᮍ | ᮎ | ᮏ |
| U+1B9x | ᮐ | ᮑ | ᮒ | ᮓ | ᮔ | ᮕ | ᮖ | ᮗ | ᮘ | ᮙ | ᮚ | ᮛ | ᮜ | ᮝ | ᮞ | ᮟ |
| U+1BAx | ᮠ | ᮡ | ᮢ | ᮣ | ᮤ | ᮥ | ᮦ | ᮧ | ᮨ | ᮩ | ᮪ | ᮫ | ᮬ | ᮭ | ᮮ | ᮯ |
| U+1BBx | ᮰ | ᮱ | ᮲ | ᮳ | ᮴ | ᮵ | ᮶ | ᮷ | ᮸ | ᮹ | ᮺ | ᮻ | ᮼ | ᮽ | ᮾ | ᮿ |
Notes 1.As of Unicode version 18.0

Sundanese Supplement^{[1]}^{[2]} Official Unicode Consortium code chart (PDF)
| | 0 | 1 | 2 | 3 | 4 | 5 | 6 | 7 | 8 | 9 | A | B | C | D | E | F |
| U+1CCx | ᳀ | ᳁ | ᳂ | ᳃ | ᳄ | ᳅ | ᳆ | ᳇ | | | | | | | | |
Notes 1.As of Unicode version 18.0 2.Grey areas indicate non-assigned code points

== Gallery ==
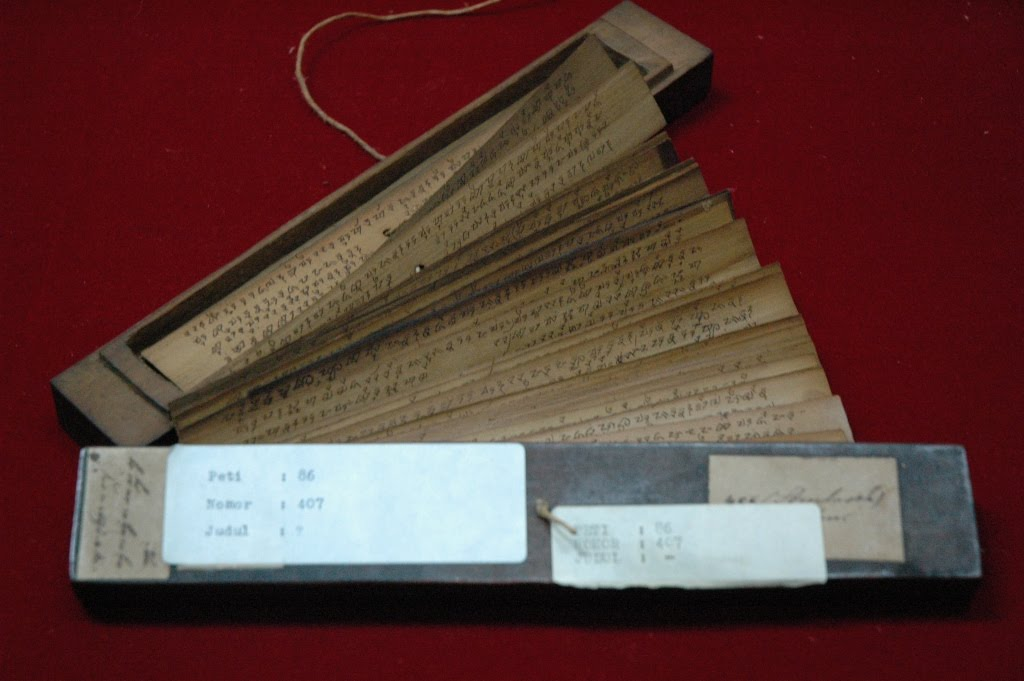
A Sundanese lontar manuscript written in Sundanese script.

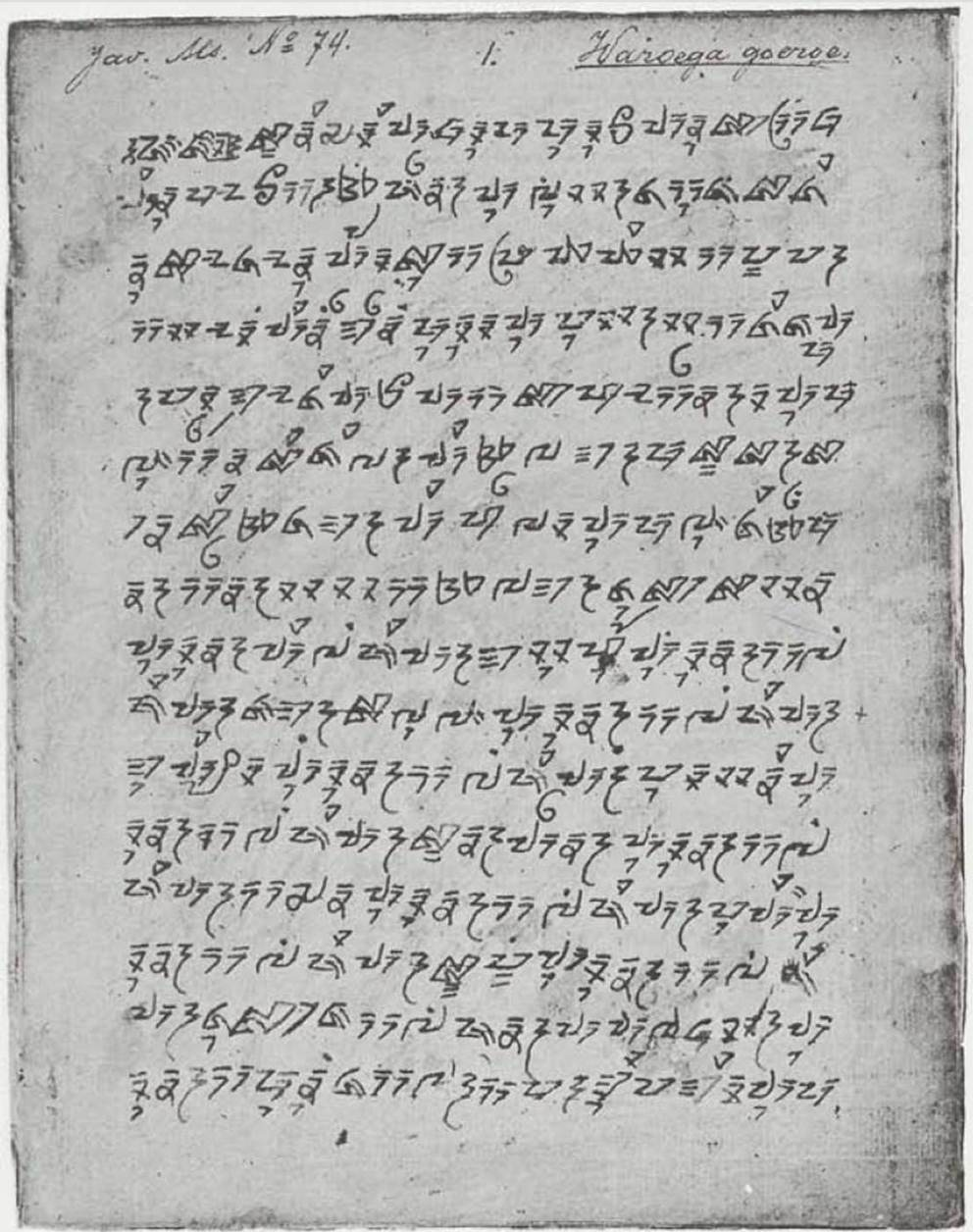
The first page of a manuscript containing the Old Sundanese Carita Waruga Guru, written in Old Sundanese script.

== See also ==
- Sundanese language
- Old Sundanese language
- Buda script
- Sundanese numerals
