= List of awards and nominations received by Masterpiece =

Masterpiece awards and nominations
Awards and nominations
Award	Wins	Nominations
Dayak Music Awards	9	15
Anugerah Juara Rentak Ruai (AJARR) Awards	1	1
Voice Independent Music Awards	0	2
Anugerah Carta Sapa Juara (ACSJ) Awards	4	5

Totals (Note: Certain award groups do not simply award one winner. They acknowledge several different recipients, have runners-up, and have third place. Since this is a specific recognition and is different from losing an award, runner-up mentions are considered wins in this award tally. For simplification and to avoid errors, each award in this list has been presumed to have had a prior nomination.)
- Wins: 14
- Nominations: 23

Masterpiece is an Iban rock band formed in Sibu, Sarawak by Willy Edwin and his brother Kennedy Edwin in 2003. The band's current line-up consists of lead vocalist Depha Masterpiece, lead guitarist Willy Edwin, rhythm guitarist and vocalist Kennedy Edwin, bassist Watt Marcus, drummer Harold Vincent and keyboardists Valentine Jimmy and Roslee Qadir. The band have released four studio albums: Merindang Ke Bintang (2009), Rock & Roll (2013), Ngap Sayot (2014) and Ngarap Ka Nuan Nikal Pulai (2016). All of the albums were released by Panggau Buluh Pengerindu Records, except for Ngap Sayot, released by DO Records Entertainment.

Masterpiece has received fourteen awards from several nominations in Sarawak Music Awards ceremonies. The band has received nine awards from the Dayak Music Awards—Winning the Album of the Year two times for Merindang Ke Bintang in 2010 and Ngarap Ka Nuan Nikal Pulai in 2016. The group also won the 'Best Rock Artist' awards in 2014. "Sinu", from Merindang Ke Bintang has won the 'Song of the Year' awards at the 2011 AJARR Music Awards while "Ngarap Ka Nuan Nikal Pulai" from the fourth album, winning the same category at the 2016 ACSJ Music Awards. Masterpiece also won the 'Best Stage Performance' award three times—"Kumang Seari" in 2014 "Ngap Sayot" in 2016 and "Siku Dalam Seribu" in 2017. The song "Kumang Seari", received the 'Best Rock Song' award nomination at the 2014 VIMA Music Awards.

== Dayak Music Awards ==
The Dayak Music Awards is the music awards ceremony presented by Dayak Artists and Musicians Association (DAMA) since 2008 and continuously presented on every two consecutive years. Masterpiece has received nine awards from fourteen nominations.

Year	Nominee / work	Award	Result
2010	Masterpiece	Most Popular Group	Won
2010	Masterpiece	Best New Artist	Won
2010	Masterpiece	Best Vocal for Duo/Group	Nominated
2010	Merindang Ke Bintang	Album of the Year	Won
2010	Merindang Ke Bintang	Best Album Cover	Won
2010	"Bulat Ati Ku"	Best Music Video	Won
2012	Masterpiece	Best Rock Artist	Nominated
2012	"Badu"	Best Music Arrangement	Nominated
2014	Masterpiece	Best Rock Artist	Won
2016	Ngap Sayot	Best Vocals	Won
2016	Ngap Sayot	Best Performance	Won
2016	Ngarap Ka Nuan Nikal Pulai	Album of the Year	Won
2016	"Berani Mati"	Best Rock Song	Nominated
2016	"Nuan Enggau Aku"	Best Music Video	Nominated
2016	Ngarap Ka Nuan Nikal Pulai	Best Album Cover	Nominated

== Anugerah Juara Rentak Ruai (AJARR) Awards ==
The Anugerah Juara Rentak Ruai (AJARR) Awards is an annual awards ceremony held by Cats FM radio station since 2003 until 2012. The winners are selected by a group of professional jury. Masterpiece has won one award.

Year	Nominee / work	Award	Result
2011	"Sinu"	Song of the Year	Won

== Voice Independent Music Awards VIMA Malaysia ==
The Voice Independent Music Awards was Asia's first independent music awards launched in 2008. Masterpiece has received one nomination.

Year	Nominee / work	Award	Result
2014	"Kumang Seari"	Best Rock Song	Wild Card

== Voice Independent Music Awards VIMA Asia ==
Year	Nominee / work	Award	Result
2014	"Kumang Seari"	Best Rock Song	Nominated

== Anugerah Carta Sapa Juara (ACSJ) Awards ==
The Anugerah Carta Sapa Juara (ACSJ) Awards are presented for Dayak musicians and entertainer in Sarawak organized by Sarawak Radio Televisyen Malaysia since 2014. Masterpiece has won four awards.

Year	Nominee / work	Award	Result
2014	"Kumang Seari"	Song of the Year	Nominated
2014	Masterpiece	Best Performance	Won
2016	"Ngarap Ka Nuan Nikal Pulai"	Song of the Year	Won
2017	"Siku Dalam Seribu"	Song of the Year	Runner up
2017	Masterpiece & Lyssa Jean	Best Performance	Won
