= List of songs recorded by Masterpiece =

Masterpiece is an Iban hard rock band from Sibu, Sarawak, Malaysia. Originally formed in 2003, the band features Depha Masterpiece (vocals), Kennedy Edwin (guitar-vocals), Willy Edwin (lead guitar), Watt Marcus (bass), Harold Vincent (drums), Valentine Jimmy (keyboards) and Roslee Qadir (keyboards). The band has recorded songs for four studio albums and a number of songs for various collaborative albums. Masterpiece released their debut studio album Merindang Ke Bintang in 2009 and was re-issued through Panggau Buluh Pengerindu Records the following year. Five of the songs from Merindang Ke Bintang were written by Depha, while "Kumang Mimpi" is co-written by Roslee Qadir, Kennedy Edwin and Willy Edwin.

In 2013, the band released its second full-length studio album Rock & Roll, which once again credited Depha for songwriting. The album was accompanied by music videos directed by Cosmas Moses Alexander. The following year, Masterpiece released Ngap Sayot through an independent music label, Do Records Entertainment, which credited Roslee Qadir for his lyrics on the Sarawak Malay version of "Ngap Sayot". Masterpiece returned in 2016 with their fourth album Ngarap Ka Nuan Nikal Pulai, songwriting for which was credited entirely to Depha. On 5 August 2017, the band released “Perecha” as the second single from their upcoming album. The band released its fifth studio album, Ensera Paragon in August 2018 through its first major label, Warner Music Malaysia.

The following is a list of released songs recorded by Masterpiece:

== Songs ==
Key
†	Indicates song released as a single

Song	Release	Year	Video	Writer(s)	Length	Ref.
"Aku Benci"	Rock & Roll	2013		Depha	03:54	
"Anak"	Ngarap Ka Nuan Nikal Pulai	2016		Depha	05:32	
"Anang Irau"	Ensera Paragon	2018		Depha	04:45	
"Apokalips"	Ensera Paragon	2018		Depha	03:44	
"Badasman"	Ngarap Ka Nuan Nikal Pulai	2016		Depha	05:06	
"Badu"†	Rock & Roll	2013		Depha	04:51	
"Berami Ba Ati Nuan"†	Gawai compilations	2014		Depha	04:05	
"Berani Mati"	Ngarap Ka Nuan Nikal Pulai	2016		Depha	04:37	
"Bintang Jalai"	Ensera Paragon	2018		Depha	05:01	
"Bulat Ati Ku"	Merindang Ke Bintang	2009	Watch Video	Depha	04:18	
"Daliyah"	Ensera Paragon	2018		Depha	05:06	
"De Ja Vu"	Rock & Roll	2013		Depha	04:14	
"Diva Enigma" (feat. Josephine Jurie)	Ensera Paragon	2018		Depha	04:33	
"Drama Ku Ingat"	Ngarap Ka Nuan Nikal Pulai	2016		Depha	04:37	
"Enda Aci Lah"	Ngarap Ka Nuan Nikal Pulai	2016		Depha	04:03	
"Gaun Putih"	Rock & Roll	2013		Depha	06:21	
"Intan Enggau Batu"	Rock & Roll	2013		Depha	05:56	
"Kaban"†	Single	2016	Watch Video	Depha	06:01	
"Kumang Mimpi"	Merindang Ke Bintang	2009		Roslee Qadir; Masterpiece	04:21	
"Kunci Meligai Ati" - Instrumental	Ensera Paragon	2018		Depha	04:09	
"Kumang Seari"†	Rock & Roll	2013		Depha	05:46	
"Malam-Malam"	Merindang Ke Bintang	2009		Depha	06:36	
"Mansau Leka Padi"†	Gawai compilations	2011		Depha	04:03	
"Misteri"	Merindang Ke Bintang	2009		Depha	04:56	
"Nadai Ati Berami" †	Gawai compilations	2015		Depha	04:54	
"Nadai Ati Berami" (Re-issue)	Ngarap Ka Nuan Nikal Pulai	2016		Depha	04:54	
"Nadai Benci"	Merindang Ke Bintang	2009		Depha	06:07	
"Ngap Sayot"†	Ngap Sayot	2014	Watch Video (unofficial clip, but original demo sound)	Depha	04:33	
"Ngap Sayot" Instrumental version	Ngap Sayot	2014		Depha	04:33	
"Ngap Sayot" Sarawak Malay version	Ngap Sayot	2014		Roslee Qadir; Depha	04:34	
"Ngap Sayot" Chant version	Ngap Sayot	2014		Depha	0:55	
"Ngarap Ka Nuan Nikal Pulai"†	Ngarap Ka Nuan Nikal Pulai	2015	Watch Video	Depha	04:44	
"Ngarap Ka Nuan Nikal Pulai" (Re-issue)	Ngarap Ka Nuan Nikal Pulai	2016		Depha	04:44	
"Nuan Enggau Aku"	Ngarap Ka Nuan Nikal Pulai	2016		Depha	05:50	
"Nyaga Negeri"	Rock & Roll	2013		Depha	05:38	
"Nyawa Aja Tanya"	Rock & Roll	2013		Depha	03:50	
"Perecha"†	Single	2017	Watch Video	Depha	04:57	
"Redak Seribu"†	Single	2020	Watch Video	Depha	05:26	
"Sakam"	Ngarap Ka Nuan Nikal Pulai	2016		Depha	04:43	
"Sembilan Bulan"	Rock & Roll	2013		Depha	06:57	
"Siku Dalam Seribu"	Ngarap Ka Nuan Nikal Pulai	2016		Depha	05:50	
"Sinu" †	Merindang Ke Bintang	2009		Depha	04:24	
"Terebai"	Rock & Roll	2013		Depha	06:38	
