= Kaban (Masterpiece song) =

Single by Masterpiece
- Released: 2016
- Recorded: 2016
- Genre: Country Rock
- Length: 5:53 (radio version)
- Label: Masterjam Studio
- Songwriter: Depha Masterpiece
- Producer: Masterpiece

Masterpiece singles chronology
"Ngarap Ka Nuan Nikal Pulai" (2016)	"Kaban" (2016)

Music video
- "Kaban" on YouTube

"Kaban" is a single recorded by the iban rock band Masterpiece. The song was officially released on October 19, 2016 through YouTube via their independent label, Masterjam Studio. The song was released as a digital download single on the same day. In an interview with The Borneo Post on December 8, the band had announced that "Kaban" is the promotional single for their upcoming fifth studio album which planned to be released in 2017.

== Track listing ==
- "Kaban" (Radio Version) - 5:53

== Music video ==
The music video was directed by Kennedy Edwin and filmed on various location and venue around Sarawak features the band candid footage while on tour and live on a stage between July and September 2016.

== Personnel ==
Masterpiece

- Willy Edwin – guitars, recording technician
- Kennedy Edwin (Kent) – guitars, backing & 2nd vocals
- Watt Marcus – bass
- Depha – lead vocals, composer & songwriter
- Harold Vincent – drums
- Roslee Kadir – keyboards
- Valentine Jimmy (Emek) – keyboards

Production

- Masterpiece - producer
- Iskandar iMusik Studio - mixing
- Iskandar iMusik Studio - mastering
