= Siku Dalam Seribu =

Song by Depha Masterpiece

Song by Masterpiece and Lyssa Jean

from the album Ngarap Ka Nuan Nikal Pulai
- Language: Iban
- English title: Among A Thousand
- Released: 2016
- Recorded: 2015
- Studio: Masterjam Studio, Majestic Media Production
- Genre: Sentimental ballad
- Length: 5:03 (album version); 4:51 (radio edit)
- Label: Panggau Buluh Pengerindu
- Songwriter(s): Depha Masterpiece
- Producer(s): Embat Lala

Siku Dalam Seribu is a song written by Depha Masterpiece and recorded as a duet between him and singer, Allyssa Joanne or better known as Lyssa Jean. The lyrics essentially describes about a woman who learned to accept and open up to a new relationship after being hurt. She was told by the man, that she may not be his first love, but he promised her solemnly that he will love her unconditionally.

The song was recorded at Masterjam Studio and Majestic Media Production in 2015, also included in Masterpiece album, Ngarap Ka Nuan Nikal Pulai in 2016. The song became Masterpiece second biggest hit from the album after its first single, "Ngarap Ka Nuan Nikal Pulai". "Siku Dalam Seribu" earned the band & Lyssa Jean two awards for 'Best Stage Performance' and first runner-up for 'Best Song' at the 2017 ACSJ Music Awards, in Betong, Sarawak, on 23 September 2017.

== Track listing ==
- "Siku Dalam Seribu" (Album Version) - 5:03
- "Siku Dalam Seribu" (Radio Edit) - 4:51

== Music video ==
The music video was filmed in Kuching and Sibu, Sarawak, by Brodie William, director of Do Records Entertainment. It was shot at two locations in Kuching; One scene shows Depha and Lyssa performing the song at Betarak Mayau cafe in Kuching. It then blend with another scene where the band performing separately at one bar in Sibu.

== Credits ==
Masterpiece

- Depha Masterpiece – vocals, songwriter
- Kennedy Edwin – guitars
- Willy Edwin – guitars, recording technician
- Roslee Qadir – keyboards
- Valentine Jimmy – keyboards
- Watt Marcus – bass guitar
- Harold Vincent – drums

Guest singer

- Lyssa Jean

Production

- Recorded at Masterjam Studio, Sibu and Majestic Media Production, Bintulu, Malaysia
- Mixed and mastered at iMusik Studio, Sibu
- Engineered by Iskandar Bujang
- Videography: Brodie William @ DO Records Entertainment
- Producer: Embat Lala, Panggau Buluh Pengerindu Records, Sibu
