= Bulat Ati Ku =

Single by Masterpiece

from the album Merindang Ke Bintang
- Released: 2009
- Recorded: 2008
- Genre: Hard rock
- Length: 4:18 (album version)
- Label: Panggau Buluh Pengerindu
- Songwriter: Depha Masterpiece
- Producer: Embat Lala

Masterpiece singles chronology
"Malam-Malam" (2009)	"Bulat Ati Ku" (2009)	"Sinu" (2009)

Music video
- "Bulat Ati Ku" on YouTube

"Bulat Ati Ku" is a song by the Iban rock band Masterpiece. It was included on their debut album, Merindang Ke Bintang and released through Panggau Buluh Pengerindu Records in 2009. "Bulat Ati Ku" has earned the band the 'Best Music Video' award at the 2010 AMD 2010 music awards.

== Track listing ==
- "Bulat Ati Ku" (Album Version) - 4:18

== Music video ==
The music video (directed by Harry Frederick) was filmed with two scenes in Sibu, featuring the band performing on a rooftop and Depha on a bike, while all four members—as a group—were driving cars on the Durin highway. The video was shot in two days.
