= Remun language =

Ibanic language spoken in Borneo

Remun
- Milikin
- Native to: Malaysia
- Region: Sarawak
- Native speakers: (3,500 cited 2000)
- Language family: Austronesian: Malayo-Polynesian; Malayo-Sumbawan; Malayic; Ibanic; Remun

Language codes
- ISO 639-3: lkj
- Glottolog: remu1237
- ELP: Remun

Remun, or Milikin, is an Ibanic Dayak language of Borneo.

== Geographic distribution ==
The language is spoken by roughly 3600 inhabitants of the Sarawak region.

Remun is the primary Iban-Remun language dialect in the Borneo area, and particularly the Sarawak region. Despite being 88% similar to the Iban language, individuals in locales that speak Remun state the language is easily hidden from outsiders' understanding, even speakers of Iban. Remun is endangered, as its speakers are slowly shifting towards speaking Iban.

== Vocabulary ==
Comparison between Standard Malay, Standard Iban, and the Remun dialect
| English | Standard Malay | Standard Iban | Remun |
|---|---|---|---|
| No | Tidak | Enda | Entau |
| See | Lihat | Meda | Ngilau |
| Know | Tahu | Nemu | Badak |
| Shirt | Baju | Baju | Kelatang |
| Run | Berlari | Belanda | Belawak |
| Silence! | Senyap | Anang inggar | Sengian |
| Stupid | Bodoh | Beli'/Palui | Labulan |
| No/Did not | Tiada | Nadai | Entai |
| Tomorrow | Besok | Pagila | Pagi |
| Later | Nanti | Lagi/legi | Ila |
| Mat | Tikar | Tikai | Kelaya |
| Good | Bagus | Manah | Nyelaie |

- Sample phases in Standard Iban and Remun:
  - Entai ku ngilau – Nadai aku meda. "I do not see."
  - Entauk ku badak – Enda ku nemu. "I could not find."

== Language comparisons ==
| Older Generation | Younger Generation | Languages the Words Borrowed From |
|---|---|---|
| Kelatang (Dress) | Baju | Bahasa Malaysia |
| Ngatong (Later) | Nanti | Bahasa Malaysia |
| Ngilau (See) | Meda | Iban main |
| Kayu (Food) | Lauk | Bahasa Malaysia/Iban Main |
| Tegeran Iengan (Eat) | Makai | Iban main |
| Ngitung atap/rasau (Sleep) | Tidur | Bahasa Malaysia |
| Besulu (Lover/friend) | Bepangan | Bahasa Malaysia |
| Reti (Meaning) | Maksud | Bahasa Malaysia |
| Pangin (Room) | Bilik | Bahasa Malaysia |
| Lebulan (Stupid) | Bodoh | Bahasa Malaysia |
| Entau medak (I don't know) | Enda nemu | Iban Main |
| Anteh (Quick) | Cepat | Bahasa Malaysia |
| Tanchut (Trousers) | Tanchut | Bahasa Malaysia |
