= Depha Masterpiece =

Malaysian Singer-songwriter, composer

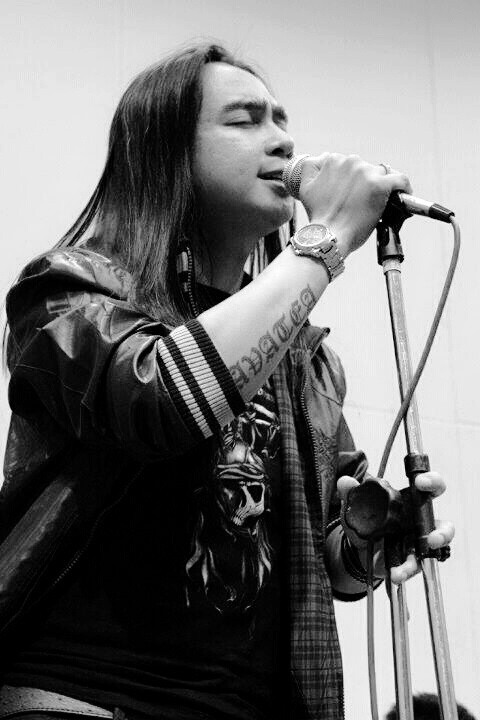
- Depha in 2012

Background information
- Born: Aldrine Phillie Anak Martin Nyambar; 18 August 1980 (age 45); Kapit, Sarawak, Malaysia
- Origin: Sibu, Sarawak, Malaysia
- Genres: Hard rock, heavy metal
- Occupations: Singer, songwriter, composer music arranger, music programmer and music producer
- Instruments: Vocals, guitar, Keyboard
- Years active: 2003–present
- Labels: Warner Music, Masterjam, (PBP) Panggau Buluh Pengerindu

Aldrine Phillie Anak Martin Nyambar or known as Depha Masterpiece is a Malaysian rock musician, songwriter, arranger, and producer from Sarawak. He is best known as the lead vocalist and primary songwriter of the Bornean hard rock band, Masterpiece.

Raised in Sabah, Depha moved to Sarawak in the early 1990s, where he became active in the local hard rock scene and joined several bands, including Silent Killer and Black Monkey. In 2005, he joined Masterpiece, with whom he enjoyed great success and recognition in the late 2000s. Their first album, Merindang Ke Bintang has won numerous awards including the best produced debut album of 2009–2010 during the Dayak Music Awards 2010, in Sarawak. Its full-length follow-ups, the second albums Rock & Roll (2013), were also widely successful; which respectively debuted at No. 1 on the Local Radio Station for months. He has since recorded another three studio albums with the band; Ngap Sayot (2014), Ngarap Ka Nuan Nikal Pulai (2016) and followed by Ensera Paragon (2018).

Depha has worked as a composer and songwriter for other artists, including Hailey Robson, Melissa Francis and Watt Rock. He is one of the most influential rock vocalist & musicians in Sarawak.

== Personal life ==
Depha was born in Kapit, Sarawak. He learned to play the guitar at age 13, and in the late 1990s was part of a rock cover band, Black Monkey which also included future Masterpiece's member Marcus.

In 2005, Depha was recruited by Masterpiece-founder Willy Edwin and his brother Kennedy Edwin in Sibu and has since appeared on all released albums by the band, up through their latest album Ensera Paragon. He has composed and produced almost all songs for Masterpiece except "Kumang Mimpi" from Merindang Ke Bintang which is co-written by the band's present keyboardist, Roslee Qadir. He was also responsible for the acoustic intro of "Ngap Sayot".

Depha identifies Metallica as having been his main musical influence as a child, and has said they were the reason he wanted to play guitar. He was also a fan of 70s & 80s hard rock and heavy metal bands, including White Lion, AC/DC, Iron Maiden, Queen, Black Sabbath, Deep Purple and Bon Jovi. Masterpiece occasionally played cover songs by these bands, including Queen's "I want to break free", Bon Jovi's "It's my life," and Metallica' "Enter Sandman". He has also cited Led Zeppelin, Nightwish, Kamelot, The Calling, Dewa 19, Nickelback and Avenged Sevenfold as important influences in his own songwriting style.

== Masterpiece ==
Current members

- Willy Edwin – lead guitars (2003–present)
- Kennedy Edwin (Kent) – guitars, vocals, backing vocals (2003–present)
- Watt Marcus – bass (2003–present)
- Depha – lead vocals, songwriter (2005–present)
- Harold Vincent – drums (2005–present)
- Valentine Jimmy (Emek) – keyboards (Touring 2011–2012; official 2013–present)
- Roslee Kadir – keyboards, piano, backing vocals (2011–present)

Former members

- Roni – drums (2003–2005)
- Dellender Wilson – keyboards (2005–2008)
- Timothy Umpok – keyboards (2008–2011)

== Awards and achievements ==
Masterpiece has been recognised by several Sarawak Music Awards ceremonies; the band has received twelve awards from several nominations. Notable awards they have won include the Most Popular Group, voted by fans via SMS in 2010 Dayak Music Awards and best rock artiste in Dayak Music Awards on 2014. For their contribution and support to Sarawak music industry, they were invited to be the opening act for the Malaysian legendary rock band, Search (band) during their 30th anniversary Fenomena concert in Stadium Negeri Kuching Sarawak in December 2011.

Year	Category	Nominated work	Album / Material	Awards	Result
2010	Most Popular Group	Masterpiece	Merindang Ke Bintang	Dayak Music Awards DAMA	Won
2010	Best Video Clips	"Bulat Ati Ku"	Merindang Ke Bintang	Dayak Music Awards DAMA	Won
2010	Best Album of the Year	Masterpiece	Merindang Ke Bintang	Dayak Music Awards DAMA	Won
2010	Best Album Cover	Masterpiece	Merindang Ke Bintang	Dayak Music Awards DAMA	Won
2010	Best New Artiste	Masterpiece	Merindang Ke Bintang	Dayak Music Awards DAMA	Won
2011	Best Song	Sinu	Merindang Ke Bintang	Anugerah Juara Rentak Ruai	Won
2012	Best Rock Artiste	"Badu"	Single	Dayak Music Awards DAMA	Nominated
2012	Best Music Arrangement	"Badu"	Single	Dayak Music Awards DAMA	Nominated
2014	Best Rock Song	"Kumang Seari"	Rock & Roll	Voice Independent Music Awards Malaysia	Wild Card
2014	Best Rock Song	"Kumang Seari"	Rock & Roll	Voice Independent Music Awards Asia	Nominated
2014	Best Performance Awards	"Kumang Seari"	Rock & Roll	Anugerah Carta Sapa Juara Wai FM	Won
2014	Best Rock Artiste	"Nyaga Negeri"	Rock & Roll	Dayak Music Awards DAMA	Won
2016	Best Song	"Ngarap Ka Nuan Nikal Pulai"	Ngarap Ka Nuan Nikal Pulai	Anugerah Carta Sapa Juara Wai FM	Won
2016	Best Album of the Year	"Ngarap Ka Nuan Nikal Pulai"	Ngarap Ka Nuan Nikal Pulai	Dayak Music Awards DAMA	Won
2016	Best Vocals	"Ngap Sayot"	Ngap Sayot	Dayak Music Awards DAMA	Won
2016	Best Performance	"Ngap Sayot"	Ngap Sayot	Dayak Music Awards DAMA	Won
2016	Best Rock Song	"Berani Mati"	Ngarap Ka Nuan Nikal Pulai	Dayak Music Awards DAMA	Nominated
2017	Best Song	"Siku Dalam Seribu"	Ngarap Ka Nuan Nikal Pulai	Anugerah Carta Sapa Juara Wai FM	Runner up
2017	Best Performance	"Siku Dalam Seribu"	Ngarap Ka Nuan Nikal Pulai	Anugerah Carta Sapa Juara Wai FM	Won

== Discography ==
Masterpiece

- Merindang Ke Bintang (2009)
- Rock & Roll (2013)
- Ngap Sayot (2014)
- Ngarap Ka Nuan Nikal Pulai (2016)
- Ensera Paragon (2018)

Compilations & single

- Mansau Leka Padi (2011)
- Berami Ba Ati Nuan (2014)
- Nadai Ati Berami (2015)

== Other music compositions ==
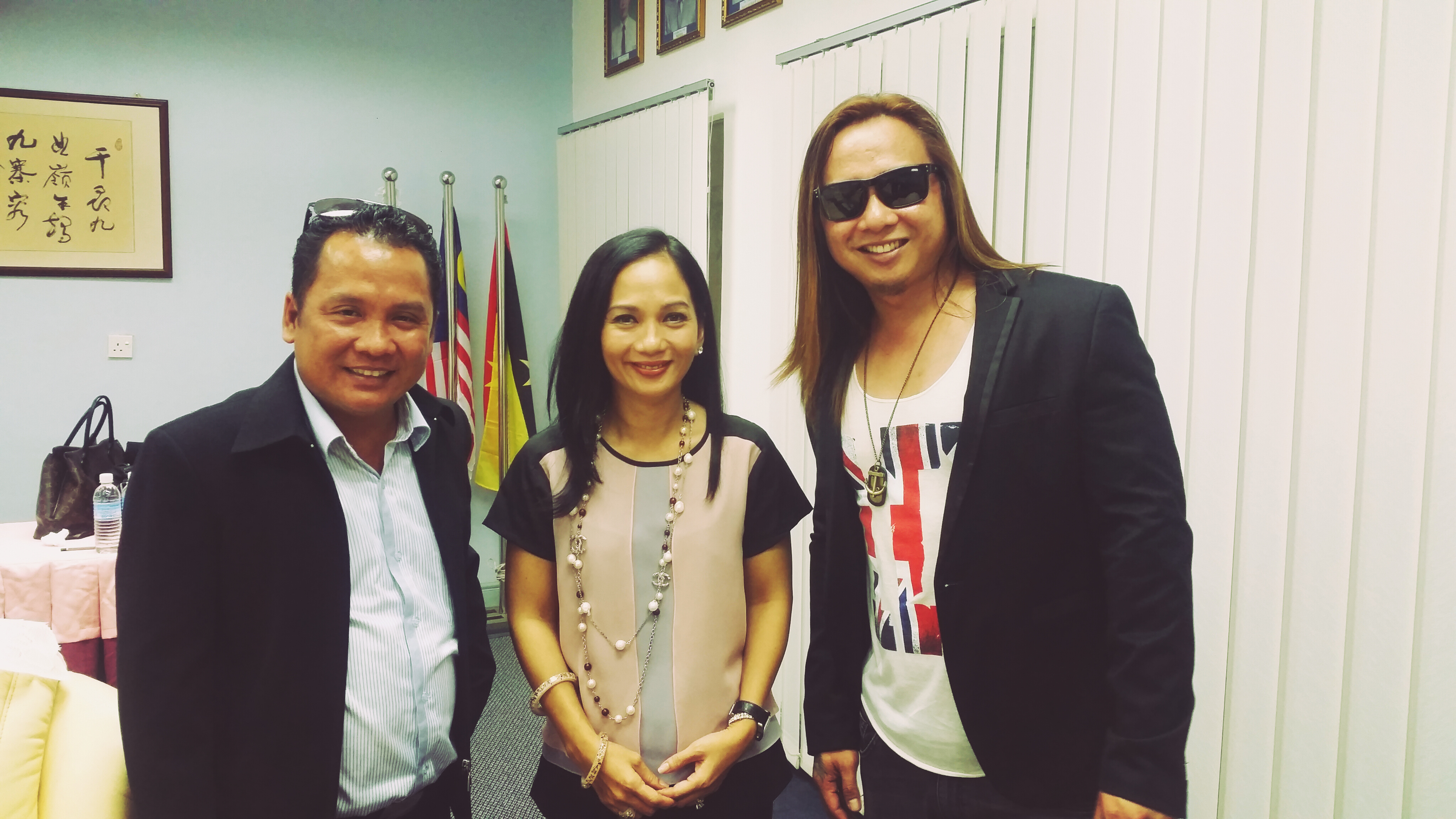
Depha masterpiece with music producer & Dato Sheila Majid

Song title	Artiste	Album / Category	Year	Role
I Love You Pengabis Ati	Hailey Robson ft Melissa Francis	Kumang	2012	Composer, songwriter
Begulai Baru	Hailey Robson	Kumang	2012	Composer, songwriter
Amu Mata	Hailey Robson	Kumang	2012	Composer, songwriter
Cerita Pengerindu Tua	Lyssa Jean	Single	2012	Lyricist
Enggai Saru Penemu	Melissa Francis	Enggai Saru Penemu	2013	Composer, songwriter
Sampai Mati	Depha Masterpiece	Single	2013	Lyricist, vocals
Pupus	Depha Masterpiece	Single	2013	Composer, songwriter, vocals
Patah Ati	Watt Rock	Patah Ati	2015	Composer, songwriter
Suyak (Surut)	Watt Rock	Patah Ati	2015	Composer, songwriter
Metropolitan	Watt Rock	Patah Ati	2015	Composer, songwriter
Selangkar Pintu Ati	Watt Rock ft Florence Lo	Patah Ati	2015	Composer, songwriter
Sapa Tua	Majestica	Simfoni Infiniti	2015	Composer, songwriter

== See also ==
- Masterpiece
