= Rocktoberfest Borneo =

Music festival in Malaysia

- Genre: Heavy metal; rock; hardcore; and related sub genres
- Dates: October
- Locations: Miri, Malaysia
- Years active: 2017 – present
- Founders: Northeastern Group
- Website: www.rocktoberfestborneo.com

Rocktoberfest Borneo is a music festival focusing on rock, heavy metal and hardcore music. It was held for the first time on 6 and 7 October 2017, at the beachfront of Park city Everly Hotel in Miri, Malaysia. Primarily focused on rock and metal on the two main stages, the 2017 Rocktoberfest Borneo edition featured some of Malaysia and Southeast Asia's influential rock music acts.

== History ==
The 2017 Rocktoberfest Borneo edition was made up of two-day festivals in Miri, Sarawak. Supported by the Miri City Council and Sarawak Tourism Board, Northeastern Group was responsible for the inception and organization of the festival, inviting over 30 bands, including acts from the Philippines, Singapore and Brunei.

== 2017 ==
=== Line up ===
Friday 6 October
Stage 1	Stage 2
Suri Mantra; Cotopaxi; Me Gusta; AMEF; Estranged; The Times AKA; Subculture; Monoloque; Oh Chentaku; XPDC	Underpressure; Polar; Rose On My Coffin Door; Republic Of Brickfields; Pesawat; Plaque Of Happiness; SOG; Kyoto Protocol; Slapshock

Saturday 7 October
Stage 1	Stage 2
Shizuka Ben Aman; Larrong; Falling Farewell; Saturday Heroes; Bunkface; Nicestupidplayground; Masterpiece; OAG; Masdo; Hujan	Wildhorse; Malex; Man Karen & Friends; BOIL; Seven Collar T-Shirt; Dirgahayu; Gerhana Skacinta; Maddthelin; Massacre Conspiracy; Koffin Kanser

== See also ==
- Rock festivals
