= Dunging script =

Writing system of the Iban language from Sarawak, Malaysia not Indonesia

Dunging script Urup Dunging
- Script type: Semisyllabary
- Creator: Dunging Anak Gunggu
- Period: 1947–present
- Direction: Left-to-right
- Languages: Iban (limited use)

The Dunging script or Iban script is a semi-alphabetic script used to write the Iban language of Sarawak. It was invented in 1947 by Dunging Anak Gunggu (1904–1985), who revised the initial 77 glyphs to the current 59 glyphs in 1962. It has not been used widely. In 2012, Dr. Bromeley Philip of Universiti Teknologi MARA began to promote the script again.

== History ==
Dunging Anak Gunggu did not attend any formal education before inventing the Dunging script. He taught himself on reading and writing in writing in Latin alphabet and some Jawi script. Dunging succeeded in teaching the script to his family members and a few friends. Later, Bagat Nunui, the former chief of Nanga Ulai longhouse (same longhouse as Dunging) decided to preserve the script. However, there was little interest from other members of his community. He was invited to teach the script at a school in Betong, but with little success. Since then, unsuccessful attempts were made to revive this script.

In 2010, extending Dunging's work, Dr. Bromeley Philip of Universiti Teknologi MARA (UiTM) Sarawak developed computer fonts for the Iban alphabet, called LaserIban. His aim is to help preserve the Iban alphabet in digital form in the modern world. The LaserIban is available for Windows and Macintosh computers and is completely cross-platform compatible. LaserIban however, is a legacy typeface encoded onto the Latin block of Unicode, thereby limiting its range of use in computers.
