= Merindang Ke Bintang =

Studio album by Masterpiece
- Released: 2009
- Recorded: Masterjam Records
- Genre: Hard rock
- Length: 30:02
- Label: Panggau Buluh Pengerindu Records

Masterpiece chronology
Merindang Ke Bintang (2009)	Rock & Roll (2013)

Singles from Merindang Ke Bintang
- 1. "Sinu" Released: 2009

Merindang Ke Bintang is the debut studio album by Malaysian rock band from Sarawak, the Masterpiece. It was released in 2009 through Masterjam Studio and re-released on Panggau Buluh Pengerindu Records in 2010. The album is the band's most popular album, receiving the Album of the Year award at the 2010 Dayak Music Awards in Kuching, Sarawak.

== Track listing ==
All tracks are written by Depha Masterpiece except "Kumang Mimpi" co-written by Roslee Qadir.

No.	Title	Length
1.	"Sinu"	4:24
2.	"Malam Malam"	6:36
3.	"Bulat Ati Ku"	4:18
4.	"Kumang Mimpi"	4:21
5.	"Nadai Benci"	6:07
6.	"Misteri"	4:56
Total length:		30:02

== Credits ==
Masterpiece

- Depha Masterpiece – vocals, songwriter
- Kennedy Edwin – guitars, vocals, backing vocals
- Willy Edwin – guitars, keyboards
- Watt Marcus – bass guitar
- Harold Vincent – drums

Guest musicians

- Daniel Ading – guitar outro on "Malam-Malam"

Production

- Recorded at Masterjam Studio and Fish Farm Record, Sarawak, Malaysia
- First released by Masterjam Studio and Fish Farm Record, Sarawak, Malaysia
- Final released by Panggau Buluh Pengerindu Records, Sarawak, Malaysia
- Engineered by Norman Ading
- Videography: Harry Frederick

== Awards ==
Year	Category	Nominated work	Awards	Result
2010	Most Popular Group	Masterpiece	Dayak Music Awards	Won
2010	Best Music Video	"Bulat Ati Ku"	Dayak Music Awards	Won
2010	Album of the Year	Merindang Ke Bintang	Dayak Music Awards	Won
2010	Best Album Cover	Merindang Ke Bintang	Dayak Music Awards	Won
2010	Best New Artist	Masterpiece	Dayak Music Awards	Won
2011	Song of the year	"Sinu"	AJARR Music Awards	Won
