= Ngap Sayot =

Studio album by Masterpiece
- Released: 2014
- Recorded: Masterjam Records
- Genre: Hard rock
- Length: 18:28
- Label: Do Records Entertainment

Masterpiece chronology
| Rock & Roll (2013) | Ngap Sayot (2014) | Ngarap Ka Nuan Nikal Pulai (2016) |

Singles from Ngap Sayot
- 1. "Ngap Sayot" Released: January 4, 2014

Ngap Sayot is the third studio album by Malaysian rock band from Sarawak, the Masterpiece. It was released in 2014 and their first released through Do Records Entertainment.

== Track listing ==
All tracks are written by Depha Masterpiece except for Sarawak Malay version; lyrics by Roslee Qadir.

| No. | Title | Length |
|---|---|---|
| 1. | "Ngap Sayot (Iban version)" | 4:33 |
| 2. | "Ngap Sayot (Sarawak Malay version)" | 4:34 |
| 3. | "Ngap Sayot (Minus One)" | 4:33 |
| 4. | "Ngap Sayot (Instrumental)" | 4:33 |
| 5. | "Ngap Sayot (Chant)" | 0:55 |
| Total length: | | 18:28 |

== Credits ==
Masterpiece

- Depha Masterpiece – vocals, songwriter
- Kennedy Edwin – guitars, vocals, backing vocals
- Willy Edwin – guitars, recording technician
- Roslee Qadir – keyboards, backing vocals
- Valentine Jimmy – keyboards
- Watt Marcus – bass guitar
- Harold Vincent – drums

Production

- Recorded at Masterjam Studio, Sibu, Malaysia
- Mixed and mastered at iMusik Studio, Sibu
- Chant version: Johnny Telson, Albert and Brodie William
- Engineered by Iskandar Bujang
- Artwork: Do Records Entertainment
- Publisher: Do Records Entertainment

== Awards ==
=== Dayak Music Awards ===
| Year | Nominee / work | Award | Result |
|---|---|---|---|
| 2016 | "Ngap Sayot" | Best Vocals | Won |
| 2016 | "Ngap Sayot" | Best Performance | Won |
