= Sinu (Masterpiece song) =

Single by Masterpiece

from the album Merindang Ke Bintang
- Released: 2009
- Recorded: 2008
- Length: 4:38 (album version)
- Label: Panggau Buluh Pengerindu
- Songwriter(s): Depha Masterpiece
- Producer(s): Embat Lala

Masterpiece singles chronology
"Malam-Malam" (2009)	"Sinu" (2009)	"Kumang Seari" (2013)

Music video
- "Sinu" on YouTube

"Sinu" is a song by the Iban rock band Masterpiece. It was released in 2009 as the lead single from their first studio album, Merindang Ke Bintang. "Sinu" was Masterpiece's major single which helped to place them in the Sarawak music scene and the song has been recognized as one of Masterpiece's signature songs and has been covered on numerous occasions and shows. It was produced by Embat Lala, who produced the entire album under his record label, Panggau Buluh Pengerindu Records. "Sinu" has won the "Best Song" awards at the Anugerah Carta Rentak Ruai AJARR awards ceremony, represented by Cats FM on 21 May 2011 in Kuching, Sarawak.

== Track listing ==
- "Sinu" (Album Version) - 4:38

== Music video ==
The music video (directed by Harry Frederick) were filmed in Beach Club Sibu features the band performing on a stage.
