= Masterpiece (band) =

Malaysian iban rock band

- Origin: Sarawak, Malaysia
- Genres: Hard rock; heavy metal
- Years active: 2003–present
- Labels: Warner Music; Masterjam; Panggau Buluh Pengerindu; Kaban Music Production (KMP) Sdn Bhd
- Members: Willy Edwin; Watt Marcus; Depha Masterpiece; Kennedy Edwin; Harold Vincent; Valentine Jimmy; Roslee Qadir
- Past members: Roni; Dellender Wilson; Timothy Umpok

Masterpiece is an Iban rock band, which formed in 2003 as Masterjam in Sibu, Sarawak best known for its hit singles, "Sinu", "Kumang Seari" & "Ngarap Ka Nuan Nikal Pulai". The band comprises vocalist Depha Masterpiece, lead guitarist Willy Edwin, guitarist Kennedy Edwin, bassist Watt Marcus, drummer Harold Vincent, keyboardist Valentine Jimmy and Roslee Qadir. The group was renamed Masterpiece in 2005 after Depha was hired as the band's new vocalist. Drummer Roni, keyboardist Dellender Wilson and Timothy are former members of the band.

Since its inception, Masterpiece has released five studio albums and three songs for Gawai various artist album compilations. The band achieved commercial success in Sarawak with the release of their first album, Merindang Ke Bintang, in 2009. The album has won numerous awards including the best produced debut album of 2009–2010 during the 2010 Dayak Music Awards. Its full-length follow-ups, the second albums Rock & Roll (2013), were also widely successful; which respectively debuted at number one on the local radio station for months.

Masterpiece's third album, Ngap Sayot (2014), was a commercial success, although not to the degree of their previous two albums. The band's mainstream success continued with Ngarap Ka Nuan Nikal Pulai (2016), which was critically praised, becoming their most nominated release to date. In December 2016, the lead single from the album, "Ngarap Ka Nuan Nikal Pulai" became the first Iban song to reach one million views on YouTube. The band fifth album, Ensera Paragon was released in August 2018 through their first major label, Warner Music Malaysia.

During the course of their career, Masterpiece has come to be regarded as one of the most influential and important Iban rock bands in Sarawak and has been recognised by several Sarawak Music Awards ceremonies; To date, the band has received fourteen awards from several nominations. Notable awards they have won include the Most Popular Group, voted by fans via SMS at the 2010 Dayak Music Awards and Best Rock Artist at the 2014 Dayak Music Awards.

== History ==
=== 2003–2008: Formation and early years ===
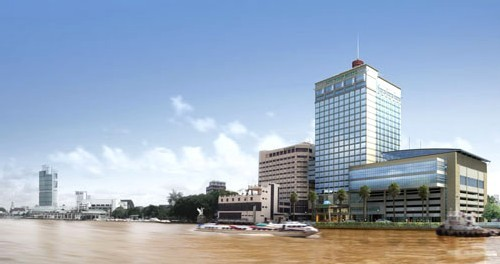
Masterpiece are based in Sibu, Sarawak, since the time of the group's creation in 2003.

In 2003, Willy Edwin and his brother Kennedy Edwin formed a band named Masterjam in their hometown of Sibu, Sarawak, with Kennedy on vocals and guitar, Willy on lead guitar and Roni on drums. Since they were missing a bass player, Watt Marcus joined them as a sessional live member who soon becomes their permanent bassist. The band travelled around playing several gigs with this line-up for about a year. In 2005, Kennedy brought a new focus to his guitar playing and the band was set to search for another vocalist.

After spending a considerable time searching for vocalist, Willy and Kennedy recruited former Black Monkey vocalist, Depha who was recommended by Marcus; the newborn vocal chemistry between Depha and Kennedy helped revive the band, inciting them to work on new material. With the band having their two vocalists together, they finally settled on the name "Masterpiece". The four original members remained together along with Roni until late 2005, when he left the band. They soon invited friend and schoolmate Harold Vincent to play drums. The band's line-up was completed when Dellender Wilson joined to take up keyboard duties.

Though limited in resources, the band began recording and producing songs within Willy's makeshift bedroom studio (known as Masterjam Studio) in 2007, resulting in a six-track demo; "Malam-Malam", "Sinu", "Kumang Mimpi", "Bulat Ati Ku", "Misteri" and "Nadai Benci", entitled Merindang Ke Bintang. After recording demos, the band started playing small bars in their hometown of Sibu. For a brief time in 2008, the band entered the studio for the first time, recording its first CD titled Merindang Ke Bintang. Keyboardist Dellender Wilson moved to Kuching sometime before the EP's completion and the band replaced him briefly with Timothy at the end of 2008 prior to the release of Merindang Ke Bintang.

=== 2009–2011: Merindang Ke Bintang and mainstream breakthrough ===
In April 2009, the band released Merindang Ke Bintang in CD format, which they circulated across Sibu city with the help of close friends and hoping to get signed to a record label. After facing numerous rejections from several record labels in Sarawak, Masterpiece turned to Embat Lala for additional help. Embat Lala the owner of Panggau Buluh Pengerindu Records helped the band to reissue the album with unsigned deal with the company before the end of 2009. The songs on Merindang Ke Bintang was re-mastered by Norman Ading at Norman Home Studio, formerly known as Fish Farm Records in Kuching. In an early promotional interview with The Borneo Post on 13 November 2009, the band said they produced a complete set of music videos for each song on the album (directed by Harry Frederick, Borneo Motion Picture) and to market them on DVD format. The band released its breakthrough album Merindang Ke Bintang in CD & DVD format, the following year through Panggau Buluh Pengerindu Records in Sarawak.

The songs on the album had been circulating across the music industry for a while. Two songs from the released, "Sinu" and "Bulat Ati Ku" has received increasing airplay and brought them to the top of the hit charts in Sarawak. On 8 November 2010, the band made their debut appearance at the Dayak Music Awards, during which the band performed "Sinu" and "Bulat Ati Ku" at Borneo Convention Centre, in Kuching, Sarawak. The album, Merindang Ke Bintang earned the band multiple awards—winning the Most Popular Group award, Best Music Video award for "Bulat Ati Ku", Best New Artist, Best Album Cover and the Album of the Year award. In an interview after the ceremony with The Borneo Post, Kennedy Edwin said "The most important thing is that the community accepts our music and continues to support the industry. All the nominees are great artists, some experienced and we are grateful to have won the awards".

In early 2011, the band continue on the street playing club shows as well as playing at Travillion carpark in Kuching, Sarawak, as part of the Dakar Rally auto show along with Choo Hao Ren, Claudia Geres and Hafiz Suib in March 2011. On 29 April 2011, in news released by The Borneo Post, it was announced that Masterpiece would be part of the album collaboration with Man Kidal and Ramli Sarip, which won some critical praise as the album sales would be donated for the purpose of building a music school in Kuching. However, the plan didn't work and the record deal ended up silent.

"I can see the encouraging developments since Masterpiece won the 2010 AJARR music awards. The emergence of more new music genre in the Iban music industry as well as the public is increasingly open to new music like us ..."

— Hevance vocalist Aldrich

Keyboardist Timothy left the group later in the year and was replaced by a temporary touring member, Valentine Jimmy who made his debut performance with the group at the AJARR Music Awards on 21 May 2011 in Kuching, Sarawak. The same night the band performed "Sinu" and winning the 2010 'Song of the Year award'. On 1 June 2011, Masterpiece released a song titled "Mansau Leka Padi" as part of a compilation for 2011 Gawai festival. It was the first time Masterpiece had issued a collaboration record with another artist from Panggau Buluh Pengerindu Records. The success of Merindang Ke Bintang led to numerous touring for the band, including a slot opening for Aizat Amdan in Kuching, Sarawak, on his Urusan Aizat Amdan-Borneo Tour in July 2011, and headlining the TM Net Festival in Sarawak, starting with Miri, Kuching and ending with Sibu In October 2011.

=== 2011–2013: Major exposure and Rock and Roll ===
For a brief time in 2011, Masterpiece returned to the recording studio to work on new material. Later that year, the band recruited keyboardist Roslee Qadir, an old school friend of Willy's and Kennedy's who had played with Willy in a band during their teens and started recording their second studio album. Roslee Qadir was eventually chosen as a permanent keyboardist and joined the band in time to take part in the tour that followed the release of "Badu". The song was released on 30 November 2011 which originally set as the lead single of their second studio album but was included instead in Gawai compilation album.

On 9 December 2011, Masterpiece were invited to perform at Stadium Perpaduan Kuching as part of the Konsert Rock Borneo Terbilang 2011 in direct support for Amy (Search's vocalist), on his solo Kuching show. Supporting performers on the concert included Stevenson, Ricky Andrewson and Winnie Albert. The same night Masterpiece and Amy shared the stage together for the first time. They played several of Search songs including "Isabella", "Pawana" and "Tiada Lagi". Shortly after, Masterpiece was selected to be the opening act for the Malaysian legendary rock band, Search, during their 30th anniversary Fenomena concert in Stadium Negeri Kuching, Sarawak in December 2011. It was the band debut on a high-profile concert, performed in front of 25,000 people . The following year, the band appeared at the Dayak Music Awards at DeTAR Putra theatre in Kuching. "Badu" received the Dayak Music Awards nomination for 'Best Music Arrangement'. The award went to Ethnic Transmission's song "Pulai Pengujung". Masterpiece continue working on a second album, titled Rock & Roll, in 2013, which included features touring keyboardist Valentine Jimmy who also had appeared to a lesser extent on Merindang Ke Bintang. Despite the recording happening when he were only tour members, it is the first Masterpiece release to Valentine Jimmy, and to have him credited as band member in the second album. While Depha once again wrote all the songs, the rest of the band collaborated on the arrangements. On 9 August 2013, the band released a new song entitled "Kumang Seari", as the official lead single of their second studio album. To accompany the song's release, a lyric video for "Kumang Seari" was released on Depha's YouTube channel.

On 22 September 2013, Masterpiece released its second album, Rock & Roll, through Panggau Buluh Pengerindu Records in Sarawak. The album consists of ten songs including closing track "Badu" which was re-mastered to a more accessible radio-friendly sound, with accompanying music videos directed by Cosmas Moses Alexander. The songs on the album was recorded at Masterjam Studio in Sibu, Sarawak, and featured guest musicians such as Jerry Kamit on sapeh instrument and Romy Majestica outro guitar solo on "Nyaga Negeri". Like the band's debut, it was engineered, mixed, and mastered by Norman Ading at Norman Home Studio in Kuching, Sarawak. The album also saw the band write some of their most challenging lyrics to date, the ninth track on the album, "Sembilan Bulan", meaning "Ninth Month" was written about child abandonment. While "Nyaga Negeri" was written as a tribute to the troops. Rock & Roll was also the first album to feature the band's logo on its cover, which was designed by Cosmas Moses Alexander. The lead single from the album, "Kumang Seari" earned the band its first VIMA Music Awards nomination in December 2013 for 'Best Rock Song', and winning their first 'Best Stage Performance' awards at the ACSJ Music Awards the following year.

=== 2013–2014: Ngap Sayot and recognition ===
In December 2013, the band announced a new single entitled "Ngap Sayot" and said they had been writing new material for an upcoming album. Prior to the release of the band's third album, Masterpiece released a single "Ngap Sayot" on 4 January 2014 through YouTube, which was released as a benefit single on iTunes and other Internet outlets, the following year. The song is known for its underlying riff, which plays throughout most of the song and largely eschews the hard rock influences found in Masterpiece's earlier work. Originally intended as an exclusive track for the forthcoming Malaysian League season and structured matches of the Sarawak FA team, it became a hit with Masterpiece fans who asked for it to be written in Sarawak Malay to emphasise the heritage nationalism in their music. Ngap Sayot is a colloquial Sarawakian phrase in football arena meaning "defeatable" which introduced by Sarawak FA new coach in 1988. The single was commercially used by the Sarawak FA largest supporters club, GB13 ultra, as background music for the promotional footage of their video. The cross-promotion video was released on 5 March 2014 via GB13 official YouTube channel. For a brief time in 2014, the band was headed to the studio to record their third full-length single album Ngap Sayot, which written in two different languages and multiple version tracks including chant and guitar instrumental version. While working on Ngap Sayot, Masterpiece released another song, titled "Berami Ba Ati Nuan" as part of the 2014 Gawai festival compilation through Panggau Buluh Pengerindu Records, on 23 April 2014. Shortly after the release of "Berami Ba Ati Nuan", the band continues recording material for Ngap Sayot. The recording took place over the following few weeks at Masterjam Studio. The album was mixed and mastered at the iMusik Studio in Sibu, by Iskandar Bujang and later releases were handled by DO Records Entertainment on 17 July 2014.

The band spent the following month on tour, including their first appearance at the Borneo Cultural Festival in Sibu, Sarawak, on 24 August 2014. Masterpiece performed "Ngap Sayot" and other songs from previous records at the Town Square main stage. This performance was attended by 1,000 people and also featured Metadomus from Indonesia, Space Band Company from Taiwan and many local stars during the concert. Ngap Sayot, did not match the success of their previous album, but received critical praise and the album brought them a new level of success. Masterpiece was recognised as the Rock Artist of the Year by Dayak Artists & Musicians Association (DAMA). The band awarded for 'Best Rock Artist' by the association at the Dayak Music Awards ceremony on 22 December 2014.

=== 2014–2016: Ngarap Ka Nuan Nikal Pulai ===
Masterpiece started recording their fourth studio album before the end of 2014. The band complete shooting the video for their first single from the fourth album, "Ngarap Ka Nuan Nikal Pulai" meaning "I hope you will come back" in November 2014 and although not released on the following month. The music video (directed by Brodie William) was filmed at Tumbina Park in Bintulu. The song "Ngarap Ka Nuan Nikal Pulai" eventually released on 2 January 2015 and aired within the same week in Sarawak. This was followed by the release of "Nadai Ati Berami" which was written and recorded for their yet-to-be released album but it was included instead in 2015 Gawai festival compilation album on 2 May 2015. Despite initially stating the new album would debut sometime in 2015 shortly after the single's release, the album was delayed until 2016. That same year, while working on the album, Masterpiece participated in a benefit concert at the Christian Ecumenical Centre, Kuching, in aid of ailing Search drummer Yazid Ahmad.

On 6 February 2016, the band revealed the album artwork via the band's official sources. Their fourth album consists of ten tracks and titled Ngarap Ka Nuan Nikal Pulai reflecting the lead single from the album. The album was recorded, mixed, and mastered between November 2014 and August 2015 at Masterjam Studio and iMusik Studio in Sibu, Sarawak, the same studio as the band's previous album, Ngap Sayot. The album's cover featured Watt Marcus standing back side holding his bass guitar looking at the bride in a wedding dress at a mirror. Later that month, Masterpiece announced that the new album will be released around March 2016 and saw them reunite with Panggau Buluh Pengerindu Records.

In an interview with The Borneo Post on 21 March 2016, the band had announced that the Ngarap Ka Nuan Nikal Pulai album was made available for pre online order from 10 March 2016 and officially released throughout Sarawak and Johor music outlets on 21 March 2016. The album also features a guest artist and musician from Sarawak, such as Nai from Dinamik band on flute for "Anak" intro and the Akademi Fantasia 2015 finalist, Alyssa Joanne or known as Lyssa Jean contributing her vocals in a duet song titled "Siku Dalam Seribu". The band also revealed that they will be hitting the studio again to work on new materials and planning to release new single before the end of 2016.

On 2 September 2016, the lead single from the fourth album, "Ngarap Ka Nuan Nikal Pulai" won the award for "Best Song" at the 2016 ACSJ Music Awards. The following month, the band appeared at the 2016 Dayak Music Awards in Kuching. The fourth album, Ngarap Ka Nuan Nikal Pulai receiving the Album of the Year award, while one song from the release "Berani Mati", was nominated for "Best Rock Song" but lost the award to "Paded" by Mezzavoce. Masterpiece also performed "Ngap Sayot" at the award ceremony on 29 October. The same night the band won another two awards for "Best Vocalist" (Depha) and "Best Performance" ("Ngap Sayot"). The band as a whole said, "We are very proud that our work has been recognized and well received by our supporters. Thank you to the Dayak Artists and Musicians Association for granting us these awards that will further motivate us to do our best in the Dayak music scene."

=== 2016–present: Ensera Paragon ===
Following announcements from the group that they will be working on new material in early 2016, the band released a music video for the upcoming album's first single, titled "Kaban" meaning "Friend" on 19 October 2016 through YouTube via their independent label, Masterjam Studio. The song was released as a digital download single on the same day. The single was written by Depha, while the music video, directed by Kennedy Edwin, combines parts of the band's candid footage while on tour around Sarawak and in the studio between July and September 2016.

On 8 December 2016, the band announced that they had begun working on their fifth studio album since October 2016, consisting of nine tracks including "Kaban" and planned to be released in 2017. Depha has said of the album "We will be using the same method and genre for the rest of the songs except for few rock numbers, which is going to sound heavier than our previous songs. But we still maintain the album weight, balancing it with a number of rock ballad too and of course will be working hard on it to maintain the quality of the whole album soon". However, despite the band's fifth album title has been confirmed and finalised, Masterpiece stated that they will reveal it at a later date.

On 5 August 2017, the band released "Perecha" as the second single from their upcoming album, with its music video being directed by Kennedy Edwin and was released on Depha's YouTube channel. The following month, the band made their third appearance at the 2017 ACSJ Music Awards, in Betong, Sarawak. One song from their previous album, "Siku Dalam Seribu" was nominated for ‘Best Song’. Despite winning the 'Best Stage Performance' award, "Siku Dalam Seribu" was announced as the first runner-up for the 'Best Song' category and the award went to Taju Remaong's song "Pengerindu Aku Enda Bebagi". On 7 October, the band appeared at the Rocktoberfest Borneo for the first time at Park City beachfront in Miri, Sarawak, performing to an audience of more than 10,000. Masterpiece played at the main stage alongside other well known rock acts such as Slapshock, Nicestupidplayground, Hujan, Bunkface and Estranged.

On 12 January 2018, Masterpiece revealed in an interview with The Borneo Post that the new album would be called Ensera Paragon (Paragon Tales), in addition unveiling the final track list including singles "Kaban" and "Perecha". Depha further said that seven new songs were recorded at Masterjam Studio and engineered by Iskandar Bujang at iMusik studio, Sarawak. The band also announced that the album will be released on digital music stores in 2018 as well as on CD via their independent label, Masterjam. The album, Ensera Paragon was officially released for streaming and digital download on 28 August 2018 through Warner Music Malaysia. On 9 September 2018, the band released a lyric video for the song "Daliyah".

== Musical style ==
Masterpiece's music is a mixture of hard rock, power ballad and heavy metal elements, with its multi-layered, harmonic vocals and its melodic guitar riffs. However, even though they were often considered one of the most influential hard rock Iban band in Sarawak, the band were associated with the growing power ballad scene, mainly due to their mainstream interest and glossy production. Masterpiece was perceived to shift from their trademark in addition to pressuring the band to adopt a more mainstream sound.

With the release of Rock & Roll , the band displayed power ballad and early heavy metal influences, incorporating more rhythm and harmony in song structures. Ngap Sayot marked another large change in the band's sound adopting a more progressive guitar riff and a distinct sound of the strings from the album. The band used drop D tuning. Their early album Merindang Ke Bintang appealed to Sarawak rock music fans and influenced the likes of Creed, Nickelback and Bon Jovi.

All of Masterpiece's lyrics were written by Depha, while all seven members—as a band—were credited with writing the music. The lyrics on the first two Masterpiece albums mainly touch on hope and overcoming grief, sadness, pain and regret. Although the lyrics of Masterpiece generally are serious with an unusual amount of personal meanings, they have also produced several less serious songs, including "Bulat Ati Ku", "Terebai", "Déjà vu", "Nyawa Aja Tanya", "Nyaga Negeri" and "Ngap Sayot". The band has only written songs in Iban, with the only exceptions being "Ngap Sayot" from the third album, which is in Sarawak Malay version.

== Awards and nominations ==
Masterpiece has received fourteen awards from several nominations in Sarawak Music Awards ceremonies. The band has received nine awards from the Dayak Music Awards—Winning the Album of the Year two times for Merindang Ke Bintang in 2010 and Ngarap Ka Nuan Nikal Pulai in 2016. The group also won the 'Best Rock Artist' awards in 2014. "Sinu", from Merindang Ke Bintang has won the 'Song of the Year' awards at the 2011 AJARR Music Awards while "Ngarap Ka Nuan Nikal Pulai" from the fourth album, winning the same category at the 2016 ACSJ Music Awards. Masterpiece also won the 'Best Stage Performance' award three times—"Kumang Seari" in 2014, "Ngap Sayot" in 2016 and "Siku Dalam Seribu" in 2017. The song "Kumang Seari", received the 'Best Rock Song' award nomination at the 2014 VIMA Music Awards.

== Band members ==
Current members

- Willy Edwin – lead guitars, backing vocals (2003–present)
- Kennedy Edwin (Kent) - guitars, vocals, backing vocals (2003–present)
- Watt Marcus – bass (2003–present)
- Depha – lead vocals, songwriter (2005–present)
- Harold Vincent – drums (2005–present)
- Valentine Jimmy (Emek) – keyboards (Touring 2011–2012; official 2013–present)
- Roslee Qadir – keyboards, piano, backing vocals (2011–present)

Former members

- Roni – drums (2003–2005)
- Dellender Wilson – keyboards (2005–2008)
- Timothy Umpok – keyboards (2008–2011)

Guest appearances

- Jerry Kamit – sapeh (Nyawa Aja Tanya – 2011)
- Romy Salvador – guitars (Nyaga Negeri outro – 2011)
- Daniel Ading – guitars (Malam-malam outro – 2009)
- Nai Dinamik – flute (Anak – 2016)
- Alyssa Joanne – vocals (Siku Dalam Seribu – 2016)
- Pierce Lee Wen Yian – guitars (Carut Mentaliti – 2018)
- Josephine Jurie Kubu – vocals (Diva Enigma – 2018)

== Discography ==
- Merindang Ke Bintang (2009)
- Rock & Roll (2013)
- Ngap Sayot (2014)
- Ngarap Ka Nuan Nikal Pulai (2016)
- Ensera Paragon (2018)
- Redak Seribu (2020)
- Tangga Ke Langit (2021)
- Bechiping Pengerindu (2022)
- Diputuskan featuring Estranged (2023)
- Taja Semalam Aja (2023)
- Teguh (2024)
- Menyadi (2024)

== See also ==
- List of hard rock musicians (A–M)
- List of hard rock musicians (N–Z)
- List of awards and nominations in Sarawak
