= Ngarap Ka Nuan Nikal Pulai (song) =

Single by Masterpiece

from the album Ngarap Ka Nuan Nikal Pulai
- Released: January 2, 2015
- Recorded: 2014
- Length: 5:08 (album version); 4:44 (radio edit)
- Label: Panggau Buluh Pengerindu
- Songwriter: Depha Masterpiece
- Producer: Embat Lala

Masterpiece singles chronology
"Kumang Seari" (2013)	"Ngarap Ka Nuan Nikal Pulai" (2015)	"Kaban" (2016)

Music video
- "Ngarap Ka Nuan Nikal Pulai" on YouTube

Ngarap Ka Nuan Nikal Pulai meaning "I hope you will come back" is a song recorded by Sarawak rock band Masterpiece. It was released in January 2015 as the lead single of their fourth album Ngarap Ka Nuan Nikal Pulai. The song was released by Do Records Entertainment while the entire Ngarap Ka Nuan Nikal Pulai album was produced by Panggau Buluh Pengerindu Records on 12 March 2016.

On 2 September 2016, "Ngarap Ka Nuan Nikal Pulai" has won the "Best Song" award at the ACSJ 2016 Sarawak Music Awards and the album has received the "Album of The Year" award at the AMD 2016 Sarawak Music Awards ceremony on October 29.

== Track listing ==
- "Ngarap Ka Nuan Nikal Pulai" (Album Version) – 5:08
- "Ngarap Ka Nuan Nikal Pulai" (Radio Edit) – 4:44

== Music video ==
The first version of the music video was filmed in Bintulu, Sarawak, by Brodie William, director of Do Records Entertainment while the Album version was filmed and directed by Cosmas Moses from Panggau Buluh Pengerindu Records in Sibu, Sarawak.
