= Watt Marcus =

- Born: 26 November 1973 (age 52); Sibu, Sarawak
- Genres: Hard rock; heavy metal
- Occupation: Musician
- Instrument: Bass guitar
- Years active: 2003–present
- Labels: Warner Music, Masterjam, (PBP) Panggau Buluh Pengerindu

Watt Marcus (born 26 November 1973) is a Malaysian rock musician best known as the bass guitarist of the Bornean hard rock band Masterpiece. Marcus joined Masterpiece in 2003 as the band's bassist, with whom he achieved mainstream success in the late 2000s.

== Personal life ==
Watt Marcus was born on 26 November 1973 and raised in the town of Sibu, Sarawak.

== Career ==
=== Masterpiece (2003–present) ===
Marcus is a former bass player for a semi-regular touring rock band named Black Monkey from Sibu, Sarawak, along with the band's current lead vocalist, Depha. In 2003, while he is still playing for Black Monkey, he was approached by a founding member of Masterpiece, Willy Edwin and his brother Kennedy Edwin to join the band as a session bass player. He has since become a permanent member of the band and responsible for the bassline on all released albums by the band.

== Discography ==
Masterpiece

- Merindang Ke Bintang (2009)
- Rock & Roll (2013)
- Ngap Sayot (2014)
- Ngarap Ka Nuan Nikal Pulai (2016)
- Ensera Paragon (2018)

Compilations & single

- "Mansau Leka Padi" (2011)
- "Berami Ba Ati Nuan" (2014)
- "Nadai Ati Berami" (2015)
