= Cats FM =

- Kuching; Malaysia
- Broadcast area: Sarawak, Brunei, Indonesia and part of Sabah
- Frequency: Varies depending on its region

Programming
- Languages: Malay; Iban
- Format: Contemporary hit (CHR); Easy listening; Indie rock music; Modern pop music

Ownership
- Owner: Kristal Harta Sdn. Bhd.

History
- First air date: 8 August 1996; 30 years ago
- Former names: CATS Radio

Links
- Website: www.catsfm.my

Cats FM is a private FM radio station airing from Jalan Bako, Kuching, Sarawak, Malaysia. The station covers areas of Sarawak and Brunei. It currently broadcast in Malay and Iban only. The station has aired programmes in English and Mandarin Chinese.

Cats FM is Sarawak's first private radio station.

== Special programs ==
=== Pantun Sarawak (Bermukun) ===
It is announced in February 2011 that Cats FM will re-air the traditional Pantun Sarawak after an absence of two years. The Pantun Sarawak also known as bermukun or berpantun is a Sarawakian art, not only confined to the Malays but also to other ethnics as well. The program airs every Friday from 9.30pm-11pm, with presenters Cassie and Wan KAK.

=== CATS Exposed ===
CATS Exposed is a segment that features Sarawakian acts that aired since 2008. Interested acts may send the radio their demos and the radio then will air their songs. Also, on Sundays (11 a.m) there is a chart program that features these local acts.

=== Anugerah Juara Rentak Ruai (AJARR) ===
Ajarr is an annual song competition organised by Cats FM since 2008. The competition is equivalent to Anugerah Juara Lagu organised by TV3. List of past winners of Best Song of AJARR are as following;

Year	Song title	Singer
2009	Berperang Dalam Petang	Winnie Albert
2010	Sinu	Masterpiece
2011	Aku Nemu (I Know)	Hevance
2012	Genggam Jariku (Hold My Hands)	Gabriel Fairuz Louis

=== 19th anniversary celebration ===
On 7 August 2015, the station celebrated its 19th anniversary by airing a 19-hour marathon. The marathon highlighted Cats FM achievements and how much it has grown since 1996. The program aired from 5 pm on 7 August and ended at noon on 8 August 2015.

=== Kumang Gawai pageant ===
In 2017, Cats FM organised its inaugural CATS Kumang Gawai Darlie 2017 beauty pageant in collaboration with Darlie. The pageant is held in conjunction with Gawai Dayak celebration.

== Frequencies ==
- 99.3 MHz (Kuching, Serian & Kota Samarahan)
- 88.7 MHz (Sri Aman & Betong)
- 88.4 MHz (Sibu)
- 99.9 MHz (Selangau & Kanowit)
- 93.3 MHz (Miri)
- 88.3 MHz (Bintulu)
- 88.7 MHz (Limbang)
- 97.9 MHz (Mukah & Dalat)
- 96.7 MHz (Sarikei & Daro)
- 88.2 MHz (Lawas)
- 107.6 MHz (Kapit & Song)
- 99.5 MHz (Belaga)
- 88.2 MHz (Lawas & Sipitang, Sabah)

=== Online ===
Cats FM can also be listened online at .

=== Mobile ===
Cats FM app is also available on Google Play and Apple App Store.
