= Ngarap Ka Nuan Nikal Pulai =

Studio album by Masterpiece
- Released: 2016
- Recorded: Masterjam Records
- Genre: Hard rock
- Length: 47:46
- Labels: Masterjam Records, Panggau Buluh Pengerindu Records

Masterpiece chronology
| Ngap Sayot (2014) | Ngarap Ka Nuan Nikal Pulai (2016) |

Singles from Ngarap Ka Nuan Nikal Pulai
- 1. "Ngarap Ka Nuan Nikal Pulai" Released: 2 January 2015

Ngarap Ka Nuan Nikal Pulai is the fourth studio album by Malaysian rock band from Sarawak, the Masterpiece. The album consists of ten tracks and titled Ngarap Ka Nuan Nikal Pulai reflecting the lead single title from the album. It was released on 21 March 2016 through Panggau Buluh Pengerindu in Sarawak and Johor. The album receiving the 'Album of the Year' award at the 2016 Dayak Music Awards while the lead single "Ngarap Ka Nuan Nikal Pulai" has won the 'Song of the Year' award at the 2016 ACSJ Music Awards.

== Track listing ==
All tracks are written by Depha Masterpiece.

| No. | Title | Length |
|---|---|---|
| 1. | "Sakam" | 4:43 |
| 2. | "Berani Mati" | 4:37 |
| 3. | "Siku Dalam Seribu" | 5:50 |
| 4. | "Enda Aci Lah" | 4:03 |
| 5. | "Nuan Enggau Aku" | 5:50 |
| 6. | "Anak" | 5:32 |
| 7. | "Drama Ku Ingat" | 4:37 |
| 8. | "Ngarap Ka Nuan Nikal Pulai" | 4:44 |
| 9. | "Badasman" | 5:06 |
| 10. | "Nadai Ati Berami" | 4:54 |
| Total length: | | 47:46 |

== Credits ==
Masterpiece

- Depha Masterpiece – vocals, songwriter
- Kennedy Edwin – guitars, vocals, backing vocals
- Willy Edwin – guitars, recording technician
- Roslee Qadir – keyboards, backing vocals
- Valentine Jimmy – keyboards
- Watt Marcus – bass guitar
- Harold Vincent – drums

Guest musician

- Nai Dinamik - flute for "Anak"

Guest singer

- Lyssa Jean - "Siku Dalam Seribu"

Production

- Recorded at Masterjam Studio, Sibu, Malaysia
- Mixed and mastered at iMusik Studio, Sibu
- Engineered by Iskandar Bujang
- Artwork: Cosmas Moses Alexander
- Photography: Cosmas Moses Alexander
- Videography: Cosmas Moses Alexander & Brodie William @ DO Records Entertainment
- Producer: Embat Lala, Panggau Buluh Pengerindu Records, Sibu

== Awards ==
=== Dayak Music Awards ===
| Year | Nominee / work | Award | Result |
|---|---|---|---|
| 2016 | Ngarap Ka Nuan Nikal Pulai | Album of the Year | Won |
| 2016 | "Berani Mati" | Best Rock Song | Nominated |
| 2016 | "Nuan Enggau Aku" | Best Music Video | Nominated |
| 2016 | Ngarap Ka Nuan Nikal Pulai | Best Album Cover | Nominated |

=== Anugerah Carta Sapa Juara (ACSJ) Awards ===
| Year | Nominee / work | Award | Result |
|---|---|---|---|
| 2016 | "Ngarap Ka Nuan Nikal Pulai" | Song of the Year | Won |
| 2017 | "Siku Dalam Seribu" | Song of the Year | Runner up |
| 2017 | Masterpiece & Lyssa Jean | Best Performance | Won |
