= Rock & Roll (Masterpiece album) =

Studio album by Masterpiece
- Released: 2013
- Recorded: Masterjam Records
- Genre: Hard rock
- Length: 51:25
- Label: Panggau Buluh Pengerindu Records

Masterpiece chronology
| Merindang Ke Bintang (2009) | Rock & Roll (2013) | Ngap Sayot (2014) |

Singles from Rock & Roll
- 1. "Kumang Seari" Released: August 9, 2013

Rock & Roll is the second studio album by Malaysian rock band from Sarawak, the Masterpiece. It was released in 2013.

== Track listing ==
All tracks are written by Depha Masterpiece.

| No. | Title | Length |
|---|---|---|
| 1. | "Nyawa Jak Tanya" | 3:50 |
| 2. | "Kumang Seari" | 5:46 |
| 3. | "Aku Benci" | 3:54 |
| 4. | "Gaun Putih" | 6:21 |
| 5. | "Deja Vu" | 4:14 |
| 6. | "Terebai" | 6:38 |
| 7. | "Nyaga Negeri" | 5:38 |
| 8. | "Intan Enggau Batu" | 5:56 |
| 9. | "Sembilan Bulan" | 6:57 |
| 10. | "Badu" | 4:51 |
| Total length: | | 51:25 |

== Credits ==
Masterpiece

- Depha Masterpiece – vocals, songwriter
- Kennedy Edwin – guitars, vocals, backing vocals
- Willy Edwin – guitars, recording technician
- Roslee Qadir – keyboards, backing vocals
- Valentine Jimmy – keyboards
- Watt Marcus – bass guitar
- Harold Vincent – drums

Guest musicians

- Jerry Kamit – sapeh on "Nyawa Jak Tanya"
- Romy Salvador - guitar outro on "Nyaga Negeri"

Production

- Recorded at Masterjam Studio, Sibu, Malaysia
- Mixed and mastered at Norman Home Studio, Kuching
- Engineered by Norman Ading
- Artwork: Cosmas Moses Alexander
- Photography: Cosmas Moses Alexander
- Videography: Cosmas Moses Alexander
- Producer: Embat Lala, Panggau Buluh Pengerindu Records, Sibu

== Awards ==
| Year | Category | Nominated work | Awards | Result |
|---|---|---|---|---|
| 2014 | Best Rock Song | Kumang Seari | Voice Independent Music Awards Malaysia | Wild Card |
| 2014 | Best Rock Song | Kumang Seari | Voice Independent Music Awards Asia | Nominated |
| 2014 | Song of the Year | Kumang Seari | ACSJ Music Awards | Nominated |
| 2014 | Best Performance Awards | Masterpiece | ACSJ Music Awards | Won |
| 2014 | Best Rock Artiste | Masterpiece | Dayak Music Awards | Won |
