= Kumang Seari =

Single by Masterpiece

from the album Rock & Roll
- Released: 2013
- Recorded: 2012
- Length: 5:47 (album version)
- Label: Panggau Buluh Pengerindu
- Songwriter(s): Depha Masterpiece
- Producer(s): Embat Lala

Masterpiece singles chronology
"Sinu" (2009)	"Kumang Seari" (2013)	"Ngarap Ka Nuan Nikal Pulai" (2016)

Music video
- "Kumang Seari" on YouTube

"Kumang Seari" is a song by Iban rock band Masterpiece. It was written by Depha, produced by Masterjam Studio, and included on their second studio album Rock & Roll and later releases were handled by Panggau Buluh Pengerindu Records. "Kumang Seari" was nominated for 'Best Rock Song' at the VIMA Music Awards in 2013.

In June 2014, the single was nominated for 'Best Song' at the ACSJ Music Awards ceremony. The same night the band performed "Kumang Seari" and won the 'Best Performance' awards.

== Track listing ==
- "Kumang Seari" (Album Version) - 5:47

== Music video ==
The music video (directed by Cosmas Moses) were filmed in Sibu features the band performing at night between the standalone building and a narrow vacant lots.
