= Sarawak Music Awards =

Music awards in Malaysia

- Awarded for: Outstanding achievements in the Sarawak music & entertainment industry
- Country: Malaysia
- Presented by: Dayak Artistes and Musicians Association (DAMA), Cats FM, Sarawak Radio Televisyen Malaysia
- First award: 2008
- Website: www.rtmsarawak.gov.my, www.catsfm.my

Television/radio coverage
- Network: RTM, Cats FM

Sarawak Music Awards is a music award held in the Malaysian state of Sarawak. It is divided into three major events that are given the most attention by the fans, media, and record companies in Sarawak. Shortlisted as the Anugerah Musik Dayak (AMD) awards, Anugerah Juara Rentak Ruai (AJARR) awards and the Anugerah Carta Sapa Juara (ACSJ) awards. Presented by different organization dedicated to promoting the diversity of music in Sarawak and to acknowledging the talents and contributions of the local entertainer.

The first music award is the Anugerah Juara Rentak Ruai (AJARR) presented annually by Cats FM radio station, a subsidiary of Kristal Harta Sdn Bhd since 2003 until 2012, with the support of the Ministry of Tourism Sarawak . The nominations were based on the first 12 songs which have been ranked at No 1 with the longest durations accumulated in twelve months and the winner will be judged by a group of professional jury. The second music awards, Anugerah Musik Dayak (AMD) - Dayak Music Awards ceremony was held in 2008 in Kuching, Sarawak and continuously presented on every two consecutive years. The awards program was founded by Snowdan Lawan and managed by a nonprofit organization, Dayak Artistes and Musicians Association (DAMA). The third music awards is the Anugerah Carta Sapa Juara (ACSJ) awards which is wholly owned and staged by the Sarawak Radio Televisyen Malaysia. From its inception in 2014 until 2017, the ACSJ awards ceremonies have been held in Dewan Datuk Amar Stephen Kalong Ningkan Betong, Sarawak on 21 June 2014, 19 September 2015, 2 September 2016 and 23 September 2017.

== List of ceremonies by year ==
Event	Year	Venue	City	Host	Category
Anugerah Juara Rentak Ruai	2003	Riverside Majestic Hotel	Kuching	Cats FM	TBA
Anugerah Juara Rentak Ruai	2004	Riverside Majestic Hotel	Kuching	Cats FM	TBA
No ceremony held	2005				
No ceremony held	2006				
No ceremony held	2007				
Anugerah Musik Dayak	2008	Riverside Majestic Hotel	Kuching	Dayak Artistes and Musicians Association	TBA
Anugerah Juara Rentak Ruai	2009	CATS FM's Multipurpose Hall	Kuching	Cats FM	TBA
Anugerah Juara Rentak Ruai	2010	Stadium Perpaduan Negeri Kuching	Kuching	Cats FM	8
Anugerah Musik Dayak	2010	Borneo Convention Centre Kuching	Kuching	Dayak Artistes and Musicians Association	21
Anugerah Juara Rentak Ruai	2011	Sibu Civic Centre	Sibu	Cats FM	8
Anugerah Juara Rentak Ruai	2012	Sibu Civic Centre	Sibu	Cats FM	8
Anugerah Musik Dayak	2012	Borneo Convention Centre Kuching	Kuching	Dayak Artistes and Musicians Association	19
No ceremony held	2013				
Anugerah Musik Dayak	2014	Borneo Convention Centre Kuching	Kuching	Dayak Artistes and Musicians Association	19
Anugerah Carta Sapa Juara	2014	Dewan Datuk Amar Stephen Kalong Ningkan	Betong	Sarawak Radio Televisyen Malaysia	3
Anugerah Carta Sapa Juara	2015	Dewan Datuk Amar Stephen Kalong Ningkan	Betong	Sarawak Radio Televisyen Malaysia	5
Anugerah Carta Sapa Juara	2016	Dewan Datuk Amar Stephen Kalong Ningkan	Betong	Sarawak Radio Televisyen Malaysia	7
Anugerah Musik Dayak	2016	Borneo Convention Centre Kuching	Kuching	Dayak Artistes and Musicians Association	20
Anugerah Carta Sapa Juara	2017	Dewan Datuk Amar Stephen Kalong Ningkan	Betong	Sarawak Radio Televisyen Malaysia	7

== Accolades received by artistes ==
Artist(s)	Solo	Group / Duo	Song language	Ceremonies
Gabriel Fairuz Louis	10		Iban	AJARR 2012, AMD 2012, AMD 2014
Masterpiece		14	Iban	AJARR 2010, AMD 2010, ACSJ 2014, AMD 2014, ACSJ 2016, AMD 2016, ACSJ 2017
Melissa Francis	8		Iban	AJARR 2011, AMD 2012, ACSJ 2015, AMD 2016
Eddie Kuwing	4		Orang Ulu, Iban	AJARR 2010, AMD 2010
Clement Joys	3		Iban	AMD 2010
Hevance		3	Iban	AJARR 2011, AJARR 2012, AMD 2012
Lucy M.	3		Iban	AJARR 2010, AJARR 2011, ACSJ 2014
Rickie Andrewson	3		Iban	AJARR 2010, AJARR 2011, ACSJ 2015
Rosiana Urai	3		Orang Ulu, Iban	AJARR 2010, AJARR 2012, AMD 2012
The Crew		3	Iban	AMD 2014, ACSJ 2014
Ethnic Transmission		2	Iban	AJARR 2011, AMD 2012
Hailey Robson	2		Iban	AJARR 2010, AJARR 2012
Jerry Kamit	2		Iban	AJARR 2003, AMD 2014
Ranee Pat	2		Iban, Bidayuh	AMD 2012, AMD 2014
Romina Grey Melvin	2		Bidayuh	AMD 2010, AMD 2012
Stevenson	2		Iban	AJARR 2010, AMD 2012
Taju Remaong		4	Iban	AJARR 2012, AMD 2012, ACSJ 2016
Winnie Albert	2		Iban	AJARR 2009, AMD 2010
Alon Lupeng	1		Iban	AJARR 2011
Belden Damu	1		Bidayuh	AMD 2010
Calhiem Sawin	1		Bidayuh	AMD 2014
Christopher Kelly	1		Iban	AMD 2014
Claudia Geres	1		Bidayuh	AMD 2010
D’Sound-Tech Studio		1	Orang Ulu	AMD 2012
Donny Lang	2		Iban	AMD 2012, ACSJ 2016
Edward Sayu	1		Bidayuh	AMD 2012
Eisner Nala	1		Iban	ACSJ 2015
Embat Lala & Janang Ensiring		1	Iban	AMD 2014
Embat Lala & Lerry Silas		1	Iban	AMD 2010
Embat Lala, Monica Elen & Harry Usup Umbar		1	Iban	AMD 2016
Florence Lo	1		Iban	ACSJ 2015
Harry Usup Umbar	1		Iban	AMD 2012
Henry Anyi Ajang	1		Orang Ulu	AMD 2014
Hypersonic		1	Bidayuh	AMD 2010
Jackson Dana	1		Iban	AJARR 2011
Jenny Tan	1		Iban	AJARR 2012
Johnny Tuk	1		Bidayuh	AMD 2010
Julia Empayer	1		Bidayuh	AMD 2012
Kelabu Papau	1		Iban	ACSJ 2015
Lydia Mike	1		Bidayuh	AMD 2010
Maxwell Franklin Saran	1		Iban	AJARR 2004
Michael Jemat	1		Iban	AMD 2012
Mike Rantai	1		Bidayuh	AMD 2014
Monica Elen	1		Iban	AMD 2014
Nai Dinamik	1		Iban	AJARR 2010
Norman Ading	1		Iban	AMD 2014
Ronney Bukong	1		Iban	AMD 2014
Rosiana Urai & Dom Romeo		1	Iban	AMD 2010
Senah Ukong	1		Orang Ulu	AMD 2010
Seventh Tribe GMP		1	Iban	AMD 2014
Spitfire		1	Bidayuh	AMD 2010
Tuah Jili	2		N/A	AJARR 2012, ACSJ 2016
Ukum Mering	1		Orang Ulu	AMD 2012
Wilbert Kamit & Hasaliza		1	Iban	AJARR 2004
Karen Libau	5		Iban	ACSJ 2016, AMD 2016
Philip Jabu	1		Iban	ACSJ 2016
Mezzavoce		1	Iban	AMD 2016
Michael Gayut	2		Iban	AMD 2016
Hairee Francis	1		Iban	AMD 2016
Harrington Suring William	1		Iban	AMD 2016
Masan Kaya	1		Iban	AMD 2016
Ezra	1		Iban	AMD 2016
Carrie Geres	1		Iban	AMD 2016
Lake Himang Anyie	1		Iban	AMD 2016
Antonio Jawi	1		Iban	AMD 2016
Cindy Nifkiman Ahid	1		Iban	AMD 2016
Zachery Francis Ubu	1		Iban	AMD 2016
Watt Rock	1		Iban	ACSJ 2017
Eyqa Saiful	2		Iban	ACSJ 2017
Lyssa Jean		1	Iban	ACSJ 2017
Kunatak		1	Iban	ACSJ 2017

== Anugerah Juara Rentak Ruai (AJARR) - AJARR Awards ==
Sarawak music awards organized by Cats FM since 2003. The following is a list of the winner by category.

=== AJARR 2003 ===
Anugerah Juara Rentak Ruai (AJARR) 2003 results
Category	Winner	Nominated work
Best Song	Jerry Kamit	Flora

=== AJARR 2004 ===
Anugerah Juara Rentak Ruai (AJARR) 2004 results
Category	Winner	Nominated work
Best Song	Wilbert Kamit & Hasaliza	Segulai Sejalai
Best Performance	Maxwell Franklin Saran	Baka Perahu Patah Kemudi

=== AJARR 2009 ===
Anugerah Juara Rentak Ruai (AJARR) 2009 results
Category	Winner	Nominated work
Best Song	Winnie Albert	Beperang Dalam Petang

=== AJARR 2010 ===
Anugerah Juara Rentak Ruai (AJARR) 2010 results
Category	Winner	Nominated work
Best Song	Masterpiece	Sinu
Most Popular Song	Lucy M.	Dendam Enda Padam
Most Popular Song (Runner-up)	Hailey Robson	Semina Tinggal Janji
Most Popular Song (Third)	Stevenson	Telih Diati Bedarah Dimata
Best Vocal	Rickie Andrewson	Lagu Lama Aku Suba
Best Performance	Rosiana Urai	Terumpang Pelepa Pengerindu
Special awards (Non-Iban Artistes Award)	Eddie Kuwing	N/A
Special awards (Jury awards)	Nai Dinamik	N/A

=== AJARR 2011 ===
Anugerah Juara Rentak Ruai (AJARR) 2011 results
Category	Winner	Nominated work
Best Song	Hevance	Aku Nemu
Most Popular Song	Melissa Francis	Mutus Ati
Most Popular Song (Runner-up)	Lucy M.	Buya Bepangan
Most Popular Song (Third)	Rickie Andrewson	Engkerecam Cuka
Best Vocal	Melissa Francis	Mutus Ati
Best Performance	Ethnic Transmission	Pulai Pengujung
Special awards (Non-Iban Artistes Award)	Alon Lupeng	N/A
Special awards (Jury awards)	Jackson Dana	N/A

=== AJARR 2012 ===
Anugerah Juara Rentak Ruai (AJARR) 2012 results
Category	Winner	Nominated work
Best Song	Gabriel Fairuz Louis	Genggam Jariku
Most Popular Song	Hevance	Bajik
Most Popular Song (Runner-up)	Hailey Robson	Kumang
Most Popular Song (Third)	Gabriel Fairuz Louis	Genggam Jariku
Best Vocal	Taju Remaong	Enda Sanggup
Best Performance	Rosiana Urai	Ngarapka Bisi Tedai Pengerindu
Special awards (Non-Iban Artistes Award)	Tuah Jili	N/A
Special awards (Jury awards)	Jenny Tan	N/A

== Anugerah Musik Dayak (AMD) - Dayak Music Awards ==
Music awards for Dayak musicians and entertainer in Sarawak organized by Dayak Artistes and Musicians Association (DAMA) since 2008. The following is a list of the winner by category excluding the 2008 AMD results.

=== AMD 2010 ===
Anugerah Musik Dayak (AMD) 2010 results
Category	Winner	Nominated work
Album of the Year	Masterpiece	Merindang Ke Bintang
Best New Artiste	Masterpiece	Merindang Ke Bintang
Best Album Cover	Masterpiece	Merindang Ke Bintang
Best Music Video	Masterpiece	Bulat Ati Ku
Most Popular Duo/Group	Masterpiece	Merindang Ke Bintang
Best Group/Duo	Rosiana Urai & Dom Romeo	Terumpang Pelepa Pengerindu
Best Male Vocal	Belden Damu	Spitfire
Bidayuh Album of the Year	Spitfire	Jilap Apui
Bidayuh Best Album Cover	Hypersonic	Hypersonic
Best Female Vocal	Claudia Geres	Claudia Geres
Best New Artiste (Bidayuh)	Johnny Tuk	Johnny Tuk
Song of the Year (Iban)	Clement Joys	Entara Dua
Song of the Year (Orang Ulu)	Senah Ukong	Melu Habong Ika
Song of the Year (Bidayuh)	Lydia Mike	Bujang Serian
Best Patriotic Song (Iban)	Embat Lala & Lerry Silas	Aram Semua
Best Patriotic Song (Orang Ulu)	Eddie Kuwing	Sarawak Maju Dalem Malaysia
Most Popular Dayak singer (male)	Clement Joys	N/A
Most Popular Dayak singer (female)	Winnie Albert	N/A
Most Popular Song (Iban)	Clement Joys	Entara Dua
Most Popular Song (Bidayuh)	Romina Grey Melvin	Bersendiri Lagi
Most Popular Song (Orang Ulu)	Eddie Kuwing	Oba Ke Aya
The Best Dressing/Fashion (male)	Eddie Kuwing	N/A

=== AMD 2012 ===
Anugerah Musik Dayak (AMD) 2012 results
Category	Winner	Nominated work
Album of the Year	Gabriel Fairuz Louis	Gabriel Fairuz Louis
Album of the Year (Bidayuh)	Edward Sayu	Edward Sayu
Album of the Year (Orang Ulu)	D’Sound-Tech Studio	D’Sound-Tech Studio
Best Album Cover	Donny Lang	Donny Lang
Best New Artiste	Gabriel Fairuz Louis	Genggam Jariku
Best Male Artiste	Gabriel Fairuz Louis	Gabriel Fairuz Louis
Best Female Artiste	Melissa Francis	Melissa Francis
Best Ballad Artiste	Melissa Francis	Berserara Enggau Ai Mata
Best Rock Artiste	Stevenson	Stevenson
Best Pop Artiste	Rannee Pat	Rannee Pat
Best Group/Duo	Taju Remaong	Taju Remaong
Song of the Year (Iban)	Hevance	Aku Nemu
Song of the Year (Orang Ulu)	Rosiana Urai	Mapuh Tageng Taji
Song of the Year (Bidayuh)	Romina Grey Melvin	Bintue Taap Bauh
Best Lyrics	Harry Usup Umbar	Berserara Enggau Ai Mata
Best Music arrangement	Ethnic Transmission	Pulai Pengujung
Lifetime Achievement Award (Iban)	Michael Jemat	N/A
Lifetime Achievement Award (Bidayuh)	Julia Empayer	N/A
Lifetime Achievement Award (Orang Ulu)	Ukum Mering	N/A

=== AMD 2014 ===
Anugerah Musik Dayak (AMD) 2014 results
Category	Winner	Nominated work
Album of the Year	Gabriel Fairuz Louis	Gabriel Fairuz Louis
Best Pop Artiste	Gabriel Fairuz Louis	Gabriel Fairuz Louis
Best Ballad Artiste	Gabriel Fairuz Louis	Gabriel Fairuz Louis
Song of the Year (Iban)	Gabriel Fairuz Louis	Genggam Jariku
Song of the Year (Bidayuh)	Ranee Pat	Ambujanji Tarigas
Best Male Artiste	Gabriel Fairuz Louis	Gabriel Fairuz Louis
Best Female Artiste	Monica Elen	Monica Elen
Best New Artiste	The Crew	The Crew
Best Rock Artiste	Masterpiece	Rock & Roll
Best Group/Duo	The Crew	The Crew
Best Album Cover	Ronney Bukong	Ronney Bukong
Best Music Video	Calhiem Sawin	Calhiem Sawin
Best Lyrics	Janang Ensiring & Embat Lala	Pelandai Ujan Nerusan
Best Music arrangement	Norman Ading	Agi Sayau
Best Dayak Single Award	Seventh Tribe GMP	Nuan Di Atiku
Lifetime Achievement Award (Iban)	Christopher Kelly	N/A
Lifetime Achievement Award (Bidayuh)	Mike Rantai	N/A
Lifetime Achievement Award (Orang Ulu)	Henry Anyi Ajang	N/A
AMD Special Award	Jerry Kamit	N/A

=== AMD 2016 ===
Anugerah Musik Dayak (AMD) 2016 results
Category	Winner	Nominated work
Best Album (Iban)	Masterpiece	Ngarapka Nuan Nikal Pulai
Best Vocals Duo/Group	Masterpiece	Ngap Sayot
Best Performance	Masterpiece	Ngap Sayot
Most Popular Song	Melissa Francis	Sepenuh Nyawaku
Best Ballad Song	Melissa Francis	Sepenuh Nyawaku
Best Song (Iban)	Melissa Francis	Andau Pengerindu
Best Pop Song	Karen Libau	Karam Ba Ati
Best New Artiste	Karen Libau	Karam Ba Ati
Best Female Vocals	Karen Libau	Karam Ba Ati
Best Rock Song	Mezzavoce	Paded
Best Single	Michael Gayut	Kubur Cinta
Best Male Vocals	Michael Gayut	Kubur Cinta
Best Lyrics	Embat Lala, Monica Elen & Harry Usup Umbar	Benang Emas
Best Music arrangement	Hairee Francis	Sepenuh Nyawaku
Best Music Video	Harrington Suring William	Sullivan
Best Album Cover	Masan Kaya	Sullivan
Best Album (Bidayuh)	Ezra	Ezra
Best Song (Bidayuh)	Carrie Geres	Tenggie Ku
Lifetime Achievement Awards	Lake Himang Anyie, Antonio Jawi & Cindy Nifkiman Ahid	N/A
AMD Special Award	Zachery Francis Ubu	N/A

== Anugerah Carta Sapa Juara (ACSJ) - ACSJ Awards ==
Music awards for Dayak musicians and entertainer in Sarawak organized by Sarawak Radio Televisyen Malaysia since 2014. The following is a list of the winner by category.

=== ACSJ 2014 ===
Anugerah Carta Sapa Juara (ACSJ) 2014 results
Category	Winner	Nominated work
Best Song Award	The Crew	Nadai Agi
Best Vocal Award	Lucy M.	Kelalu Laun
Best Performance Award	Masterpiece	Kumang Seari

=== ACSJ 2015 ===
Anugerah Carta Sapa Juara (ACSJ) 2015 results
Category	Winner	Nominated work
Best Song Award	Melissa Francis	Pengerindu Tua
Best Vocal Award	Florence Lo	Ai Mata Lelengau
Best Performance Award	Eisner Nala	Penyayau Tebeleka Ketegal Pemula
Most Favorite Artist Award	Rickie Andrewson	Rickie Andrewson
Most Sporting Artist Award	Kelabu Papau	Kelabu Papau

=== ACSJ 2016 ===
Anugerah Carta Sapa Juara (ACSJ) 2016 results
Category	Winner	Nominated work
Best Song Award	Masterpiece	Ngarapka Nuan Nikal Pulai
Second place	Taju Remaong	Sepuluh Jari
Third place	Karen Libau	Karam Ba Ati
Best Vocal Award	Karen Libau	Karam Ba Ati
Best Performance Award	Tuah Jili	Enda Tan Agi
Most Favourite Artist Award	Donny Lang	Donny Lang
Most Sporting Artist Award	Philip Jabu	Setengah Mati Sayau Ka Nuan

=== ACSJ 2017 ===
Anugerah Carta Sapa Juara (ACSJ) 2017 results
Category	Winner	Nominated work
Best Song Award	Taju Remaong	Pengerindu Aku Enda Bebagi
Second place	Masterpiece & Lyssa Jean	Siku Dalam Seribu
Third place	Eyqa Saiful	Padamka Nama Aku
Best Vocal Award	Watt Rock	Nujah Duri Menasan Puntan
Best Performance Award	Masterpiece & Lyssa Jean	Siku Dalam Seribu
Most Favourite Artist Award	Eyqa Saiful	Eyqa Saiful
Most Sporting Artist Award	Kunatak	Kunatak

== Other award ceremonies ==
=== Bidayuh Music Festival ===
Bidayuh Music Festival presented by the Bidayuh Artistes and Musicians Association (Bama). The event had considered for a music award that would have similar categories to the Anugerah Musik Dayak (AMD) and the first ceremony was held in 2015 in Serian with the support of Serian District Council (SDC).

== See also ==
- Iban people
- Dayak people
