= Kennedy Edwin =

- Also known as: Kent Masterpiece
- Born: Kennedy Edwin Anak Ganai; 13 September 1976 (age 50); Kanowit, Sibu, Sarawak, Malaysia
- Genres: Hard rock; heavy metal
- Occupations: Musician, singer
- Instruments: Guitar, vocals
- Years active: 2003–present
- Labels: Warner Music, Masterjam, (PBP) Panggau Buluh Pengerindu
- Member of: Masterpiece

Kennedy Edwin Anak Ganai (born 13 September 1976) is an Iban language Malaysian musician who serves as the rhythm and vocals for hard rock band Masterpiece. Along with his brother Willy Edwin, he is one of the founding members of Masterpiece, and has since released five studio albums with the band.

== Career ==
=== Masterpiece (2003–present) ===
Kennedy Edwin is a founding member of the Bornean hard rock band Masterpiece (Masterjam 2003–2005). He formed the band with his brother Willy Edwin (lead guitar) in 2003 along with Watt Marcus and Roni joining as bassist and drummer, respectively. Edwin was the lead singer for the band until 2005, when he began to focus on his guitar playing, he and Willy recruited Depha as the vocalist for the band. To date, Edwin still sang and played guitar on the tours associated with the band.

== Discography ==
Masterpiece

- Merindang Ke Bintang (2009)
- Rock & Roll (2013)
- Ngap Sayot (2014)
- Ngarap Ka Nuan Nikal Pulai (2016)
- Ensera Paragon (2018)

Compilations & single

- "Mansau Leka Padi" (2011)
- "Berami Ba Ati Nuan" (2014)
- "Nadai Ati Berami" (2015)
