= Willy Edwin =

- Born: Willy Edwin Anak Ganai; 4 December 1974 (age 51); Kanowit, Sibu, Sarawak
- Genres: Hard rock; heavy metal
- Occupations: Musician, music programmer
- Instruments: Lead guitar; acoustic guitar
- Years active: 2003–present
- Labels: Warner Music, Masterjam, (PBP) Panggau Buluh Pengerindu
- Member of: Masterpiece

Willy Edwin Anak Ganai (born 4 December 1974) better known by his stage name Will Masterpiece, is a Malaysian rock musician best known as the co-founder and the primary lead guitarist of the Bornean hard rock band Masterpiece, with whom he achieved mainstream success in the late 2000s. Edwin co-founded Masterpiece, formerly known as Masterjam with his brother Kennedy Edwin in 2003, and has since released five studio albums with the band. Like the other left-handed guitarist, Edwin had the instrument strung upside-down with the high E on the top.

== Personal life ==
Willy Edwin was born on 4 December 1974 in Kanowit, and raised in the town of Sibu, Sarawak. He is married to his college sweetheart Ayuyahti A and blessed with four children.

== Career ==
=== Masterpiece (2003–present) ===
Willy Edwin is a founding member of the Bornean hard rock band Masterpiece. He formed the band with his brother Kennedy Edwin (lead vocals/rhythm guitar) in 2003 along with Watt Marcus and Roni joining as bassist and drummer, respectively.

== Discography ==
Masterpiece

- Merindang Ke Bintang (2009)
- Rock & Roll (2013)
- Ngap Sayot (2014)
- Ngarap Ka Nuan Nikal Pulai (2016)
- Ensera Paragon (2018)

Compilations & single

- "Mansau Leka Padi" (2011)
- "Berami Ba Ati Nuan" (2014)
- "Nadai Ati Berami" (2015)
