= Iban language =

Austronesian language spoken in Brunei, Kalimantan, and Sarawak

Iban
- Jaku Iban
- Native to: Brunei, Indonesia, Malaysia
- Region: Borneo
- Ethnicity: Iban
- Native speakers: 2,450,000 (2019); 1,900,000 L2 speakers in Malaysia (2019)
- Language family: Austronesian: Malayo-Polynesian; Malayo-Sumbawan (?); Malayo-Chamic-BSS (?); Malayic; Ibanic; Iban
- Writing system: Latin, Dunging

Official status
- Regulated by: Tun Jugah Foundation; Ministry of Education Malaysia; Dayak Cultural Foundation

Language codes
- ISO 639-2: iba
- ISO 639-3: iba
- Glottolog: iban1264
- Iban is the majority language where vast majority are first language speakers Iban is a minority language

An Iban speaker, recorded in Malaysia

The Iban language (jaku Iban) is spoken by the Iban, one of the Dayak ethnic groups who live in Brunei, the Indonesian province of West Kalimantan and in the Malaysian state of Sarawak. It belongs to the Malayic subgroup, a Malayo-Polynesian branch of the Austronesian language family.

Iban has reached a stage of becoming a koiné language in Sarawak due to contact with groups speaking other related Ibanic languages within the state. It is ranked as Level 5 (i.e. "safe") in term of endangerment on Expanded Graded Intergenerational Disruption Scale (EGIDS). Since 2024, the Iban language is included in Google Translate under Malaysia domain.

== Classification ==
Iban comes from the Ibanic language group spoken in Sarawak, West Kalimantan, and Brunei within Borneo island. part of the Malayic subshoot of the Malayo-Polynesian branch in the Austronesian language family. The Malayic languages originate from western Borneo, thus Iban is closely related to Malay, especially the Sarawakian dialect. Other isolects in the Ibanic group of languages are Sebuyau, Mualang, Kantu, and Seberuang. These groups of languages can be identified by the word-final position in certain lexical forms of /-ai/. These lexical forms are similar to other Malayic languages with lexical forms of /-an/, /-ang/, or, less frequently, /-ar/.

The Iban language is also related to other dialects such as Sebuyau, Kendayan, Balau and Selaku.

== History ==
According to the oral history of the Iban people, Benedict Sandin, in 1968, plotted the ancestry of the Iban people as descendants from the Kapuas Hulu Range, the border of Sarawak-Kalimantan. The Iban people arrived in Sarawak in the 16th century, and settled in the regions of Batang Lupar drainage basin and Undop river in southern Sarawak. From there, they migrated north, east, and west, and expanded into Saribas, Batang Sadong, Batang Layar, and Batang Lupar rivers. In the 1800s, they moved into the Rajang basin (middle region of Sarawak) from Batang Lupar river, Katibas river, and Saribas river (Saribas is a tributary of the Rajang River). By 1870s, they had reached Mukah and Oya rivers. In the early 1900s, they reached Balingian, Tatau, and Kemena rivers (near Bintulu). They also reached the Baram area and Limbang rivers around the same time in northern Sarawak and would become the largest ethnic group in Sarawak.

=== Brooke administration ===
Fearing that the Iban tribes outnumbered the pre-existing local tribes with detrimental environmental effects on lands intended for shifting cultivation, the Brooke government restricted the Iban people from further migration to other river systems such as the Baleh river. However, the Brooke government allowed the Ibans to settle in other areas such as Lundu, Balingian, Bintulu, Limbang and Baram to consolidate the government's authority there. As a result of this policy, several minority ethnic groups such as Bukitans living along the Batang Lupar River were assimilated into the Iban people, thus contributing to the growth of Iban tribe and the expansion of the Iban language in the state. The Iban language was taught in schools in the 1940s during the Brooke era.

=== 1958-1977: Borneo Literature Bureau (BLB) foundation ===
During the period of Crown Colony of Sarawak, the Iban language was used in government official letters, courts, announcements, and notices. Radio Sarawak, started by the British, offered Iban language programmes. The Iban language, known under the name of "Asian language", was offered as an examination subject in the Sarawak Junior Certificate. The "Asian language" was renamed to "Iban language" in 1963. Borneo Literature Bureau (BLB) was founded by the British in 1958 to collect and document oral Iban literature. BLB published more than 60 Iban language books during its lifetime until 1973 when it was replaced by a Malaysian federal government agency Dewan Bahasa dan Pustaka (DBP) in 1977. After that, the publication of books in Bornean languages came to a halt. The publication of the Nendak (name of an omen bird) magazine, which was started by BLB in 1967 also came to a halt. Jimbun Tawai, the former vice chairman of Sarawak Dayak Iban Association, called this period under Crown Colony as "golden era" of the Iban language.

=== 1977-2000s post BLB closure ===
After the closure of BLB, other smaller publishers continue in this niche such as the Kuching-based publishing company named Klasik. Examples of works include ensera (Iban epic story) and cherita kelulu (morality novellas). Christian churches such as the Catholic church publish prayer books that adopt certain aspects of Iban adat (culture). Thus, Christian texts bear greater significance as cultural repositories of the Iban language when to compared to other genres after the demise of BLB.

State-sponsored media such as Berita Rakyat was founded in 1974 and ended in the 1990s. The magazine was started by Rajang Security Command (RASCOM) in Sibu to defeat the communists' activities in the Rajang basin. The magazine stopped publication after the cessation of the communist insurgency in Sarawak in 1990. The state government's information department published another magazine named Pembrita and aimed to provide developmental news to the rural Iban populace, such as exemplary longhouses, lucrative cash crops, and animal husbandry. The magazine also called on the rural Ibans to modernise their ways of farming. There were no Iban newspapers in the 1990s and early 2000s. The high cost of imported paper materials and low advertising revenues contributed to the difficulties of Iban newspaper publishing.

The Tun Jugah Foundation was established in 1985 after the death of Jugah Barieng, paramount chief of the Iban, to record the oral history of the Iban people, producing Iban dictionaries and surveys of the rural-urban migration of the Iban people.

Radio Televisyen Malaysia (RTM) expanded their Iban radio broadcasts to 10 hours on Sundays and 9 hours on rest of the week by the 1980s as WaiFM Cats FM is the first commercial radio station to broadcast in Iban opening in 1997.

The Iban language was included in the primary school curriculum in 1968 and a few secondary schools in 1988. From 1968 to 1969, teachers' training colleges offered Iban as an elective subject. It was only in 1988 that Iban was formalised as part of the Malaysian national curriculum. There are no Iban-medium schools in Sarawak. In 2008, Iban was taught as an elective language subject in Malaysian Form 5 secondary schools for the Sijil Pelajaran Malaysia (SPM) certificate examination. A survey done in Sarawak in 2008 showed that a total of 367 primary schools and 55 secondary schools have taught the Iban subjects since 1968. The number of primary schools offering the Iban language subject increased to 1,264 in 2015, while the number of secondary schools reduced to 52 in 2015. Most schools have a significant Iban population in the Kapit, Sibu, Sri Aman, and Sarikei Divisions. The Iban language subject is also offered in undergraduate programmes in two teachers' institutions in Sarawak. In Sultan Idris Education University, Perak, the Iban language is offered as a minor subject for Iban students majoring in Malay studies. The introduction of Iban language subjects in schools results in the standardisation of Iban language spelling, dialect, and pronunciation from regional variations.

In 2003, Malaysian federal authorities banned the Iban-language Bible or Bup Kudus as its use of the word "Allah" for God overlaps with the use of Allah as the name of God in Islam. While Christianity is the majority faith of the Iban, Islam has official federal status, which the government argues can "confuse" the Muslim populace in the state. The ban was lifted by the then deputy prime minister Abdullah Ahmad Badawi after persistent protests.

=== 2010-present: emergence of vernacular mass media ===
Newspapers The Borneo Post and Utusan Borneo started Iban language sections in 2010 and 2014 respectively. The Borneo Post stopped the Iban section in 2017. A monthly Iban magazine named Pegari was also published by a small company named PEGARI Iban Production from 2012 to 2018. Borneo Media Solutions, a subsidiary of PEGARI Iban Production, also published several books in Iban language.

RTM opened their first Borneo-oriented channel TVi in 2011 which later became TV Okey in 2018 which includes a 30-minute Iban news slot. TV Sarawak started the Iban language section in October 2020. Iban language support was added to Malaysian domain of Google Translate in 2024.

== Extent of use ==
The Iban language is allowed in the Sarawak State Legislative Assembly with the special permission from the Speaker and simultaneous interpretations will be provided during the assembly sitting and when written into the Hansard.

Rentap's battle cry while fighting against James Brooke in 1860s “Agi Idup, Agi Ngelaban!” (“I will fight as long I will live!”) is adopted by Sarawak Royal Ranger Regiment as their motto. The battle cry is also used in speeches and car stickers to evoke the warrior spirit of the Iban people. The word "Oo-ha", an Iban call for celebration, was popularised by the former chief minister of Sarawak Adenan Satem as a form of "hello" before giving speeches in order to motivate a crowd. The Chinese-predominant Sarawak United Peoples' Party used the Iban word "Sa'ati" (United) as their party slogan. Another Chinese-predominant Sarawak Democratic Action Party has been using the Iban language to garner support from the Iban population. Other words include "Segulai sejalai" (going together) that was selected as the slogan for Malaysian national unity, and "Ngap Sayot" (literally means "eat vegetables") used by Sarawak FA football team battle cry to signify taking down opponents just like eating vegetables.

Iban churches in Sarawak conduct services in the Iban language.

Trades in the Sarawak bazaars are also frequently conducted in the Iban language.

== Phonology ==
=== Consonants ===
Iban has the following consonant inventory:

Iban consonants
		Labial	Alveolar	Palatal	Velar	Glottal
Nasal		m	n	ɲ ⟨ny⟩	ŋ ⟨ng⟩	
Plosive/ Affricate	voiceless	p	t	tʃ ⟨c(h)⟩	k	ʔ
Plosive/ Affricate	voiced	b	d	dʒ ⟨j⟩	ɡ ⟨g⟩	ʔ
Fricative			s			h
Lateral			l			
Rhotic			r			
Approximant		w		j ⟨y⟩		

=== Vowels ===
Iban has a six-vowel system, with five cardinal vowels plus schwa:

Iban vowels
	Front	Central	Back
Close	i		u
Mid	e	ə	o
Open		a	

Vowel sounds are nasalized when preceded by a nasal consonant.

== Grammar ==
Lexical roots can be expanded by many affixes in Iban, as exemplified here with the verb gagai.

- gagai 'chase'
- begagai 'chasing/playing with each other'
- begagaika 'chasing something/someone'
- ngagai 'to chase'
- digagai 'being chased by'
- dipegagaika 'being chased by many'
- pengagai 'chaser'
- tegagaika 'outrun/outpace'

There are four types of affixes in Iban, namely prefixes, suffixes, circumfixes and infixes.

Type of noun affixes	Affix	Example of root word	Example of derived word
Prefix	pe-	mangah (angry)	pemangah (hot tempered)
	pen-	datai (arrive)	penatai (arrival)
	penge-	rindu (love) (verb)	pengerindu (love) (noun)
	be-	reta (property, possessions)	bereta (rich)
	bepe-	rindang (entertained)	beperindang (being entertained)
	beke- bete	kitang (hang)	bekekitang (hanging in group)
	ke-	rimpak (break)	kerimpak (broken pieces)
	m- n- me- nge- nye	panduk (cooked)	manduk (cooking)
	di-	sium (kiss)	disium (being kissed)
	dipe-	jaku (word, talk)	dipejaku (being talk about, gossiped)
	se-	iku (tail)	seiku, siku (one (person))
	sepe(m)-	panjai (long)	sepemanjai (as long as, measurement of long)
	te-	indik (footstep)	terindik (accidentally stepping on something)
Infix	⟨er⟩	titik (drip)	teritik (dripping)
Suffix	-ka	pasuk (wear)	pasukka (wear) (command)
	-i	garam (salt)	garami, gerami (marinade)
Circumfix	ng-...-kn	ayah (waste)	ngayahka (wasting, playing)
	be-...-ka	kena (hit, for)	bekenaka (wears)

Other examples:

- Sayau 'love'
- Dikesayauka 'was loved by'
- Penyayau 'affection'
- Kiruh 'busy'
- Ngiruhka 'to make someone busy'
- Pengiruh 'preoccupied'
- Pengiruh-ngiruh 'really preoccupied'
- Enjuk 'give'
- Berenjuk 'giving each other' (present)
- ngenjuk
- Dienjuk 'gave' (past)
- Deka ngenjuk 'will be given' (future)
- Pengenjuk 'giver'
- Kangau 'call'
- Bekangau 'calling each other' (present)
- Ngangau 'calling' (present)
- Dikangau 'was called' (past)
- Deka dikangau 'will be called' (future)
- Pengangau 'caller'

=== Personal pronouns ===
Iban has separate words for inclusive and exclusive we, and distinguishes singular, dual, and plural.

		singular	dual	plural
1st person	exclusive	aku	kami səduai	kami
1st person	inclusive	---	tua	kitai
2nd person		deʔ noan	deʔ səduai noan səduai	kitaʔ
3rd person		iya	səduai	sidaʔ

Sample

- Ke nuan 'for you'
- Ke aku 'for me'
- Ke kami 'for us'
- Bup aku 'my book'
- Bakih aku 'my friend'
- Apai aku 'my father'
- Gamal nuan 'your look'
- Sulu nuan 'your beloved'
- Sekula kami 'our school'
- Ke pangan aku 'for my beloved'
- Ke anak aku 'for my child'
- Ari indai di 'from your mother'
- Ari bakih aku 'from my friend'

Pronouns are primarily put after subjects.

=== Possessive pronouns ===
Iban	English
engku	mine
enggi di, ngedi	your
enggi iya, ngi'ya	his/her
enggi tua	ours (both of us)
engkita	belong to all of you
enggi sida	theirs

Sample phases:

- baju tu engku 'This shirt is mine.'
- Tu enggi nuan 'This is yours.'
- Siti nyin enggi tua 'That one belongs to both of us.'

=== Demonstrative determiners ===
There are three demonstrative determiners in Iban. Tu 'this, these' is used for a noun which is generally near to the speaker, nya 'that, those' is used for a noun which is generally far from the speaker, and nyin, which is the furthest from the speaker.

Pronoun	Iban	English
tu	bup tu	This book, these books
nya	ukui nya	That dog, those dogs
nyin	bungai nyin	That (furthest) flower(s)

These words can also act as demonstrative pronouns where they can stands on theirs own, replacing rather than modifying a noun.

Example:

- Nyamai tu. 'This is good.'
- Ok meh nya. 'That's ok.'
- Peda di nyin dih. 'Look at that.'

=== Demonstrative pronouns ===
In Iban, demonstrative pronouns are words that show which person or thing is being referred in relation to the location of the addressee to the speaker. There are three demonstrative pronouns in Iban depending on location to the speaker. They can only be used to refer to an addressee (human) and cannot be used to refer to inanimate objects.

Demonstrative pronouns
	Form	Gloss
Proximal	iya tu	this person
Medial	iya nya	that person
Distal	iya nyin	the other person (furthest)

Examples:

- Nama gaga iya tu baka nya? 'Why is this person acting in such a way?'
- Kini ke iya nya tadi? 'Where is he going?' (Referring to the second closest person to the speaker)
- Ni iya nyin tadi dih? 'Where is the other (person) one?' (referring to third person which is the furthest from the speaker)

=== Adverbs ===
==== Demonstrative adverbs ====
Demonstrative adverbs in Iban are closely related to the demonstrative pronouns in Iban grammar. For example, corresponding to the demonstrative pronouns are the adverbs such as kitu ('going here'), kia ('going there') and kin ('going there (farthest)') equivalent adverbs corresponding to the demonstrative pronoun this are tu, nya and nyin.

Demonstrative adverbs
	Form	Gloss
Proximal	kitu	going here
Medial	kia	going there
Distal	kin	going there, going yonder

Examples:

- Kitu nuan. 'Come here (you).'
- Kini di kia? 'Why are you going there?' (within the sight of the speaker)
- Aram kin tua. 'Let's go there.' (referring to location far away from speaker)

==== Locatives ====
Locative determiners
	Form	Gloss
Proximal	ditu	here
Medial	dia	there
Distal	din	there, yonder

Examples:

- Ditu ku nganti nuan. 'I wait for you here.'
- Dia ku nganti nuan. 'I wait for you there.' (not far from the speaker's location)
- Din ku nganti nuan. 'I wait for you there.' (referring to a far place)

==== Manner ====
Iban also has a set of adverbs referring to manner. They are a combination of baka (ke) ('like/as') and the abbreviated determiner forms tu, nya and nyin.

Locative determiners
	Form	Gloss
Proximal	baka tu	like this, this way
Medial	baka nya	like that, that way
Distal	baka nyin	like that, that way

Examples:

- Aku ka iya baka tu. 'I want it to be like this.'
- Nama di ngaga iya baka nya? 'Why did you treat him like this?'
- Uji gaga di baka ke nyin. 'Try to do it like that.'

=== Interrogative words ===
Iban also has a few interrogative words: sapa, nama, ni, lapa, kemaya and berapa.

- Sapa – Who

Sapa empu jam tu?
Who own watch this
Who owns this watch?

- Nama – What

Nama gaga nuan ditu?
What doing you here
What are you doing here?

- Ni – Where (Dini and Ba ni also used to ask for specific location)

Ni ai ku tadi?
Where water/drink my {just now}
Where is my drink?

- Lapa – Why (Nama kebuah also used.)

Lapa nuan nyabak?
Why you crying
Why are you crying?

- Kemaya – When

Kemaya tua deka betemu?
When we {going to} meet
When are we going to meet?

- Berapa – How many

Berapa iku manuk tupi nuan?
{How many} CL chicken raise you
How many chicken you raise?

- Bakani – How

Bakani gaya {mua ari} saritu?
How look weather today
How is the weather today?

== Vocabulary ==
The first Iban-English Dictionary was published in 1900 by Rev. William Howell, an Anglican priest based at Sabu, near Simanggang (Sri Aman) and D.J.S. Bailey, a Brooke administrative officer as A Sea Dyak Dictionary.

A Comprehensive Iban-English Dictionary, jointly published by The Dayak Cultural Foundation and The Tun Jugah Foundation in 2016, contains 31,000 entries and about 1900 pages.

The Iban-Malay dictionary was first published by Dewan Bahasa dan Pustaka (DBP), in 1989. The second edition was published in 2015. It contains 11,530 entries dan 9,710 subentries.

== Writing system ==
According to Iban legend, an ancestor named Renggi devised a writing script on the skin of wood, but it was soaked in water and the writing vanished. Anguished with the tragedy, Renggi munched the script and swallowed it where the script became ingrained in Renggi's brain and blood and also his descendants. Since then, the Ibans became adept at memorising oral traditions, just like exactly written in books. Occasionally, the Ibans used personalised symbols as memory aids on their writing boards (papan turai). Papan turai was used to record ritual poems such as pengap and sabak.

As the Iban language had no extant writing system of its own, Christian missionaries adopted the Latin alphabet in an attempt to codify the language. A Sea Dyak Dictionary, published in 1900, was important in the early development of the Iban as a written language. During the Crown Colony era, the Borneo Literature Bureau also worked on the written form of the Iban language.

From 1947 to 1962, Dunging anak Gunggu invented an Iban syllabary known as the Dunging script. In 2010, Dr. Bromeley Philip of Universiti Teknologi MARA, who is also a grandnephew to Dunging, created digital fonts for Dunging script, named "LaserIban", available for Windows and Macintosh computers. Bromeley also launched a course to promote the use of LaserIban and had transcribed several traditional folktales from Latin alphabet into Dunging script. However, the Dunging script is not widely adopted. As of 2011, only three people in the world mastered the Dunging script, namely Bromeley himself, longhouse chief Tuai Rumah Bagat Nunui and teacher Ngambong Katoi.

== Dialects ==
Iban can be subdivided into different sub-ethnic groups, each of which speak in different dialects. The most formal, intermediate, and working dialect is the Saribas dialect, and mainly Betong and Saratok. Others such as Balau, Sebuyau, Ulu Ai, and Rejang are mutually intelligible throughout the Sarawak region. The exception is the Iban Remun/Milikin dialect, which is still understood by Ibans from other districts. In West Kalimantan, dialects such as Bugau, Seberuang, Mualang, Chengkang, Sebaru, and Dau are more disparate.

=== Dialect comparison ===
Comparison between Balau-Saribas and Mualang dialect
English	Balau-Saribas (Sarawak)	Mualang (Kalimantan)
Rooster	Manuk	Renyau
Smell	Nyium	Lulum
Stupid	Tuyu, banga	Mawa
Twins	sapit	Rakup
Window	Penyinga/jenila	Telingu'
Father	Apai	Mpai
Feel	Asai	Asa'
And	Enggau	Aba'
Animal	Jelu	Ibun
Arrange	Tusun	Tunsun, tipan
Breathe	Seput	Penyuan

Sample text (Luke 2:10-11)

Mualang (West Kalimantan, Indonesia)

10 Baroꞌ mlikat Tuhan Allah madah ke sidaꞌ: “Nang kitaꞌ takot! Ku madah brita bayek ari Tuhan Allah ke kitaꞌ, te nyuroh gaga ugaꞌ bansa.
11 Malam toꞌ de kuta Daod^{e} udah adai Penyelamat kitaꞌ, Al Maseh Raja te dedanyi Tuhan Allah, nyaꞌ mah Tuhan.

Iban (Sarawak, Malaysia)

10 Tang ku melikat nya bejaku ngagai sida, “Anang takut! Laban aku mai ngagai kita Berita Manah ti ngasuh ati semua mensia gaga:
11 sehari tu, di nengeri David, Juruselamat kita udah ada, iya nya Kristus ti Tuhan!

Sebuyau (Sarawak, Malaysia)

10 Tapi kenu mlikat nia bepadah ka hida-eh, “Nang kita takut! Tegal aku minching ka kita Behita Badas te mela ati semua mensia hindang:
11 chahi tia, de nenggehi David, Penyelamat kita udah ada, iya nia Kehistus te Petaha!

Comparison between Balau-Saribas and Remun
English	Balau-Saribas	Remun/Milikin
No	Enda	Entai
See	Meda	Ngilau
Know	Nemu	Badak
Shirt	Gari	Kelatang
Run	Belanda	Belawa
Silence!	Anang inggar	Sengian
Stupid	Beli'/Palui/bangka	Labuan
No/Did not	Nadai	Entai
Tomorrow	Pagila	Pagi
Later	Lagi/legi	Ila
Mat	Tikai	Kelaya
Good	Manah	Nyelaie

Sample phases in Iban Remun

- Entai ku ngilau – Nadai aku meda. ('I did not see it.')
- Entauk ku badak – Enda ku nemu. ('I don't know.')

Comparison between Standard Iban and Sebuyau
English	Standard Iban	Sebuyau/Kua'
You	Nuan	Kua'
Why	Lapa	Mentang
Stupid	Tuyu, beli	Banga
No	Enda	Adai
Later	Lagi	Ila
Tomorrow	Pagila	Pagi
Know	Nemu	Siba
To hurry	Beguai/Berumban	Temengat
Side dishes	Engkayu	Hempah
Come out	Pansut	Temenyul
Restless	Kekasak	Kekajal
Untidy	Temerak	Kemada
Like this	Baka nya	Baka nia
Causes	Ngasuh	Mela
Shocked	Tekenyit	Tekanyat
Slow	Lubah	Lumbu

== Examples ==
=== Numbers ===
English	Iban	Iban Standard
One	San	Sa/satu
Two	Duan	Dua
Three	Dangku	Tiga
Four	Dangkan	Empat
Five	Dana/Tebak	Lima
Six	Dia/Tunggul	Nam
Seven	Tuchung/Kusil	Tujuh
Eight	Dalun/Kulat	Lapan
Nine	Dunggau/Kedu	Semilan
Ten	Dupuk/Kedat	Sepuluh

=== Family ===
English	Iban
Father	Apai/Aba
Mother	Indai/Ina
Grandfather	Aki
Grandmother	Ini
Uncle	Aya
Aunt	Ibu
Siblings	Menyadi/Madi
Elder brother/Elder sister	Aka/Ika/Menyadi tuai
Younger brother/sister	Adi/Menyadi biak
Grandchildren	Uchu
Great-grandchildren	Ichit

For extended family in Iban

English	Iban
Parent-in-law	Entua
Father-in-law	Entua ke laki
Mother-in-law	Entua ke indu
Stepfather or stepmother	Apai/Indai tiri
Siblings-in-law	Menyadi/Madi ipar
Brother-in-law	Ipar ke laki
Sister-in-law	Ipar ke indu
Great-grandfather	Aki ichit
Great-grandmother	Ini ichit
Nibling	Anak buah
Nephew	Anak buah ke laki
Niece	Anak buah ke indu
Cousin	Petunggal
One's parent to parents-in-law	Isan

Example;

- Anak buah bini ku nya. 'That is my wife's nibling.'
- Anak buah ke indu laki ku nya. 'That is my husband's niece.'
- Entua laki ku nya. 'That is my husband's parent-in-law.'
- Entua ke laki laki ku nya. 'That is my husband's father-in-law.'
- Petunggal bini ku nya. 'That is my wife's cousin.'

=== Days ===
English/Roman	Iban
Day before yesterday	Ensanus/Ensana
Yesterday	Kemari
Today	Saritu
Tomorrow	Pagila
Day after tomorrow	Lusa
3 days later	Tulat
The fourth day	Lupat

Example:

- Tulat tua betemu. 'We'll meet again the third day.'
- Ensanus ku bisi meda iya 'I saw him two days ago.'

=== Months ===
The Iban calendar is one month ahead of the Gregorian calendar as follows:

English/Gregorian	Iban
January	Empalai rubai
February	Emperega/Empekap
March	Lelang
April	Turun panggul
May	Sandih tundan
June	Tujuh
July	Berenggang reban
August	Kelebun
September	Labuh benih
October	Gantung senduk
November	Chechanguk
December	Pangka di labu (first month of Iban calendar)

=== Sample phrases ===
Iban	English/Roman
Nama berita nuan?	How are you?
Sapa nama nuan?	What is your name?
Berapa/mesa rega utai tu?	How much is this?
Dini alai ___?	Where is ___?
Ari ni penatai nuan?	Where are you from?
Datai ari ___aku	I come from ___
Pukul berapa diatu?	What is the time now?
Selamat lemai!	Good evening!
Selamat ngalih ari!	Good afternoon!
Lalu nemuai!	Welcome!
Anang manchal!	Don't be naughty!
Enda ulih datai	Couldn't make it
Anang guai	Hold on/Wait a second
Nadai ngawa nya/enda ngawa	Nevermind/it does not matter
Ka belaya	Do you want to fight?
Pulai/mupuk dulu	Going back
Aram bekelala tua	Let's get to know each other
Pengerindu	Love, passion
Aku lelengauka nuan	I miss you/I am missing you
Sapa enggau nuan?	Who came/is with you?
Aku enggau ___	I came / went with ___; I am with ___
Alau dinga	Please listen (Saratok dialect)
Anang inggar / ragak	Silent, please
Kini ke nuan?	Where are you going?
Mar amat!	Too expensive/difficult
Tusah endar!	Too difficult
Kapa nya!	Couldn't care less/what is that for!
Selamat pagi, Pengajar	Good morning, teacher
Enda nemu aku tu	I don't know
Aram ngirup mih kitai	Let's we drink
Ka ke pasar ku pagila	I want to go to the town tomorrow
Mupuk gawa aku	I'm going to work
Ka tinduk aku	I want to go to sleep/bed
Sapa kita ke manchal?	Who is being naughty?
Bajik amat nuan	You are pretty/beautiful (for women)
Sigat amat nuan	You are handsome (for men)
Aku meruan sayauka nuan belama	I will always love you
Asai ke kala meda nuan	I feel like I have seen you before

== Bible translation and Sample Text ==
=== Genesis 1:1–3 ===
Ba pun iya kelia, lebuh Allah Taala berengkah ngaga langit enggau dunya, dunya endang apin bisi bakal tauka gamal sereta nadai utai nguan. Semina ribut ti deras ari Allah Taala aja ti bepuput atas tasik ti agi petang. Allah Taala lalu bejaku, “Awakka penampak pegari.” Penampak lalu pegari. Allah Taala meda penampak nya manah; lalu Iya nyeraraka penampak nya ari pemetang. Iya ngumbai penampak nya “Siang” lalu pemetang nya dikumbai Iya “Malam.” Lemai ambis lalu pagi pan datai. Nya hari ti keterubah.

Translation:

In the beginning God created heaven and earth. The earth was formless and empty, and darkness covered the deep water. The spirit of God was hovering over the water. Then God said, "Let there be light!" So there was light. God saw the light was good. So God separated the light from the darkness. God named the light "day", and the darkness he named "night". There was evening, then morning, the first day.

=== Human Rights ===
English: Article 1 – All human beings are born free and equal in rights. They are endowed with reason and conscience and should act towards one another in a spirit of brotherhood.

Malay: Perkara 1 – Semua manusia dilahirkan bebas dan sama dalam hak. Mereka dikurniakan akal dan hati nurani dan harus bertindak antara satu sama lain dalam semangat persaudaraan.

Standard Iban: Pekara 1 : Semua mensia ada meratai enggau hak ke sebaka. Sida diberi penau runding enggau ati tuchi lalu enda tau enda begulai enggau pangan diri dalam serakup entara bala menyadi.

Balau Iban Dialect: Pekaha 1 : Semua mensia ada bebas enggau hak ti sebaka. Sida dibehi penau runding enggau ati behesi alu enda tau enda begulai enggau dihi sama dihi dalam gehempung entaha bala menyadi.

Other Iban Dialect: Pekaro 1 : Semuo mensio ado bebas enggau hak ti sebako. Sida diberi penau runding enggau ati tuchi lalu enda tau enda begulai enggau diri samo diri dalam serakup entaro balo menyadi.

Pikaro 1 : Simuo minsio ado bibas nggau hak ti sibako. Sida dibiri penau runding enggau ati tuchi lalu endo tau endo bigulai enggau diri samo diri dalam sirakup intaro balo minyadi.

== Sources ==
- Richards, Anthony (1981). An Iban-English Dictionary. New York: Oxford University Press. [Paperback reprint in the 1988 by Penerbit Fajar Bakti, Petaling Jaya. ISBN 967653384X]
- Asmah Haji Omar (1969). The Iban Language of Sarawak: A Grammatical Description (PhD thesis). SOAS University of London.
- Asmah Haji Omar (1981). The Iban Language of Sarawak: A Grammatical Description. Kuala Lumpur: Kementarian Pelajaran Malaysia.
- Steinmayer, Otto (1999). Jalai Jako' Iban: A Basic Grammar of the Iban Language of Sarawak. Kuching: Klasik Publishing House.
- Renang Anak Ansali (2002), "Jaku Iban serta basa kitai", University of London Magazine
