= Hikayat Aceh =

- National Library of Indonesia, Leiden University Library
- Manuscripts of the Hikayat Aceh in the Leiden University Library.
- Also known as: Hikayat Aceh (named by H.H. Juynboll); Tarikh As-Shalihin wa Sabil as-Sa’irin (named by Shamsuddin as-Sumaṭrānī); Hikayat Iskandar Muda
- Date: Unknown; between 17th century (1606-1636)
- Place of origin: Aceh Sultanate
- Language: Malay (Jawi script)
- Author: Unknown; suggested (amongst others): Sulṭāna Taj ul-Alam Safiatuddin Shamsuddin ibn ʿAbdullāh as-Sumaṭrānī
- Size: ≈ 19.5 cm × 15.5 cm (7.7 in × 6.1 in) Ms. A (Cod. Or. 1954); 21 cm × 16.5 cm (8.3 in × 6.5 in) Ms. B (Cod. Or. 1983); 21.5 cm × 35 cm (8.5 in × 13.8 in) Ms. C (Katalog ID: 219142)
- Condition: Good, still readable; 281 pages found in Leiden University Library collection: Ms. A (Cod. Or. 1954); Good, still readable; 227 pages found in Leiden University Library collection: Ms. B (Cod. Or. 1983); Good, still readable; 92 pages found in National Library of Indonesia collection: Ms. C (Katalog ID: 219142)
- Script: Arabic script, Jawi script
- Contents: Hikayat, adventures, stories
- Exemplar(s): Three copies of the manuscript (kept in Leiden (2) and Jakarta (1): 1. Ms. A (Cod. Or. 1954) in Leiden; 2. Ms. B (Cod. Or. 1983) in Leiden; 3. Ms. C (Katalog ID: 219142) in Jakarta
- Previously kept: Taj ul-Alam Safiatuddin, Aceh Sultanate; Shamsuddin as-Sumaṭrānī (copies); Isaak de Saint Martin Library; AD Cornets de Groot (1804-1829); Rijks-Instelling tot Opleiding van Indische Ambtenaren (RIOIA)
- Accession: Ms. A (Cod. Or. 1954), Ms. B (Cod. Or. 1983); Ms. C (Katalog ID: 219142)

The Hikayat Aceh is a 17th-century history of the Aceh Sultanate, which is located on the northern tip of the island of Sumatra, Indonesia. Written in Malay (using the Arabic script) sometime after 1607 and before the end of the 17th century, it chronicles and eulogizes the Acehnese Sultan Iskandar Muda (1583–1636; reigned 1607–1636; national hero of Indonesia since 1993). The Hikayat Aceh is an indispensable tool for all interested in the history of Aceh and its exceptional political, cultural, and religious traits.

The narrative of Sultan Iskandar Muda is told against the global background of Chinese, Portuguese, and Ottoman-Turkish influences and relations in the world. It is set in a context where also Southeast Asian regions like Siam, Cambodia, and Johor play a role.

It is also though by Russian linguist, Vladimir Braginskiĭ, That the Hikayat Aceh were influenced by Mughal dynasty historiography, as he found out the literal structure similarities of Hikayat Aceh with Mahfuzat-i-Timuri, as the former has shared the similar theme with the latter about the lifetime and exploits of the protagonist of Mahfuzat-i-Timuri, Timur. Braginskiĭ also found the similarities in structure of both Hikayat Aceh and Mahfuzat-i-Timuri with Akbarnama manuscript.

== Manuscripts ==
Only three manuscripts are still in existence. Two are kept in Leiden University Libraries (Dutch: Universitaire Bibliotheken Leiden), Leiden, the Netherlands, and one in the National Library of Indonesia (Indonesian: Perpustakaan Nasional Republik Indonesia, Perpusnas), Jakarta, Indonesia.

On 18 May 2023 these three manuscripts were inscribed in the UNESCO Memory of the World Register affirming their world significance and outstanding universal value.

=== MS. Or. 1954 ===
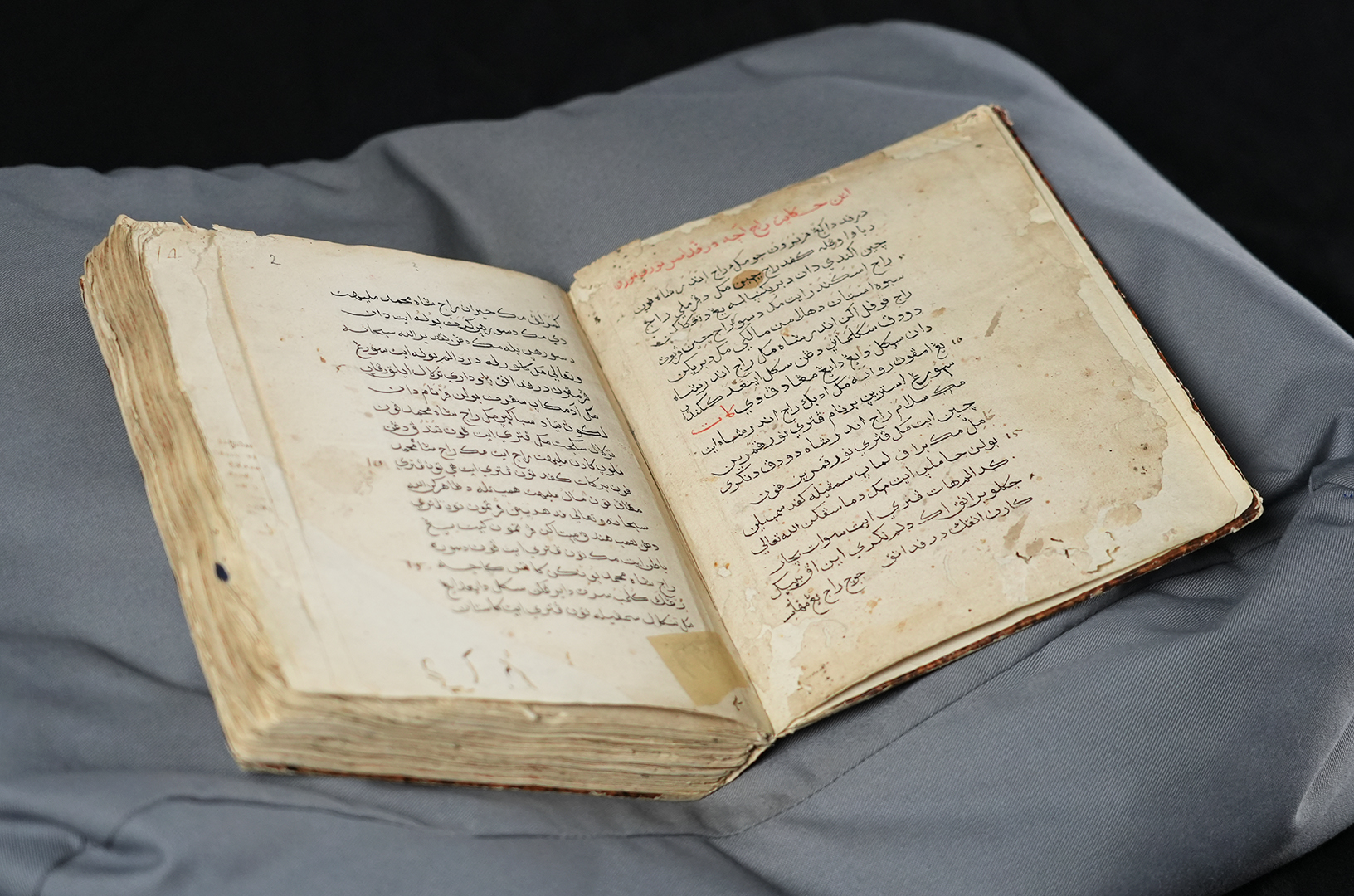
Hikayat Aceh, MS. Or. 1954, Leiden University Libraries

As the oldest (c.1675-1700) and most complete text, this is the central manuscript of the Hikayat Aceh and the one edited as manuscript A by Teuku Iskandar (1958). The manuscript is kept in Leiden University Libraries and has been digitized.

=== MS. Or. 1983 ===
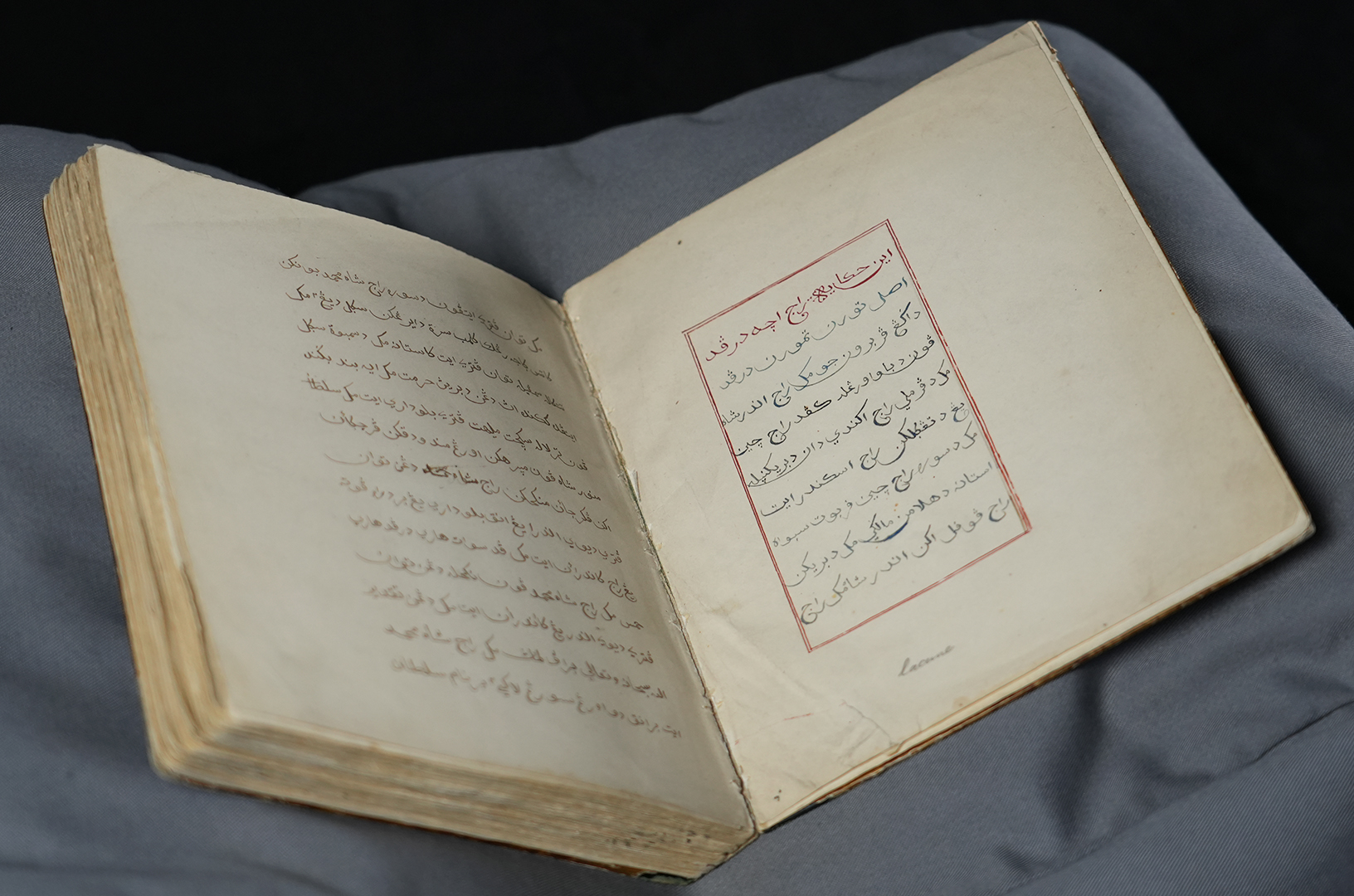
Hikayat Aceh, MS. Or. 1983, Leiden University Libraries

This is a copy of Or. 1954 in Batavian Malay dated 9 March 1847 and used as manuscript B in Teuku Iskandar (1958). The manuscript is kept in Leiden University Libraries and has been digitized.

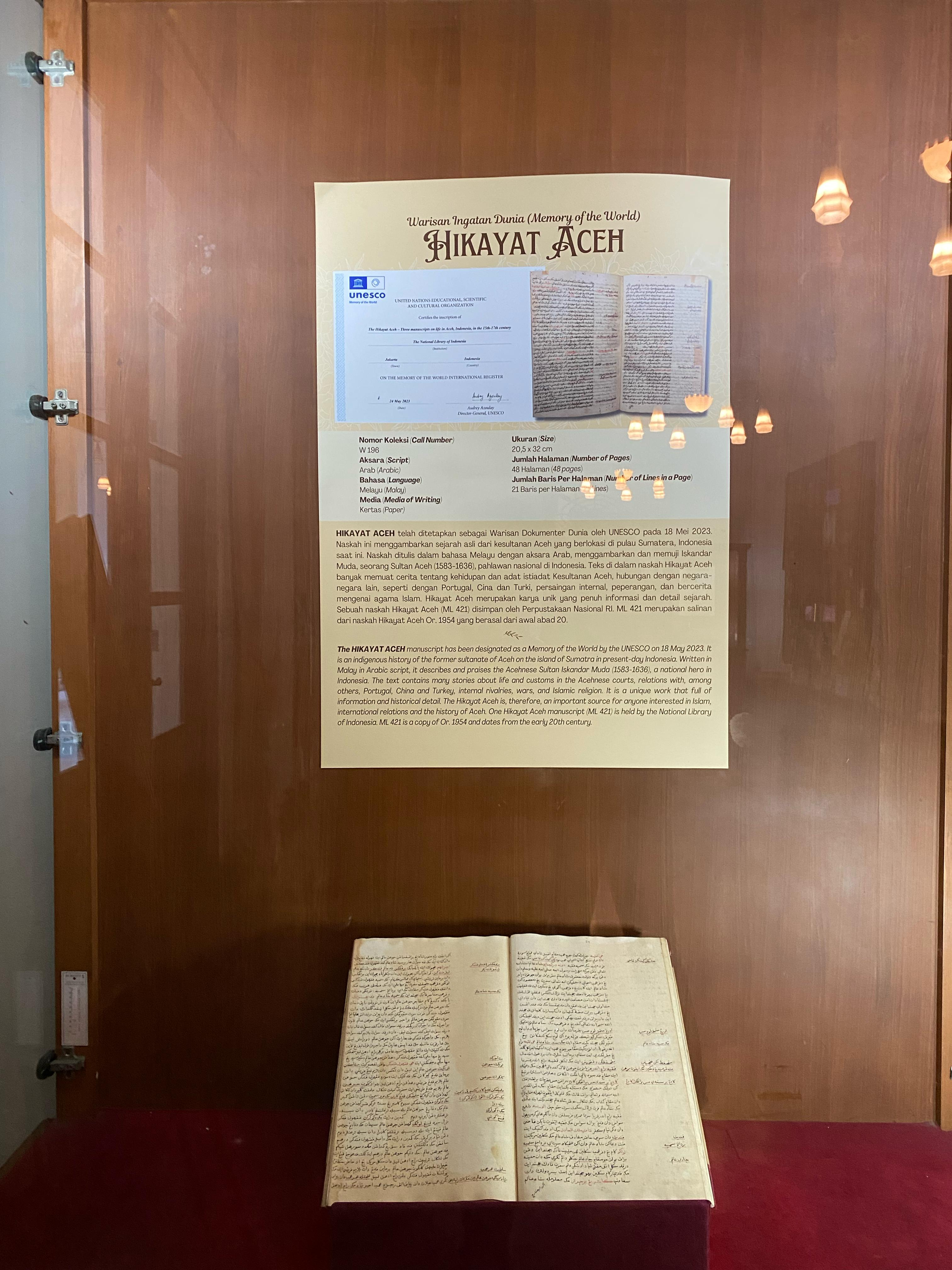
Hikayat Aceh at the National Library of Indonesia.

=== MS. ML 421 ===
This is another copy of Or. 1954, dating from the early 20th century, and probably intended as the basis for a text edition of the Hikayat Aceh by Hoesein Djajadiningrat. The manuscript is kept in the National Library of Indonesia.
