= Jawi script =

Arabic alphabet used in Southeast Asia

Jawi جاوي
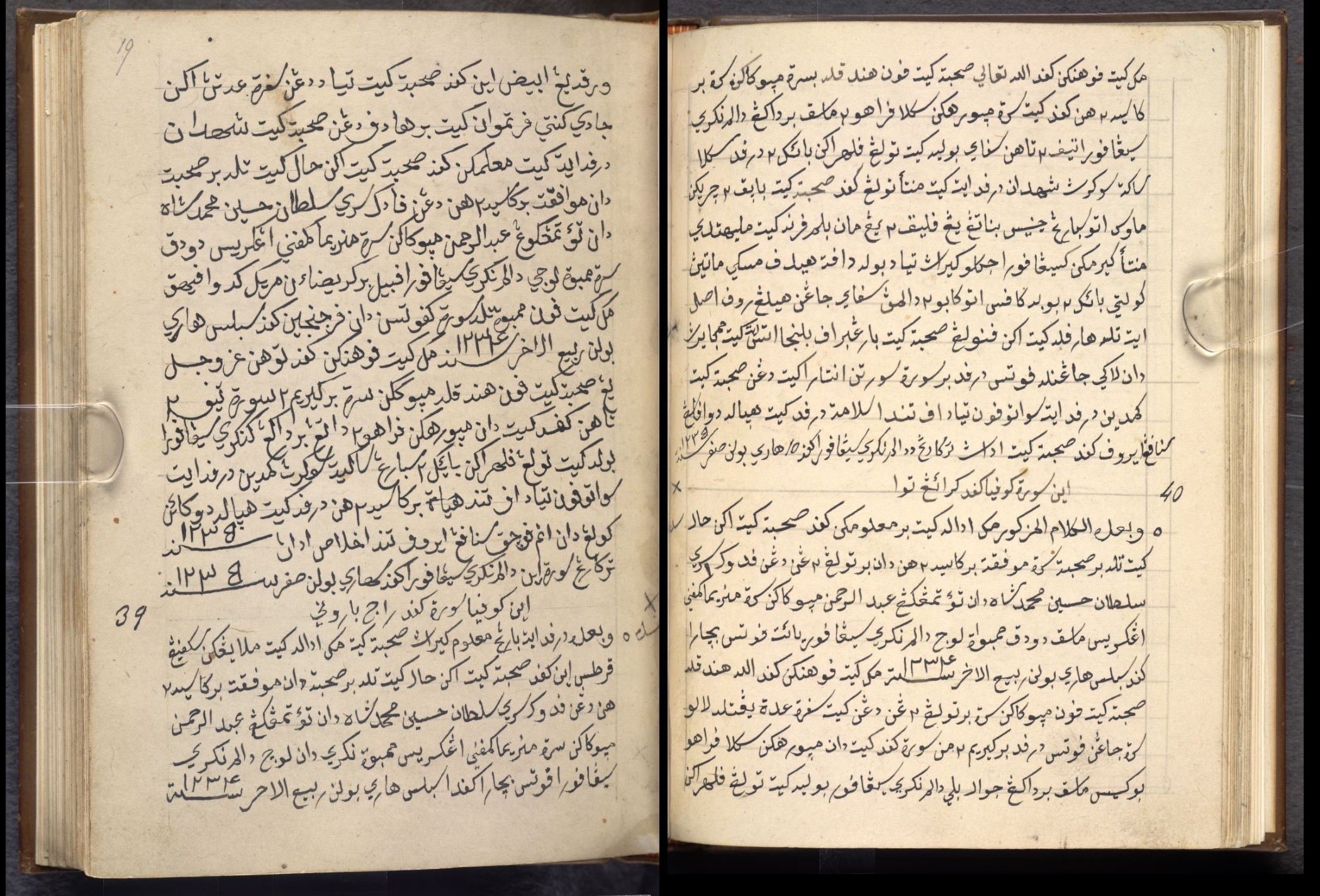
- Letter from William Farquhar to Sultan Muhammad Kanzul Alam, the sultan of Brunei, dated 28 November 1819
- Script type: Abjad
- Period: c. 9th century to the present (limited use in cultural & religious affairs only)
- Direction: Right-to-left
- Official script: Co-official: Brunei; Malaysia; Regional: Indonesia; Philippines (Bangsamoro); Thailand; Cambodia
- Languages: Acehnese (Jawoe); Banjarese; Betawi; Iranun; Kutainese; Maguindanao; Mëranaw; Malay; Minangkabau; Tausūg; Ternate; Champa (Cham Jawi); several other languages in Southeast Asia

Related scripts
- Parent systems: Proto-Sinaitic: Phoenician; Aramaic; Nabataean; Arabic; Persian; Jawi
- Sister systems: Pegon script

Jawi (جاوي; Acehnese: Jawoe; Acehnese pronunciation: [ɟa.ˈwɔə̯]; Malay: Jawi; Malay pronunciation: [d͡ʒä.wi]) is a writing system used for writing several languages of Southeast Asia, such as Acehnese, Banjarese, Betawi, Iranun, Kutainese, Maguindanao, Malay, Mëranaw, Minangkabau, Tausūg, Ternate, and many others. Jawi is based on the Arabic script, consisting of all 31 original Arabic letters, six letters constructed to fit phonemes native to Malay, and one additional phoneme used in foreign loanwords, but not found in Classical Arabic, which are ca (⟨چ⟩ /t͡ʃ/), nga (⟨ڠ⟩ /ŋ/), pa (⟨ڤ⟩ /p/), ga (⟨ݢ⟩ /ɡ/), va (⟨ۏ⟩ /v/), and nya (⟨ڽ⟩ /ɲ/).

Jawi was developed during the advent of Islam in Maritime Southeast Asia, supplanting the earlier Brahmic scripts used during Hindu-Buddhist era. The oldest evidence of Jawi writing can be found on the 14th century Terengganu Inscription Stone, a text in Classical Malay that contains a mixture of Malay, Sanskrit and Arabic vocabularies. However, the script may have been used as early as the 9th century, when the Peureulak Sultanate was established by the son of a Persian preacher. There are two competing theories on the origins of the Jawi alphabet. Popular theory suggests that the system was developed and derived directly from the Arabic script, while scholars like R. O. Windstedt suggest it was developed with the influence of the Perso-Arabic alphabet.

The ensuing trade expansions and the spread of Islam to other areas of Southeast Asia from the 15th century carried the Jawi alphabet beyond the traditional Malay-speaking world. Until the 20th century, Jawi was the standard script of the Malay language, and gave birth to traditional Malay literature when it featured prominently in official correspondences, religious texts, and literary publications. With the arrival of Western influence through colonization and education, Jawi was relegated to religious education, with the Malay language eventually adopting a form of the Latin alphabet called Rumi that is currently in general usage.

Today, Jawi is one of two official scripts in Brunei. In Malaysia, the position of Jawi is protected under Section 9 of the National Language Act 1963/67, as it retains a degree of official use in religious and cultural contexts. In some states, most notably Kelantan, Terengganu, and Pahang, Jawi has co-official script status as businesses are mandated to adopt Jawi signage and billboards. Jawi is also used as an alternative script among Malay communities in Indonesia and Thailand.

Until the early 20th century, there was no standard spelling system for Jawi. The earliest orthographic reform towards a standard system was in 1937 by The Malay Language and Johor Royal Literary Book Pact. This was followed by another reform by Za'aba, published in 1949. The final major reform was the Enhanced Guidelines of Jawi Spelling issued in 1986, which was based on the Za'aba system. Jawi can be typed using the Jawi keyboard.

== Etymology ==
The word Jawi (جاوي) is a shortening of the term in Arabic: الجزائر الجاوي, romanized: Al-Jaza'ir Al-Jawi, lit. 'Java Archipelago', which is the term used by Arabs for Nusantara. The word jawi is a loanword from Javanese: ꦗꦮꦶ, romanized: jawi which is Javanese Krama word to refer to the Java Island or Javanese people.

According to Kamus Dewan, Jawi (جاوي) is a term synonymous to 'Malay'. The term has been used interchangeably with 'Malay' in other terms including Bahasa Jawi or Bahasa Yawi (Kelantan-Pattani Malay, a Malayan language used in Southern Thailand), Masuk Jawi (literally "to become Malay", referring to the practice of circumcision to symbolise the coming of age), and Jawi pekan or Jawi Peranakan (literally 'Malay of the town' or 'Malay born of', referring to the Malay-speaking Muslims of mixed Malay and Indian ancestry). With verb-building circumfixes men-...-kan, menjawikan (literally 'to make something Malay'), also refers to the act of translating a foreign text into Malay language. The phrase Tulisan Jawi that means 'Jawi script' is another derivative that carries the meaning 'Malay script'.

Syed Muhammad Naquib stated that the term Jawi among Arabs is used to refer to residents of Java, and Java in this context refers to all residents from the Malay archipelago.

== Early history ==
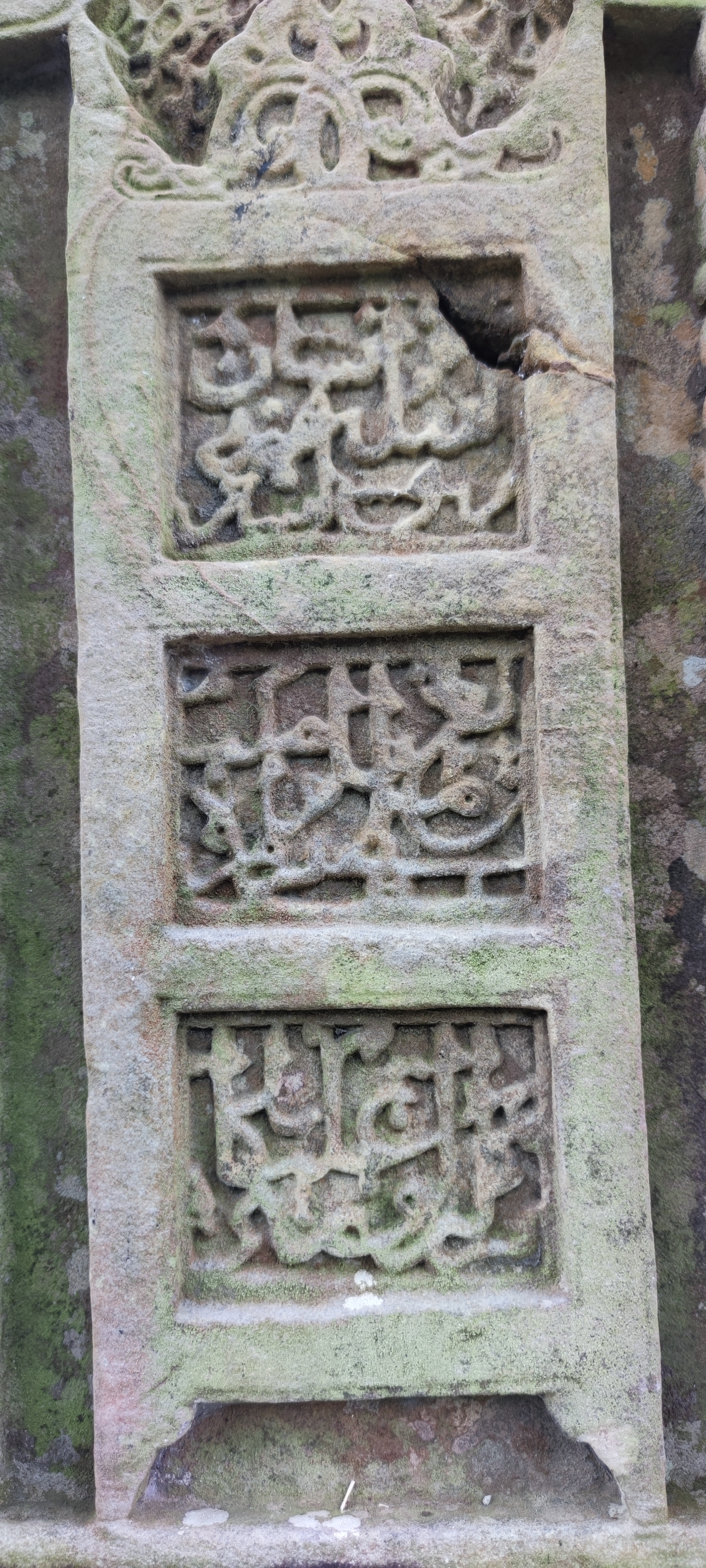
A tombstone in Aceh with Jawi inscription dated from 16th or 17th century. The inscription are: 1st row: bahwasanya inilah nisan kubur 2nd row: yang mulia bernama Meurah Meukuta 3rd row: bergelar orang kaya kapai

Prior to the onset of Islamisation, the Pallava script, Nagari, and old Sumatran scripts were used in writing the Malay language. This is evidenced from the discovery of several stone inscriptions in Old Malay, notably the Kedukan Bukit inscription and Talang Tuo inscription. The spread of Islam in Southeast Asia and the subsequent introduction of Arabic writing system began with the arrival of Muslim merchants in the region since the seventh century. Among the oldest archaeological artefacts inscribed with Arabic script are; a tombstone of Syeikh Rukunuddin dated 48 AH (668/669 CE) in Barus, Sumatra; a tombstone dated 290 AH (910 CE) on the mausoleum of Syeikh Abdul Qadir Ibn Husin Syah Alam located in Alor Setar, Kedah; a tombstone found in Pekan, Pahang dated 419 AH (1026 CE); a tombstone discovered in Phan Rang, Vietnam dated 431 AH (1039 CE); a tombstone dated 440 AH (1048 CE) found in Bandar Seri Begawan, Brunei; and a tombstone of Fatimah Binti Maimun Bin Hibat Allah found in Gresik, East Java dated 475 AH (1082 CE). Islam was spread from the coasts to the interior of the island and generally in a top-down process in which rulers were converted and then introduced more or less orthodox versions of Islam to their peoples. The conversion of King Phra Ong Mahawangsa of Kedah in 1136 and King Merah Silu of Samudra Pasai in 1267 were among the earliest examples.

At the early stage of Islamisation, the Arabic script was taught to the people who had newly embraced Islam in the form of religious practices, such as the recitation of Quran as well as salat. The Arabic script was accepted by the Malay community together with their acceptance of Islam and was adapted to suit spoken Classical Malay. Six letters were added for sounds not found in Arabic: ca, pa, ga, nga, va and nya. Some Arabic letters are rarely used as they represent sounds not present in modern Malay however may be used to reflect the original spelling of Arabic loanwords. The sounds represented by these letters may be assimilated into sounds found in Malay's native phoneme inventory or in some instances appear unchanged. Like the other Arabic scripts, some letters are obligatorily joined while some are never joined. This was the same for the acceptance of Arabic writing in Turkey, Persia and India which had taken place earlier and thus, the Jawi script was then deemed as the writing of the Muslims.

The oldest remains of Malay using the Jawi script have been found on the Terengganu Inscription Stone, dated 702 AH (1303 CE), nearly 600 years after the date of the first recorded existence of Arabic script in the region. The inscription on the stone contains a proclamation issued by the "Sri Paduka Tuan" of Terengganu, urging his subjects to "extend and uphold" Islam and providing 10 basic Sharia laws for their guidance. This has attested the strong observance of the Muslim faith in the early 14th century Terengganu specifically and the Malay world as a whole.

The development of Jawi script was different from that of Pallava writing which was exclusively restricted to the nobility and monks in monasteries. The Jawi script was embraced by the entire Muslim community regardless of class. With the increased intensity in the appreciation of Islam, scriptures originally written in Arabic were translated in Malay and written in the Jawi script. Additionally local religious scholars later began to elucidate the Islamic teachings in the forms of original writings. Moreover, there were also individuals of the community who used Jawi for the writing of literature which previously existed and spread orally. With this inclusion of written literature, Malay literature took on a more sophisticated form. This was believed to have taken place from the 15th century and lasted right up to the 19th century. Other forms of Arabic-based scripts existed in the region, notably the Pegon alphabet used for Javanese in Java and the Serang alphabet used for Buginese in South Sulawesi. Both writing systems applied extensive use of Arabic diacritics and added several letters which were formed differently from Jawi letters to suit the languages. Due to their fairly limited usage, the spelling system of both scripts did not undergo similar advanced developments and modifications as experienced by Jawi.

== The spread and extent of Jawi script ==
Part of a series on

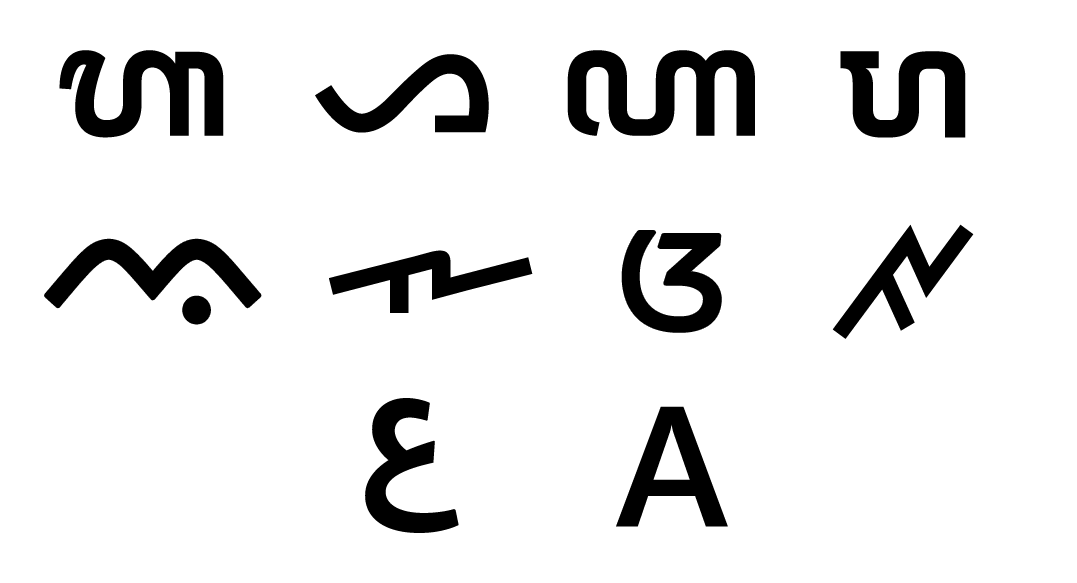

Writing systems used in Indonesia
Abugida (Brahmic)
- Balinese
- Batak
- Buda
- Javanese
- Kawi
- Lontara (Satera Jontal, Mbojo)
- Makasar
- Sasak
- Sundanese (Old Sundanese)
- Ulu (Incung, Komering, Lampung, Lembak,
- Ogan, Pasemah, Rejang, Serawai)
Abjad
- Buri Wolio
- Jawi
- Jawoe
- Pegon
Alphabet
- Latin (Van Ophuijsen, Suwandi, EYD)
Others
- Alifuru
- Bonda
- Cia-Cia
- Bilang-bilang
- Dunging
Related
- List of writing systems of Indonesia
- Languages of Indonesia

The script became prominent with the spread of Islam, supplanting the earlier writing systems. The Malays held the script in high esteem, believing it was a gateway to understanding Islam and its Holy Book, the Quran. The use of Jawi script was a key factor driving the emergence of Malay as the lingua franca of the region.

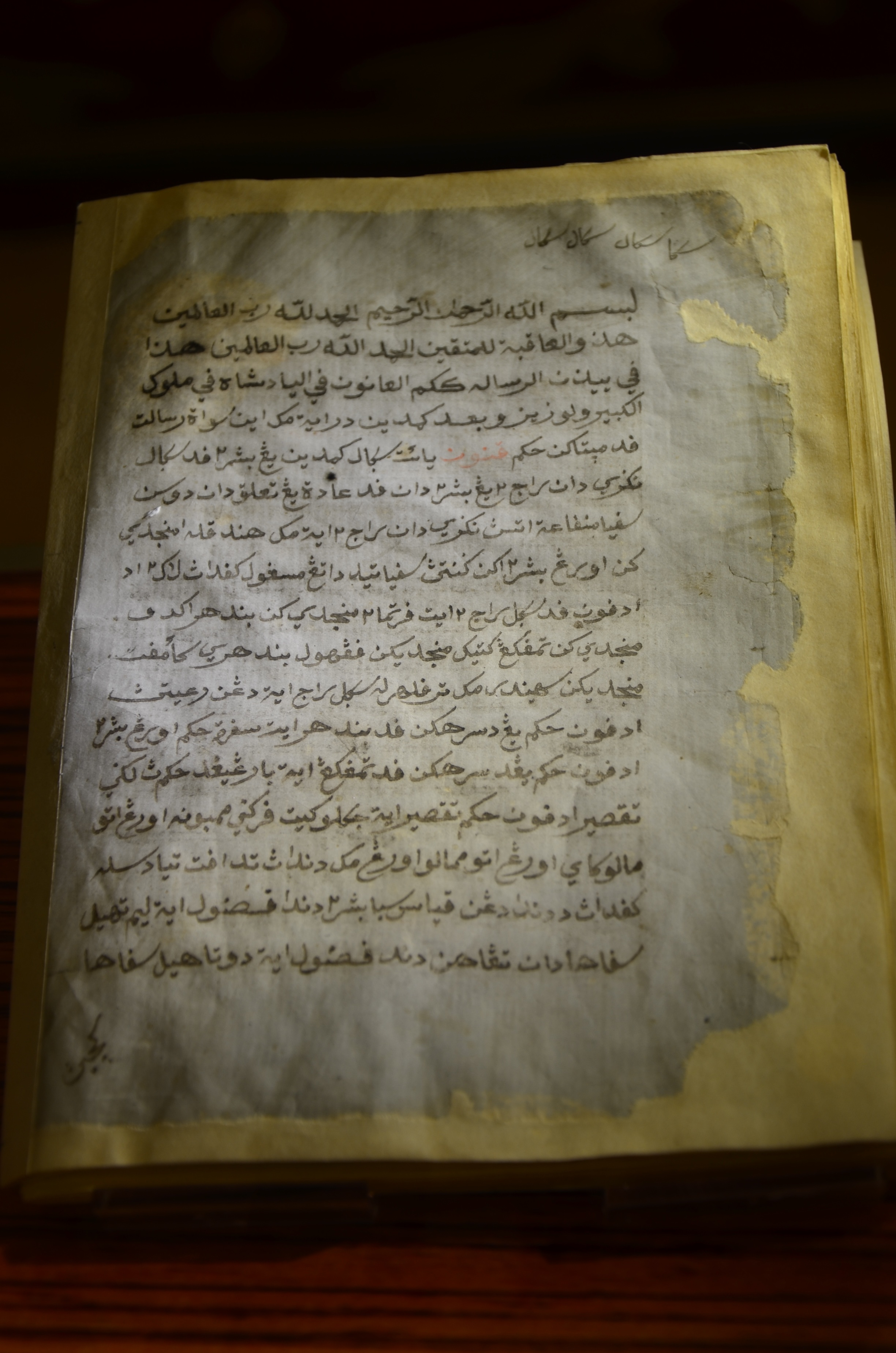
A copy of Undang-Undang Melaka ('Laws of Malacca'). The Malacca system of justice as enshrined in the text was the legal source for other major regional sultanates like Johor, Perak, Brunei, Pattani, and Aceh.

Jawi was widely used in the Sultanate of Malacca, Sultanate of Johor, Sultanate of Maguindanao, Sultanate of Brunei, Sultanate of Sulu, Sultanate of Pattani, the Sultanate of Aceh to the Sultanate of Ternate in the east as early as the 15th century. It was even used by the Muslim population in Manila Bay, under the pre-colonial state Rajahnate of Maynila rule in the 15th to 16th centuries, it was used to write Tagalog. It was used in royal correspondences, decrees, poems and was widely understood by the merchants in the port of Malacca as the main means of communication. Early legal digests such as the Undang-Undang Melaka Code and its derivatives including the Codes of Johor, Perak, Brunei, Kedah, Pattani, and Aceh were written in this script.

Jawi is a traditional symbol of Malay culture and civilisation, used not only amongst the ruling class, but also the common people. The Islamisation and Malayisation of the region popularised Jawi into a dominant script.

Examples of royal correspondences in Jawi are the letter between Sultan Hayat of Ternate and King John III of Portugal (1521), the letter from Sultan Iskandar Muda of Acèh Darussalam to King James I of England (1615), and the letter from Sultan Abdul Jalil IV of Johor to King Louis XV of France (1719). Many literary works such as epics, poetry and prose use the Jawi script. Historical epics such as the Malay Annals, as listed by UNESCO under Memories of the World, are among the countless epics written by the Malay people. The Sufic poems by Hamzah Fansuri and many others contributed to the richness and depth of the Malay civilisation.

Jawi script was the official script for the Unfederated Malay States when they were British protectorates. The growth of the printing industry in early 20th century Malaysia saw the development of a wide range of Jawi literature. The primary topics of Jawi books were religious and political. From the 1940s to the 1960s, erotica (picisan) began to be printed in Jawi, although many authors later switched to Rumi. A 1954 meeting of the Kongres Bahasa saw Rumi officially adopted as a Malay script alongside Jawi in the Federation of Malaya, and government policy over the next few decades favoured Rumi in education, resulting in Jawi literacy becoming less common. Jawi was removed from the national curriculum in the mid-1980s.

As the public educational system stopped producing Jawi texts, Jawi literature printed by private companies became dominant. Most privately produced Jawi textbooks were targeted at Islamic schools, and their contents were more conservative than in the former public school textbooks. This shift in usage led to Jawi becoming closely associated with Islam and Malay identity, with Rumi replacing its use for non-religious purposes. Over time, the use of Jawi in Malaysia became a sensitive issue. Some view attempts to promote Jawi as Islamisation or Malay chauvinism. Conversely, some view Jawi as a religious script that should not be used by non-Muslims.

== Jawi today ==
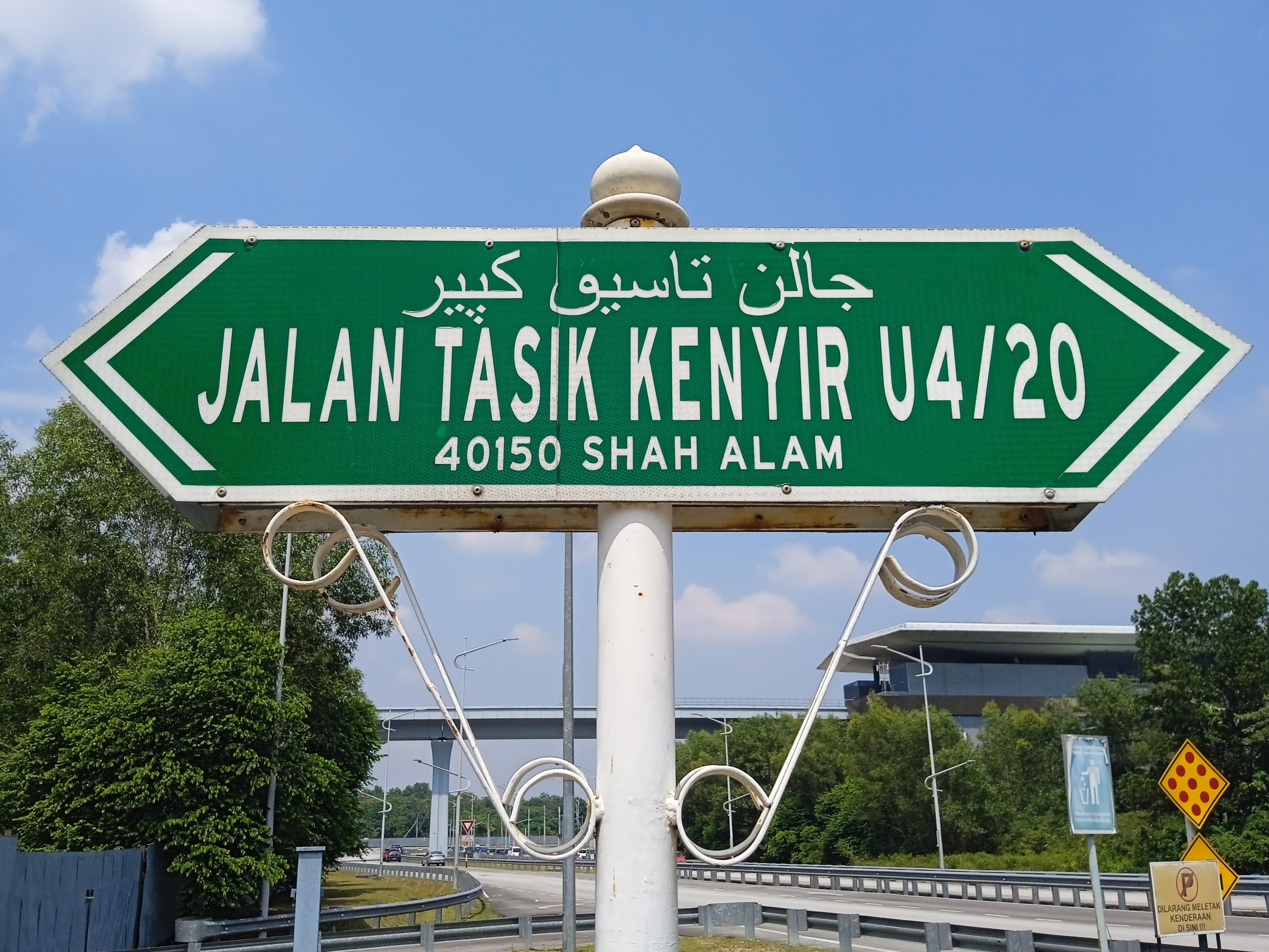
Street name signs in Shah Alam, Malaysia, include both Jawi and Latin script

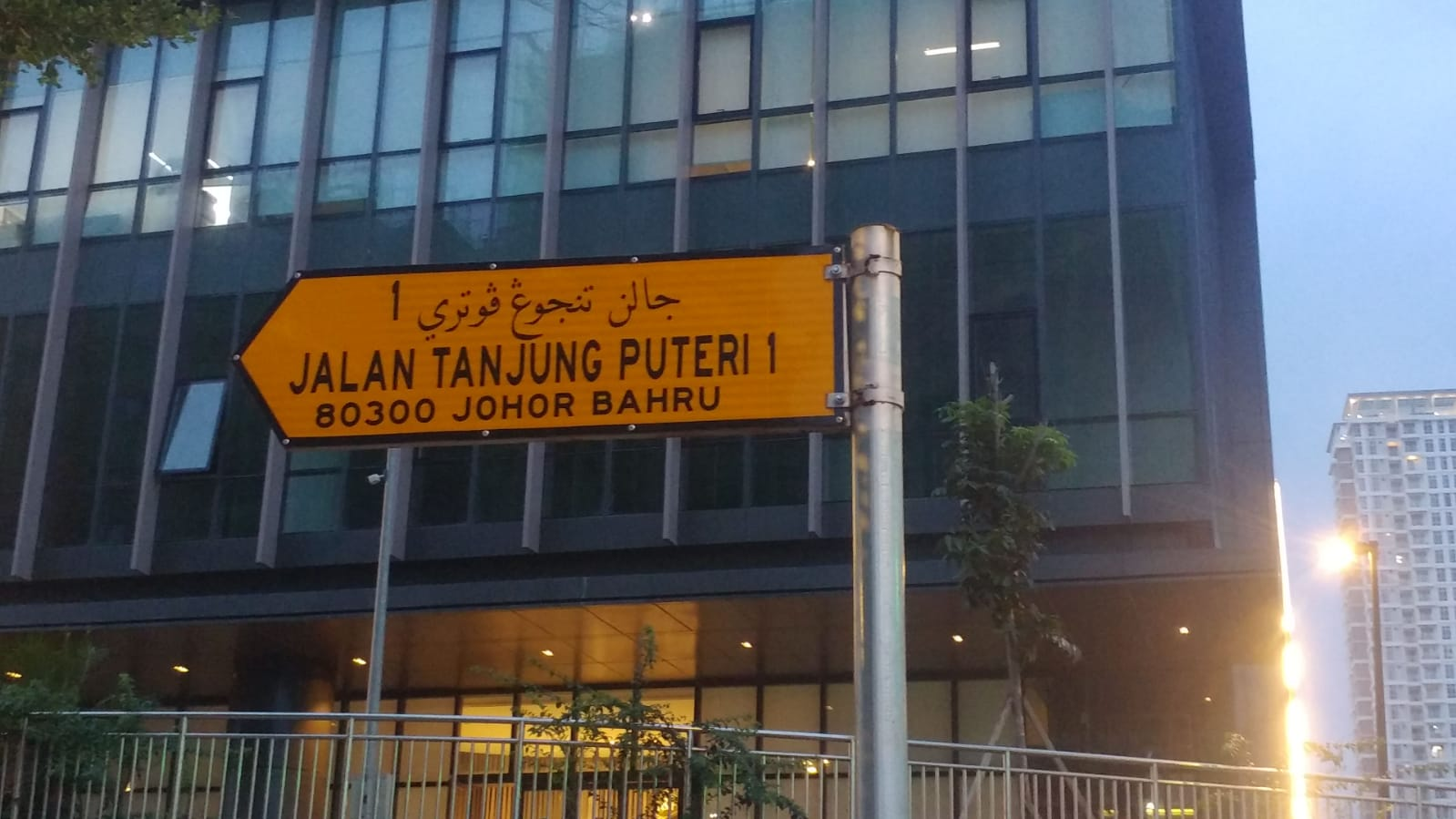
A similarly biscriptal street sign in Johor Bahru

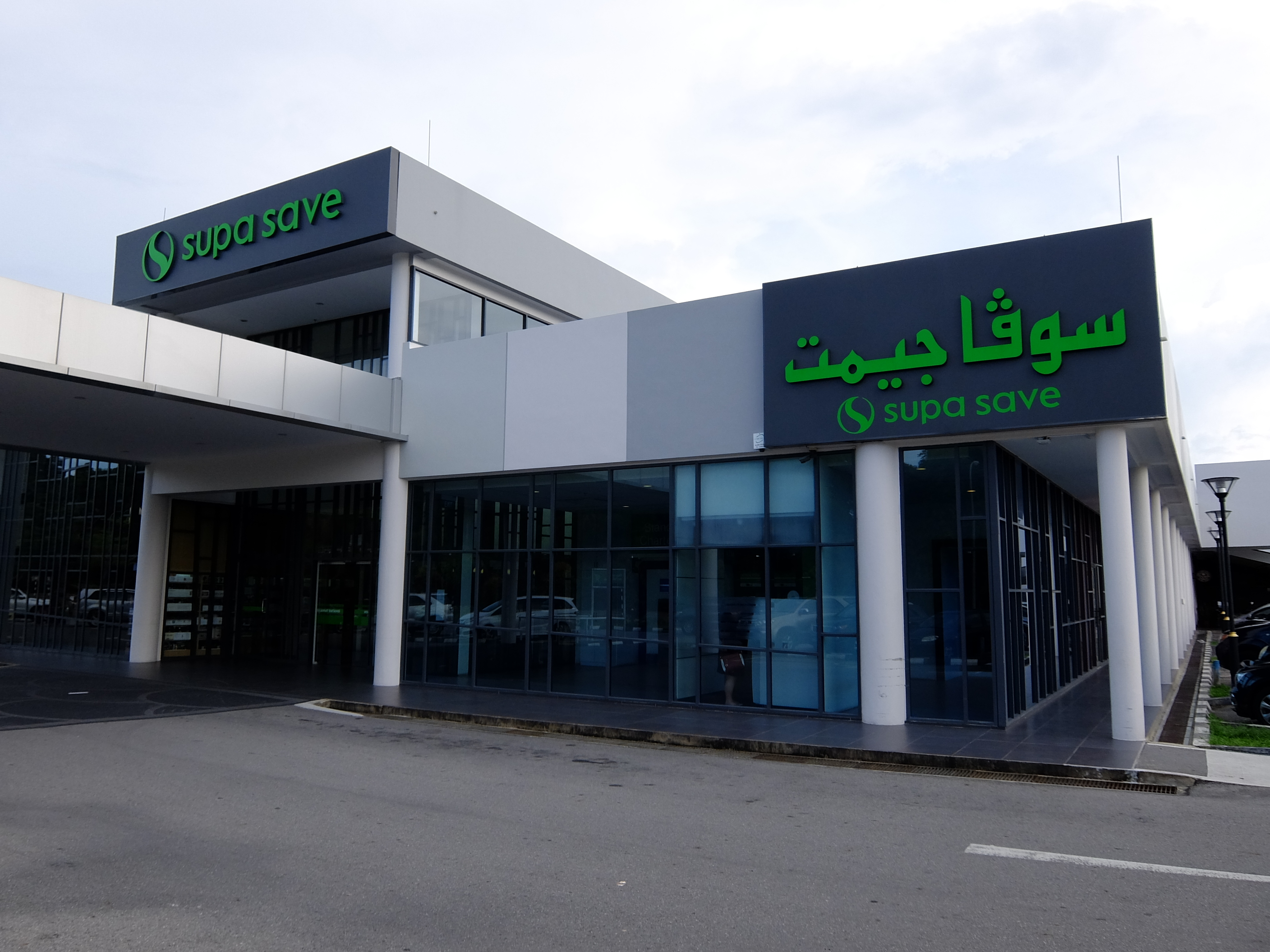
A supermarket in Brunei with Jawi and Latin script

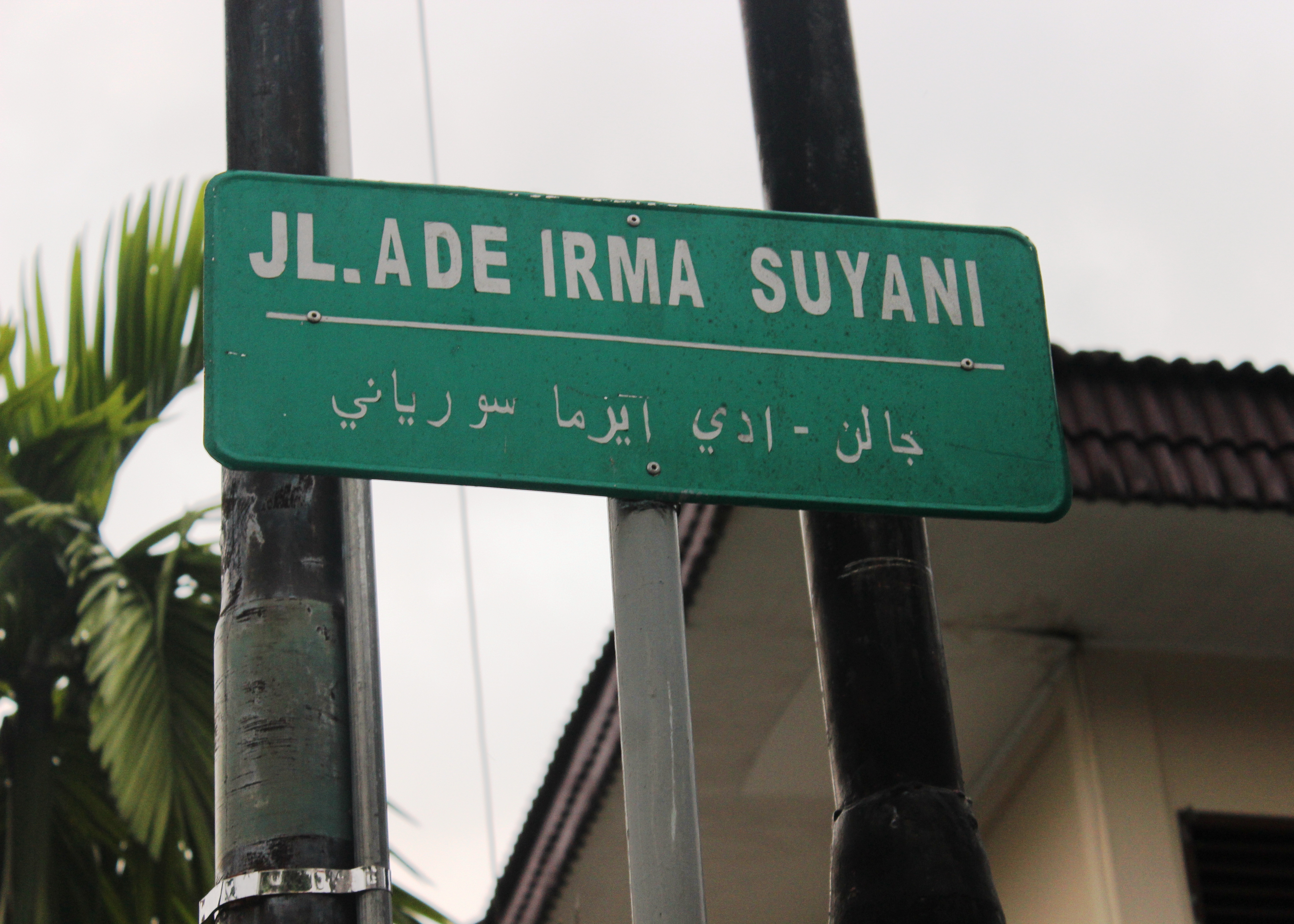
Street name signs in Pekanbaru, Riau, Indonesia, used both Jawi and Latin script.

Today, Jawi is one of the official scripts of Brunei In Malaysia, it is used for religious and cultural administration in the states of Terengganu, Kelantan, Kedah, Perlis, Penang, Pahang and Johor. Various efforts were in place to revive the Jawi script in Malaysia and Brunei due to its role in the Malay and Islamic spheres. Jawi is also seen on the reverse of Malaysian ringgit and Brunei dollar banknotes. Malays in Patani still use Jawi today for the same reasons.

Despite its decline in usage, Malay in Jawi script is available as a language option on some technology platforms and video games developed outside of Malaysia, including MediaWiki (United States), and Minecraft (Sweden).

=== In Malaysia ===
In August 2019, the Malaysian Government's plans to introduce the teaching of Jawi at the most basic level in ethnic Chinese and Tamil vernacular schools attracted opposition from ethnic Chinese and Indian education groups, which claimed that the move would lead to an Islamization of the Malaysian education system. The Chinese educationist group Dong Jiao Zong organised a conference calling on the Malaysian Government to rescind its decision in late December 2019. Perhaps fearing violence, the Royal Malaysia Police obtained a court injunction against it on the grounds it would trigger ethnic tensions.

The state government of Kedah in Malaysia has long defended the use of Jawi in the state. The Menteri Besar of Kedah has denied the allegation that the state government was trying to create an Islamic state ambience by promoting the use of Jawi in 2008, saying that it is a normal occurrence evidenced by Chinese coffeeshops and pawnshops having signboards written in Jawi. This can further be seen later on when the Kedah state government has shown its support with Johor state government's move to use Jawi in official matters in 2019. The exco of local authority of the state of Kedah had also stated that the Jawi script in billboards in Kedah is not forbidden, but rather recommended. He claims that the recommendation to use Jawi script has been gazetted in the state law, and that it has been part of the state identity to have billboards in Jawi script in addition to other scripts. He also stated that there are high demands in incorporating Jawi script in billboards in Kedah.

Kuantan, the state capital of Pahang in Malaysia has introduced the usage of Jawi on all signage across the city from 1 August 2019. This was done after a recommendation from the Yang di-Pertuan Agong, who was then the Regent of Pahang, to uphold usage of the writing system. The Pahang state government has since expanded the order and made it mandatory for every signage statewide including road signs to display Jawi alongside other scripts from 1 January 2020 after being delayed a few times. Premises that fail to comply with this order will be fined up to a maximum of RM250, with the possibility of revocation of their business licences if they still do not comply afterwards. In the early stage, usage of Jawi stickers are allowed to put on existing signage instead of replacing the whole signage.

In Johor, the test required to become a lawyer in a Syariah Court is written in Jawi. A lack of Jawi literacy is thought to be a contributing factor to a lack of Syariah lawyers in the state.

=== In Indonesia ===
Indonesia, having multiple regional and native languages, uses the Latin script for writing its own standard of Malay in general. Nonetheless, the Jawi script does have a regional status in native Malay areas such as Riau, Riau archipelago, Jambi, South Sumatra (i.e Palembang Malay language), Aceh, and Kalimantan (i.e. Banjar language). This is due to the fact that regional and native languages are compulsory studies in the basic education curriculum of each region (examples include Javanese for Javanese regions, Sundanese for Sundanese regions, Madurese for Maduranese regions, and Jawi for Malay regions). Jawi script is widely used in Riau and Riau Island province, where road signs and government building signs are written in this script. A sister variant called Pegon is used to write Javanese, Sundanese, and Madurese and is still widely used in traditional religious schools across Java, but has been supplanted in common writing by the Latin alphabet and, in some cases, Javanese script and Sundanese script.

== Letters ==
Jawi alphabet
Name	Isolated	Final	Medial	Initial	Sound represented	Rumi equivalent	Notes	Unicode
alif اليف	ا	ـا			/a/ or /ə/	a, e- pepet (ĕ)	Also represent the digit "1"	U+0627
ba باء	ب	ـب	ـبـ	بـ	/b/	b		U+0628
ta تاء	ت	ـت	ـتـ	تـ	/t/	t		U+062A
ta marbutah تاء مربوطة	ة	ـة			/t/ or /h/	-t, -h	Mainly used in Arabic loanwords	U+0629
sa (tha) ثاء	ث	ـث	ـثـ	ثـ	/s/ or /θ/	s	Mainly used in Arabic loanwords	U+062B
jim جيم	ج	ـج	ـجـ	جـ	/d͡ʒ/	j		U+062C
ca چا	چ	ـچ	ـچـ	چـ	/t͡ʃ/	c	Additional letter not present in Arabic Similar to Persian "چ" (Che)	U+0686
ha حاء	ح	ـح	ـحـ	حـ	/h/ or /ħ/	h	Also known as ha kecil (حاء کچيل) or ha pedas (حاء ڤدس); Mainly used in Arabic loanwords	U+062D
kha (khO) خاء	خ	ـخ	ـخـ	خـ	/x/	kh	Mainly used in Arabic loanwords	U+062E
dal دل	د	ـد			/d/	d		U+062F
zal ذال	ذ	ـذ			/z/ or /ð/	z	Mainly used in Arabic loanwords	U+0630
ra (rO) راء	ر	ـر			/r/	r		U+0631
zai زاي	ز	ـز			/z/	z	Mainly used in loanwords of European origin	U+0632
sin سين	س	ـس	ـسـ	سـ	/s/	s		U+0633
syin شين	ش	ـش	ـشـ	شـ	/ʃ/	sy, sh	Mainly used in loanwords of European origin	U+0634
sad (sOd) صاد	ص	ـص	ـصـ	صـ	/s/	s	Mainly used in Arabic loanwords	U+0635
dad (dOd) ضاد	ض	ـض	ـضـ	ضـ	/d/	d	Mainly used in Arabic loanwords	U+0636
ta (tO) طاء	ط	ـط	ـطـ	طـ	/ð/	t	Mainly used in Arabic loanwords	U+0637
za (zO) ظاء	ظ	ـظ	ـظـ	ظـ	/z/	z	Mainly used in Arabic loanwords	U+0638
ain عين	ع	ـع	ـعـ	عـ	/ʔ/	a, i, u, -k	Mainly used in Arabic loanwords	U+0639
ghain غين	غ	ـغ	ـغـ	غـ	/ɣ/	gh	Mainly used in Arabic loanwords	U+063A
nga ڠا	ڠ	ـڠ	ـڠـ	ڠـ	/ŋ/	ng	Additional letter not present in Arabic	U+06A0
fa فاء	ف	ـف	ـفـ	فـ	/f/	f	Mainly used in loanwords of European origin	U+0641
pa ڤا	ڤ	ـڤ	ـڤـ	ڤـ	/p/	p	Additional letter not present in Arabic Similar to Persian "پ" (Pe) in pronunciation	U+06A4
qaf قاف	ق	ـق	ـقـ	قـ	/q/ or /k/	q, k		U+0642
kaf کاف	ک	ـک	ـکـ	کـ	/k/	k		U+06A9
ga ݢا	ݢ	ـݢ	ـݢـ	ݢـ	/ɡ/	g	Additional letter not present in Arabic Similar to Persian "گ" (Gaf)	U+0762
lam لام	ل	ـل	ـلـ	لـ	/l/	l		U+0644
mim ميم	م	ـم	ـمـ	مـ	/m/	m		U+0645
nun نون	ن	ـن	ـنـ	نـ	/n/	n		U+0646
wau واو	و	ـو			/w/ and /u, o, ɔ/	w, u, o		U+0648
va ۏا	ۏ	ـۏ			/v/	v	Additional letter not present in Arabic; Mainly used in loanwords of European origin	U+06CF
ha هاء	ه	ـه	ـهـ	هـ	/h/	h	Also known as ha besar (هاء بسر) or ha simpul (هاء سيمڤول)	U+0647
hamzah همزة	ء	ء			/ʔ/	∅		U+0621
ya ياء	ي	ـي	ـيـ	يـ	/j/ and /i, e, ɛ/	y, i, e taling (é)		U+064A
ye يى	ى	ـى	ـىـ	ىـ	/ə, a/	-e pepet (ĕ), a	Also known as alif maqsurah (الف مقصورة); Mainly used in loanwords of European origin	U+0649
nya ڽا	ڽ	ـڽ	ـڽـ	ڽـ	/ɲ/	ny	Additional letter not present in Arabic	U+06BD

- Letters with no initial and middle forms adopt either isolated or final form, because they cannot be joined with suffixing letter. (ا, د, ذ, ر, ز, و, ۏ)
- The letter hamzah may also appear in its three-quarter form "ء" (hamzah tiga suku), above alif "أ", below alif "إ" or housed (above ya "ئ" or wau "ؤ").^{[e]}

=== Spelling ===
Modern Jawi spelling is based on the Daftar Kata Bahasa Melayu (DKBM): Rumi-Sebutan-Jawi dictionary. Older texts may use different spellings for some words. Nonetheless, even different modern sources may use different spelling conventions; they may differ especially in the usage of the matres lectionis (alif ا, wau و and ya ي) and the hamzah tiga suku ء, as well as in the spelling of vowels and consonant clusters in loanwords from English. One source tends to use the following conventions; there are numerous exceptions to them nonetheless.

- Loanwords may be spelled differently. Particularly, loanwords from Arabic often keep their original spellings.

The letters sa ث, ha ح, kha خ, zal ذ, sad ص, dad ض, ta ط, za ظ, ain ع, ghain غ, and ta marbutah ة are mostly used to spell Arabic loanwords, e.g., Selasa ثلاث, huruf حروف, khabar خبر, fasal فصل, darurat ضرورة, talak طلاق, zohor ظهر, saat ساعة, sunat سنة, khasiat خصية. The letter va ۏ is mostly used to spell English loanwords, e.g., universiti اونيۏرسيتي. The letters zai ز, syin ش, fa ف, and ye ى are mostly used to spell loanwords from English, Arabic or Dutch, e.g., zoo زو, zapin زاڤين, syif شيف, syukur شکور, filem فيلم, fakir فقير, nasionalisme ناسيوناليسمى, and takwa تقوى.

The letter x, used to spell loanwords from English, may be spelled using different Jawi letters, depending on pronunciation, e.g., disjointed kaf-sin ک‌س in sinaran X سينرن ايک‌س or zai ز in xenon زينون.

The letter syin ش is also used to represent ⟨sh⟩ especially for words derived from Classical Malay, e.g., مهاريشي maharishi; and loanwords, e.g., شيرڤا Sherpa.

Native Malay root morphemes with Rumi k in the syllable coda are glottal stops (pronounced [ʔ]) and are written with qaf ق, e.g., tengok تيڠوق, laksa لقسا, baiklah باءيقله, kotakku کوتقکو, kotakmu کوتقمو. Loanwords where the Rumi k is derived from Western languages are spelled with kaf: the initial and medial forms use the glyph ک, e.g., klinik کلينيک and teksi تيکسي; the final k form dominantly uses ک over ك, although the latter Arabic glyph is alternatively found often in some old writings and signages (e.g. variant spelling of klinik as کلينيك).

The letter fa ف was historically used to represent /p/ (Jawi: pa ڤ) and such usage may still be found in archaic literature. This is because /f/ is a non-native consonant in Malay found only in loanwords thus was often approximated as a /p/.

- Though there are exceptions,^{[a]} vowels and diphthongs tend to be spelled this way:

Rumi spelling
Rumi spelling	Jawi spelling							
Rumi spelling	First letter of a root morpheme		Middle of a root morpheme, in an open syllable		Middle of a root morpheme, in a closed syllable		Last letter of a root morpheme	
Rumi spelling	Jawi	Example	Jawi	Example	Jawi	Example	Jawi	Example
a	ا^{[b]}	abu ابو	ـا^{[b]}	cari چاري	ـا or omitted^{[b]}^{[c]}	sampan, wang سمڤن, واڠ	ـا or omitted^{[b]}^{[c]}	cuba, hanya چوبا, هاڽ
e "pepet" /ə/	ا^{[b]}	empat امڤت	(omitted)^{[b]}	bersih برسيه	(omitted)^{[b]}	sempit سمڤيت	ـى^{[d]}	nasionalisme ناسيوناليسمى
e "taling" /e/	ايـ^{[b]}	ekor ايکور	ـيـ^{[b]}	tengok تيڠوق	ـيـ^{[b]}	rendang ريندڠ	ـي^{[b]}	sate ساتي
i	ايـ^{[b]}	ibu ايبو	ـيـ^{[b]}	tiga تيݢ	ـيـ^{[b]}	hampir همڤير	ـي^{[b]}	kiri کيري
o	او^{[b]}	obor اوبور	ـو^{[b]}	bola بولا	ـو^{[b]}	esok ايسوق	ـو^{[b]}	soto سوتو
u	او^{[b]}	ubi اوبي	ـو^{[b]}	rugi روݢي	ـو^{[b]}	tun تون	ـو^{[b]}	biru بيرو
ai	اءيـ^{[e]}	aiskrim اءيسکريم	ـايـ	baiduri بايدوري	ـاءيـ^{[e]}	sait ساءيت	ـاي^{[f]}	ramai راماي
au	اءو^{[e]}	aur اءور	ـاو	sauna ساونا	ـاءو^{[e]}	taun تاءون	ـاو	pulau ڤولاو
oi	اويـ	oidium اويديوم	ـويـ	boikot بويکوت	ـوءيـ^{[e]}	eksploit ايکسڤلوءيت	ـوي	sepoi ~ sepui سڤوي

- ^a When spelling vowels, there are many exceptions to the conventions stated above and below. Common exceptions include ada اد, di د, dia دي, dan دان, ia اي, jika جک, juga جوݢ, lima ليم, ke ک, kita کيت, mereka مريک, ini اين, itu ايت, pada ڤد, suka سوک, and tiga تيݢ.
- ^b Some words spelled distinctly in Rumi may be homographs in Jawi, e.g., sembilan and sambilan are both سمبيلن, markah and merekah are both مرکه, sesi and sisi are both سيسي, biro and biru are both بيرو, borong and burung are both بوروڠ, and golong and gulung are both ݢولوڠ.
- ^c Using or omitting alif ا when representing /a/ in closed syllables and in the last letter of a root morpheme:

When representing /a/, alif ا is mostly omitted in CVC-syllables.

However, it is usually not omitted in monosyllabic words that start with wau و, e.g., wau واو, wap واڤ, wang واڠ.

It is also usually not omitted in root morphemes which first syllable is open and contains /e/ and which second syllable is closed and begins with /wa/, e.g., words with a /Ce.waC/ structure (where each C is a consonant) like lewah ليواه, mewah ميواه, dewan ديوان, tewas تيواس, rewang ريواڠ, gewang ݢواڠ, sewat سيوات, kelewang کليواڠ, kedewas کديواس, dewangga ديواڠݢ.

Final alif ا is generally kept to represent /a/ [ə] at the end of a word.

However, in native and Sanskrit-derived Malay disyllabic root morphemes with the form /Ca.C*a/ [Ca.C*ə], where /C*/ is any of the following 12 consonants ba ب, ta ت, pa ڤ, sin س, ga ݢ, nun ن, nya ڽ, ca چ, kaf ک, jim ج, mim م, ya ی (mnemonic: betapa segannya cik jam بتاڤ سݢنڽ چيق جم), final alif ا is not written, e.g., raba راب, mata مات, sapa ساڤ, rasa راس (from Skt. रस rasa), raga راݢ, mana مان, hanya هاڽ, baca باچ (from Skt. वाचा vācā), raya راي, baka باک, raja راج (from Skt. राजन् rājan), nama نام (from Skt. नाम nāma), and sama سام.

Some native and Sanskrit-derived Malay trisyllabic root morphemes ending with /a/ [ə], with three open syllables and which include the abovementioned 12 consonants, may also omit the final alif ا e.g. neraka نراک (from Skt. नरक naraka).

- ^d Root morpheme-final alif maqsura ى becomes alif ا instead when in the middle of a word, e.g., fatwa فتوى → memfatwakan ممفتواکن, metabolisme ميتابوليسمى → memetabolismekan ممتابوليسماکن.
- ^e The hamzah may be used to spell some diphthongs. Sources differ as to whether and when it should be on the line ء, or placed above the previous mater lectionis, such as in alif with hamzah above أ, or even if it should be used at all in some words.

Furthermore, it may be used to represent a hiatus, or a glottal stop [ʔ], especially when (but not limited to) separating vowels at the boundary of a root morpheme and an affix, e.g., dato' داتوء, baik باءيق, mulai مولاءي, bau باءو, daun داءون, laut لاءوت, peperiksaan ڤڤريقساءن, kemerdekaan کمرديکاءن, diambil دإيلقکن, dielakkan دإيلقکن, diertikan دأرتيکن, diikuti دإيکوتي, diolah دأوله, diutamakan دأوتاماکن, keadaan کأداءن, keempat کأمڤت, keindahan کأيندهن, keupayaan کأوڤاياءن, seakan-akan سأکن-اکن, seekor سأيکور, seorang سأورڠ, e-mel اي-ميل, eh! ايه!, ateisme اتيئيسمى, diet ديئت.

- ^f There are some exceptions in fixed spellings, such as Brunei بروني, where final ي is used instead.

== Numerals ==
Modern Jawi texts tend to use Western Arabic numerals, but historically Western and Eastern Arabic numerals are both used. Eastern Arabic numerals used in historical Jawi documents have several graphical difference from standard modern glyphs. The digit 4 uses "Persian" form ۴ instead of ٤. Digit 5 varies between rounded ٥ and notched forms ۵.

Western Arabic numerals	0	1	2	3	4	5	6	7	8	9
Eastern Arabic numerals	٠	١	٢	٣	٤/۴	٥/۵	٦	٧	٨	٩

== Punctuation ==
Full reduplication of a base word is represented with the numeral ٢, e.g., anak-anak انق٢, while the suffixed reduplication of a base word is represented with the hyphen "-", e.g., berhati-hati برهاتي-هاتي, sayur-sayuran سايور-سايورن, and gunung-ganang ݢونوڠ-ݢانڠ.

Other punctuation marks used in written Jawi are as follows:

Punctuation mark	Malay name		Rumi	Jawi
Punctuation mark	Rumi	Jawi	Rumi	Jawi
Comma	Tanda koma	تندا کوما	,	⹁
Semicolon	Tanda koma bertitik	تندا کوما برتيتيق	;	⁏
Question mark	Tanda soal	تندا سوءال	?	؟

== Examples ==
Akin to the Arabic script, Jawi is constructed from right-to-left. Below is an exemplification of the Jawi script extracted from the first and second verse of the notable Ghazal untuk Rabiah, غزال اونتوق ربيعة (English: A Ghazal for Rabiah).

Jawi script

کيلاوان اينتن برکليڤ-کليڤ دلاڠيت تيڠݢي⹁
دان چهاي مناري-ناري دلاڠيت بيرو⹁
تيدقله داڤت مننڠکن ڤراساءنکو⹁
يڠ ريندوکن کحاضيرن کاسيه.

ݢمرسيق ايراما مردو بولوه ڤريندو⹁
دان ڽاڽين ڤري٢ دري کايڠن⹁
تيدقله داڤت تنترمکن صنوبري⹁
يڠ مندمباکن کڤستين کاسيهمو.

Rumi script

Kilauan intan berkelip-kelip di langit tinggi,
Dan cahaya menari-nari di langit biru,
Tidaklah dapat menenangkan perasaanku,
Yang rindukan kehadiran kasih.

Gemersik irama merdu buluh perindu,
Dan nyanyian peri-peri dari kayangan,
Tidaklah dapat tenteramkan sanubari,
Yang mendambakan kepastian kasihmu.

English translation

The glimmer of gems twinkling in the lofty sky,
And light that dances across upon the azure sky,
Are not able to soothe my heart,
That pines for the presence of the Beloved.

The melodious rhythm of the reed flute,
And the chorus of nymphs from Heaven,
Are not able to calm the soul,
That craves the certainty of your Love.
