= Jawi keyboard =

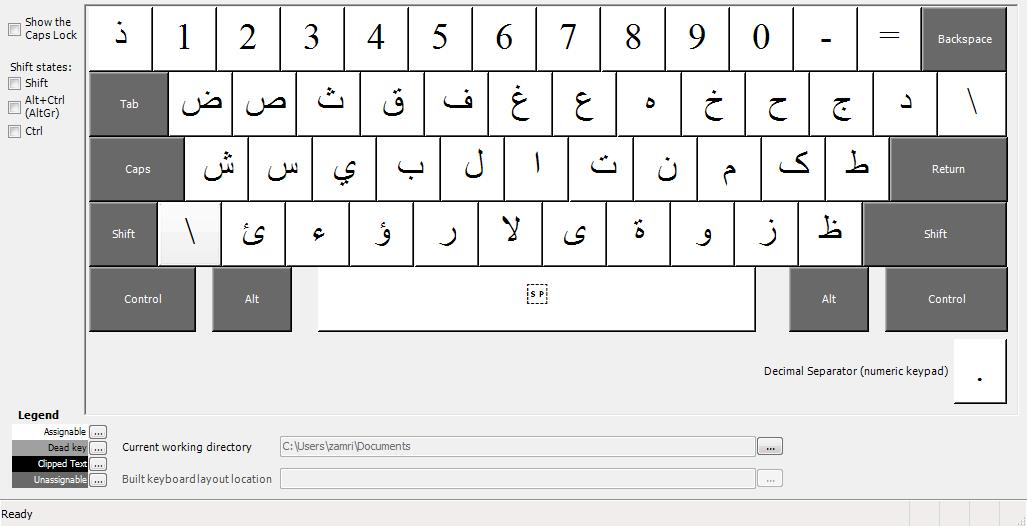
Normal Position

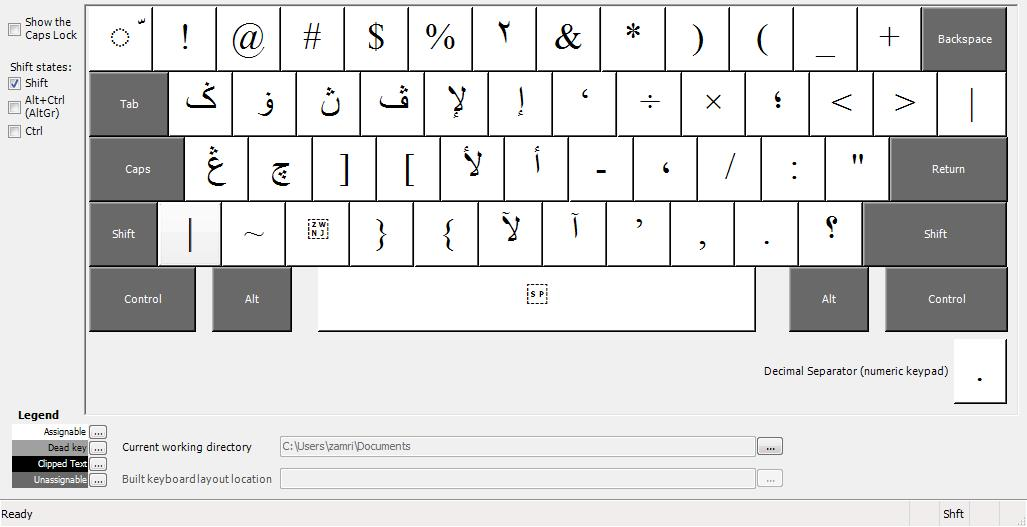
Shift Position

The Jawi keyboard layout is a keyboard layout for writing the Jawi script on the Windows platform. It is based on a standard set by SIRIM (Standard Malaysia) in 2011. The layout was devised by Technical Committee in Multi-Lingual Computing at SIRIM. It was approved in 2011.

The design is based on 3 principles;

- the layout is based on existing Arabic keyboard layout since many Jawi characters are based on Arabic characters
- Make minimal changes to the existing layout
- Add feature to support Jawi

As a result, the Technical Committee agree on two designs, Normal Position and Shift Position.

Apart from the SIRIM approved Jawi Keyboard for Windows, a phonetic Jawi keyboard layout that is based from macOS Jawi (QWERTY) that was written for Windows is also available. This version of the keyboard layout is different as it allows typing without the need of an Arabic Keyboard for a more natural typing on a normal QWERTY Keyboard.
