= Kamus Dewan =

Malay language dictionary

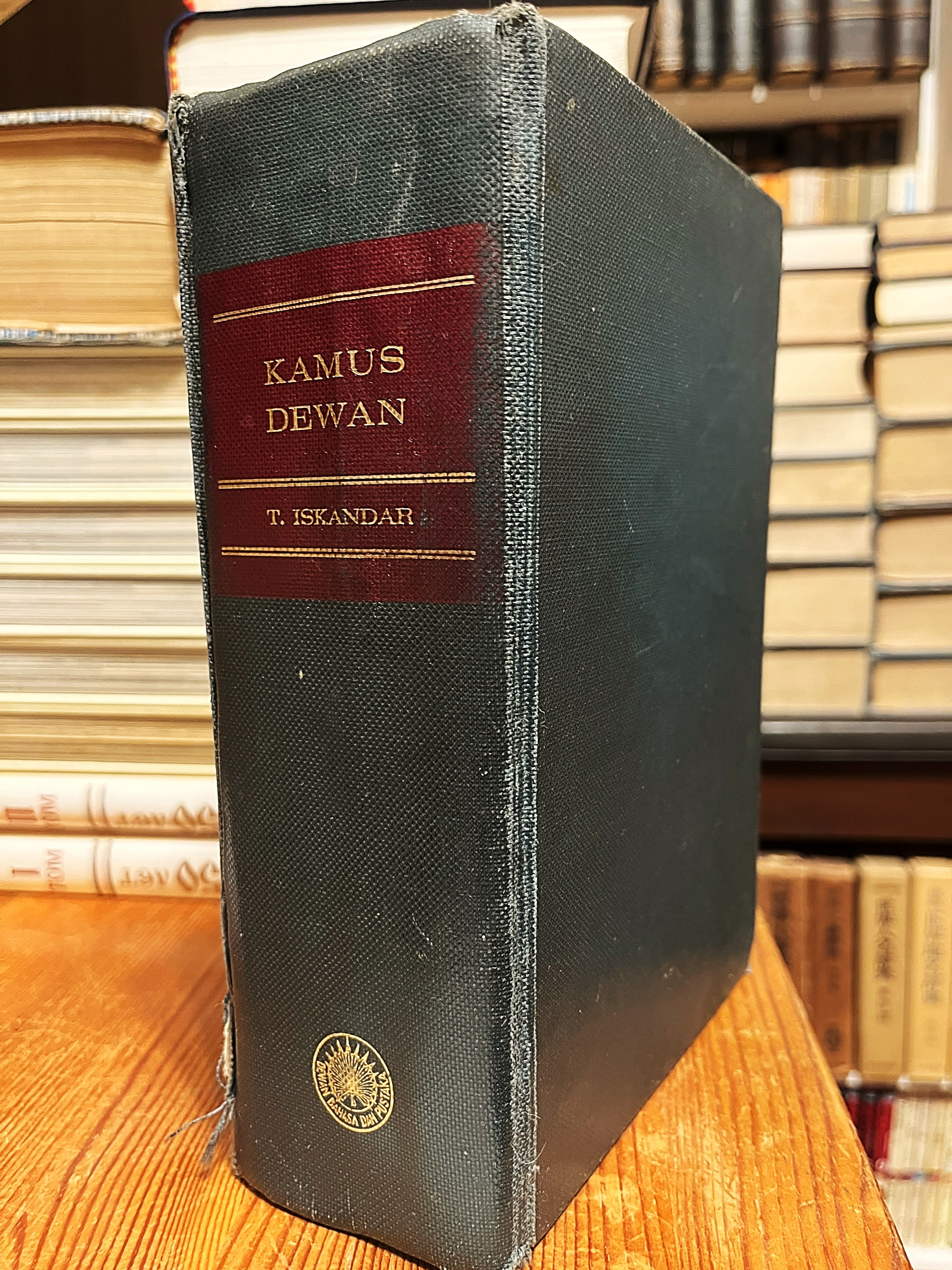
The back of the Kamus Dewan dictionary

Kamus Dewan (Malay for The Institute Dictionary) is a Malay-language dictionary compiled by Teuku Iskandar and published by Dewan Bahasa dan Pustaka. This dictionary is useful to students who are studying Malay literature as they provide suitable synonyms, abbreviations and meanings of many Malay words.

The dictionary is approved for use in the General Certificate of Education 'N', 'O' and 'A'-Levels Malay-language examinations organised in Singapore.

== Editions ==
As of 2005, four editions of the dictionary have been published. The first edition was published in 1970, the second edition in 1984, the third edition in 1994 and 1998 and the fourth edition in 2005. Out of the four editions, the most popular one is the third edition, which has more than 36,000 entries and around 1,566 pages. The fourth edition – the newest edition – has over 49,000 entries and 1,817 pages.

== Other versions of Kamus Dewan ==
Kamus Dewan is also published in a digital version. The Dewan Eja Pro software which uses Kamus Dewan is commercialised by The Name Technology Sdn. Bhd.

There is also an online version of the dictionary created by KaryaNet or Pusat Rujukan Persuratan Melayu.
